= 438 Tactical Helicopter Squadron =

Unit of the Royal Canadian Air Force

- Active: 1934–present
- Country: Canada
- Branch: (Canada) Royal Canadian Air Force
- Role: Tactical helicopter
- Part of: 1 Wing
- Home station: CFB St. Hubert
- Nickname: Wildcats
- Motto: Going down
- Anniversaries: September 1, 1934
- Battle honours: Fortress Europe 1944; France and Germany 1944–1945; Normandy 1944; Arnhem; Rhine
- Website: www.canada.ca/en/air-force/corporate/squadrons/438-squadron.html

Insignia
- Squadron Badge: The head of a wildcat affronte

Aircraft flown
- Helicopter: Bell CH-146 Griffon

438 "City of Montreal" Tactical Helicopter Squadron (French: 438^{e} Escadron tactique d'hélicoptères "Ville de Montréal") is a unit of the Royal Canadian Air Force. The squadron operates the Bell CH-146 Griffon tactical helicopter from the Hartland de Montarville Molson Hangar of CFB St. Hubert in Quebec, Canada. Its tasks include armed and unarmed tactical utility transport, training aircrew personnel in basic and advanced aviation tactics, technical training of groundcrew personnel and flight engineers and the periodic maintenance of CH-146 fleet aircraft. They also include as residual capabilities search and rescue, reconnaissance and support to federal, provincial and local law enforcement agencies. A "total force" unit composed of members of the Regular Force, and both full time and part time reservists, the squadron is part of 1 Wing at CFB Kingston Ontario.

The motto "Going Down" was adopted during the Second World War when operating Hawker Typhoon fighter bombers over occupied Europe. This was the flight leader's instruction to begin diving attacks with bombs, cannons or both.

The unit badge is the wildcat and described in heraldic terms as: "d'Argent, the head of a wildcat affront Gules, langued Azure". The wildcat was chosen as the emblem as it represents the squadron's nickname.

== Pre-war ==
=== Formation ===
The formation of the Squadron is due to the sustained efforts of Adélard Raymond, Montreal businessman and veteran pilot of the First World War, and La Presse journalist Lionel Saint-Jean who was the president of the Quebec Aviation League. These men worked closely together from May 1934 onwards to formulate a formal request aimed at the formation of a reserve aviation squadron attached to the militia, like the already existing ones in Toronto, Winnipeg, and Vancouver, but composed of francophones. This official request was presented on 18 June 1934 in the form of a letter to Brigadier-General W.W.P. Gibsone, commander of Military District 4 and included the signatures of several local businessmen and politicians. It contained (translated from the original text in French):

“We are particularly proud to declare that the group we represent is French Canadian. We, French-speaking Canadians, want to affirm once again our patriotism towards our country. We want this squadron to be made up of French Canadians ...”

On 27 July, Group Captain G.M. Croil, senior officer of the RCAF, met with Mr. St-Jean and a dozen other signatories. From a list of 31 qualified pilots, including several veterans of 1914–18, he selected 14 who would form the initial nucleus of the new unit. It was on 1 September 1934 that the unit was authorized in Montreal, Quebec as No. 18 Bomber Squadron (Auxiliary). It will initially have an authorized strength of 66 members and will be under the temporary administrative command of Squadron Leader C.E. Trudeau, a regular member personally recommended by Brigadier-General Gibsone.

=== First flights ===
Following the recruitment and training of the cadre personnel forming the basic structure of the Squadron, flight training operations began in May 1936 from St-Hubert on the south shore of Montreal following the reception of the first two of four de Havilland DH.60 Moths. Squadron leader Marcel Dubuc, a veteran pilot with recognized qualities, was appointed its first commanding officer in May 1936. The unit was renumbered No. 118 (Bomber) Squadron on November 17, 1937 as part of a restructuring of RCAF squadrons. Two additional aircraft arrived in 1938 and the size of the squadron was increased to 114 members.

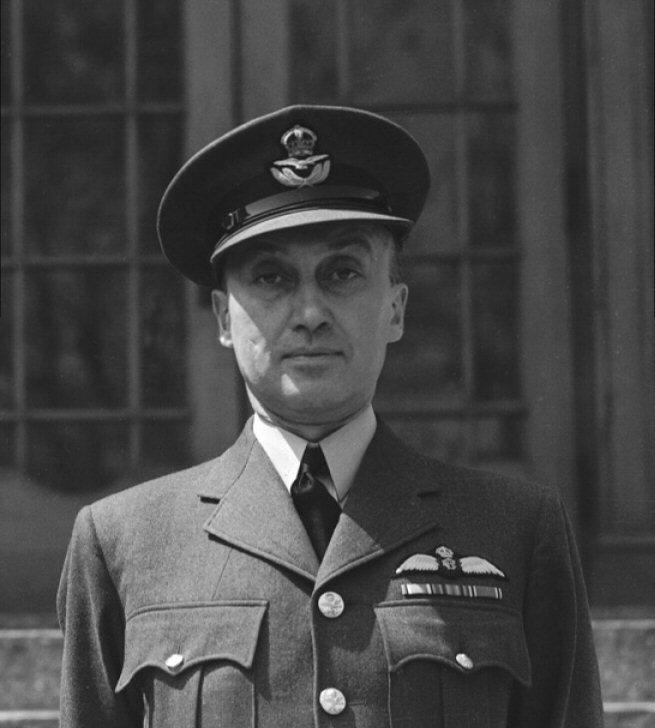
Squadron leader Marcel Dubuc 1st CO of 118 (B) Squadron - 1936

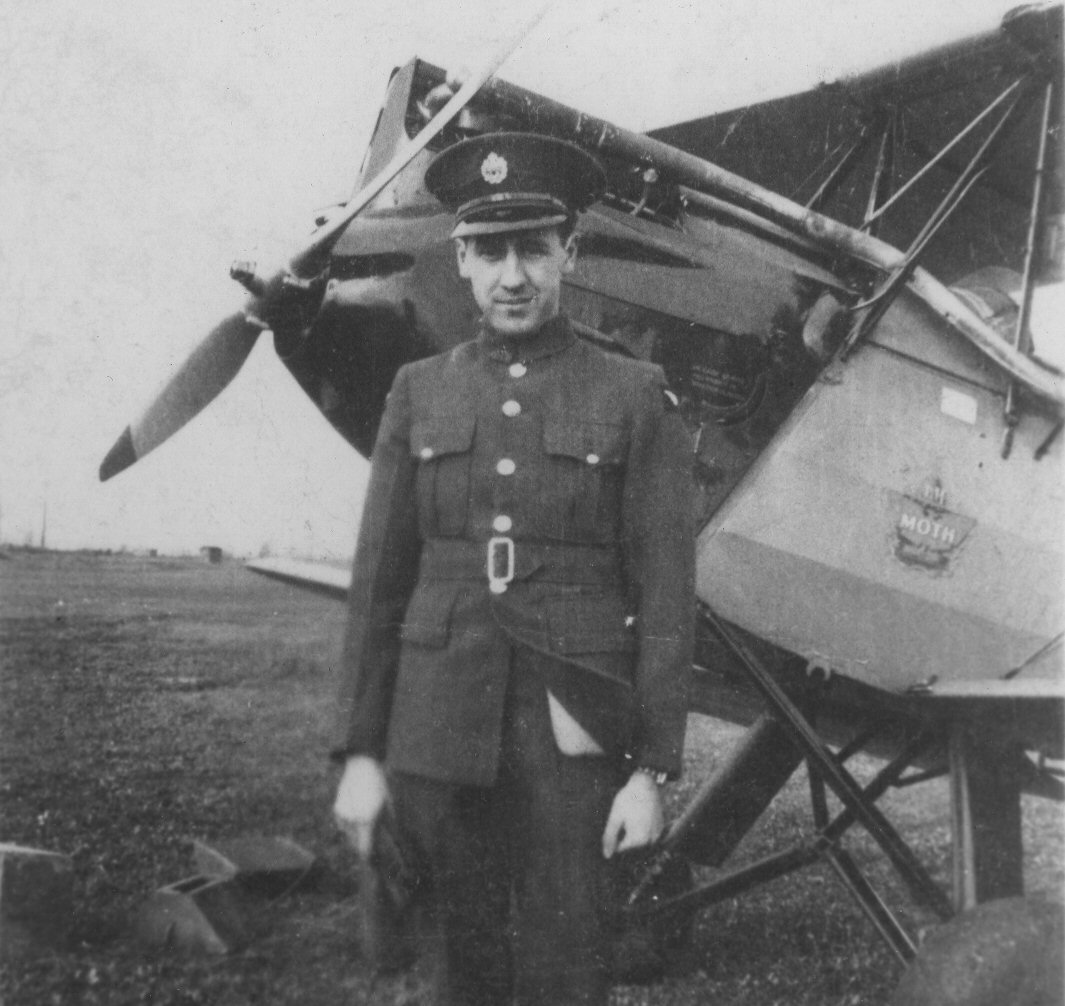
Airman Léo Blanchette 118 (B) Squadron recruit - 1937

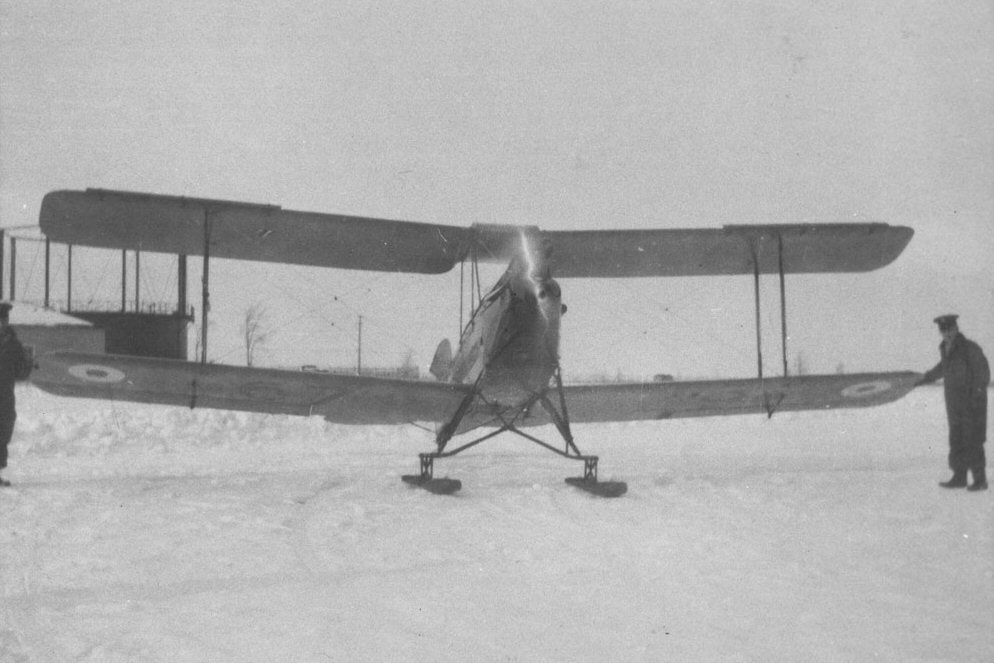
Gipsy Moth no. 67 on skis for winter ops 118 (B) Squadron - 1937

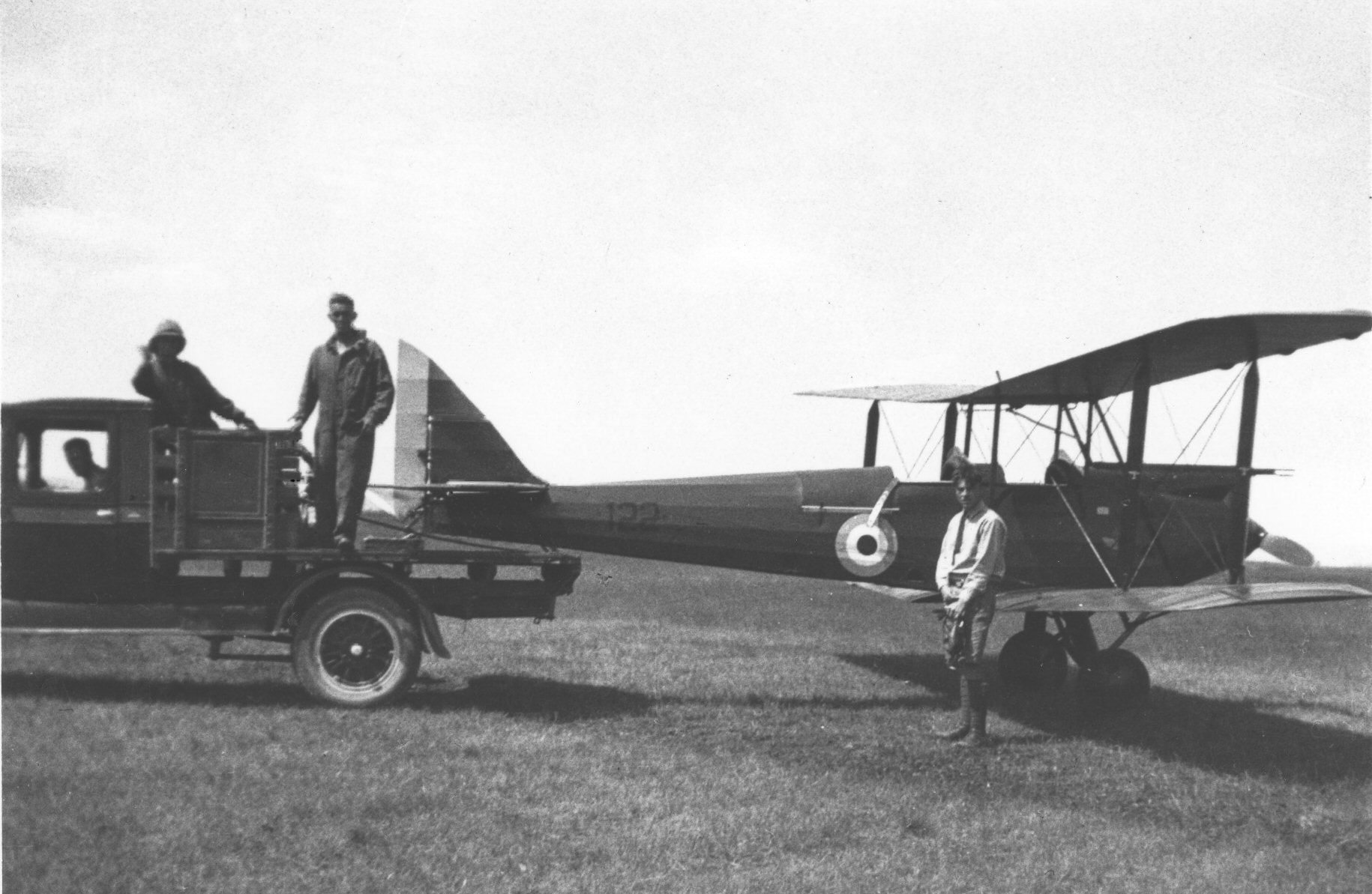
Gipsy Moth no. 122 being towed 118 (B) Squadron - 1938

== Second World War ==
=== Coastal Artillery Co-operation ===
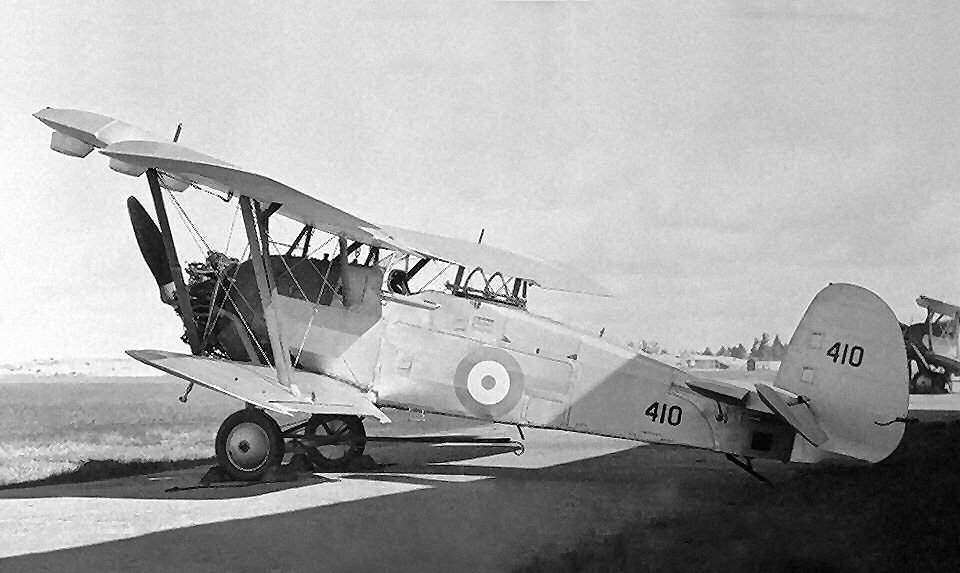
118 Sqn Armstrong Whitworth Atlas #410

The unit was redesignated No.118 (Coast Artillery Co-operation) Squadron on 1 September 1939, activated for voluntary wartime service on 3 September, and moved to Saint John, New Brunswick on 28 October. 117 (Aux) Sqn from St-John N.B. was simultaneously absorbed into the unit along with personnel transferred in from No. 2 (AC) Sqn with their Atlas aircraft. These reinforcements formed a new A flight that would operate out of Halifax airport until 31 March 1940 when they moved to RCAF Station Dartmouth.

The squadron was reequipped with Westland Lysanders and Blackburn Sharks better suited to this new role which consisted of patrolling the coast for enemy naval activity and directing coastal artillery batteries when/if required. Westland Wapiti aircraft borrowed from No.10 (B) Sqn were also used for a few months until more Atlases became available.

After nearly a year of coastal sweeps, the occasional patrol for convoys close inshore, dive-bombing exercises with army batteries and naval anti-aircraft gunners, air gunnery training and aerial photographic duties, the squadron was temporarily deactivated on 27 September 1940 pending redesignation and the arrival of more modern aircraft.

=== Atlantic Coast defence ===
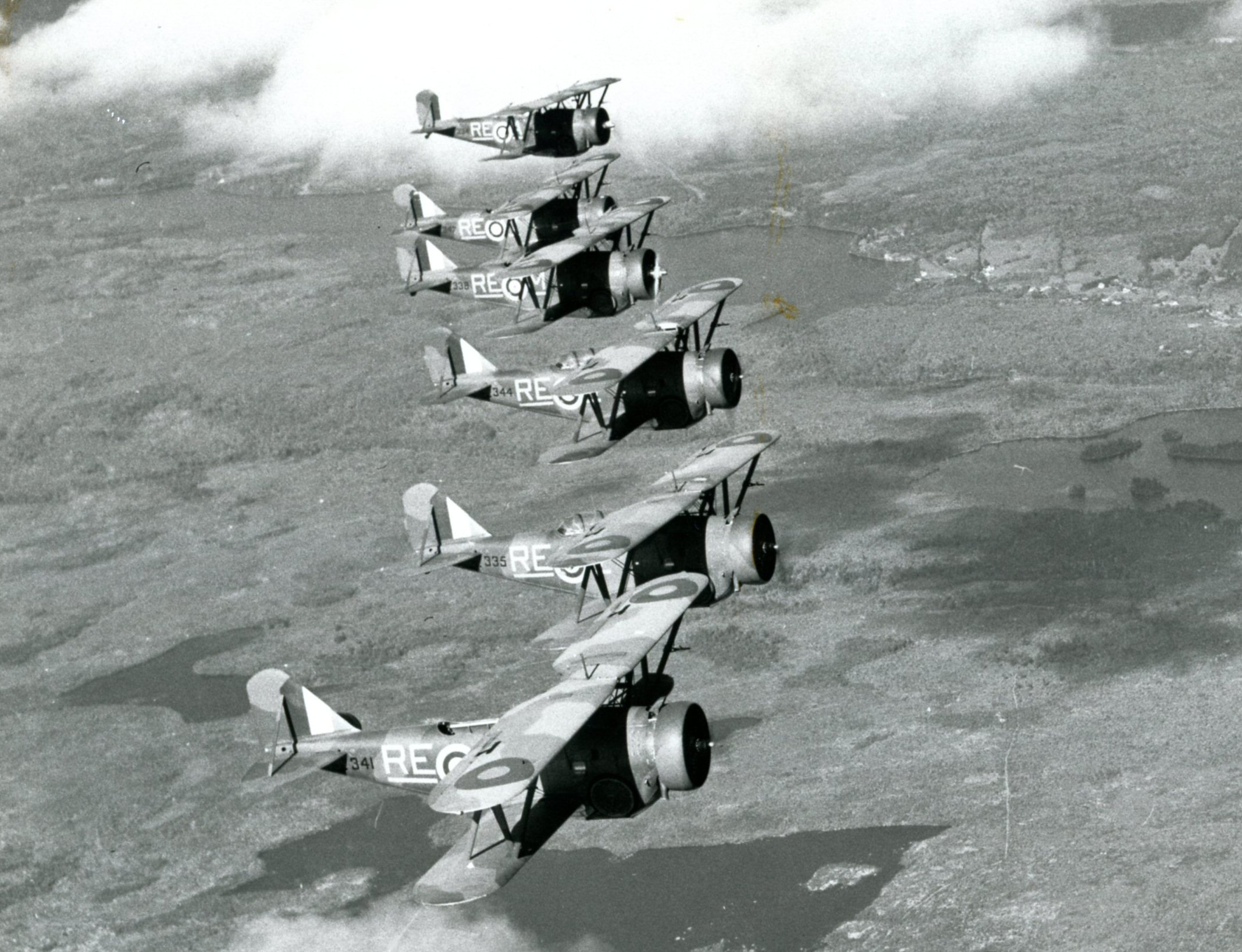
118 Sqn Goblins near Dartmouth

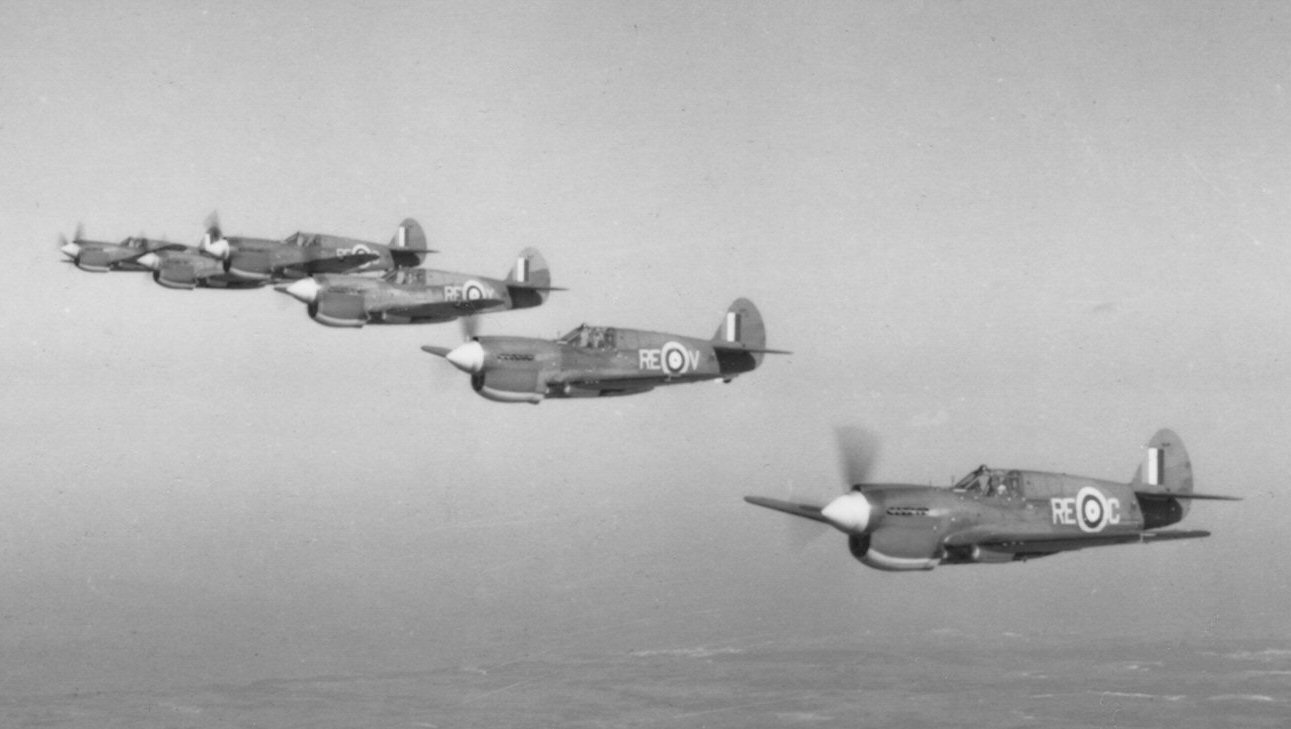
118 Sqn Kittyhawks near Dartmouth

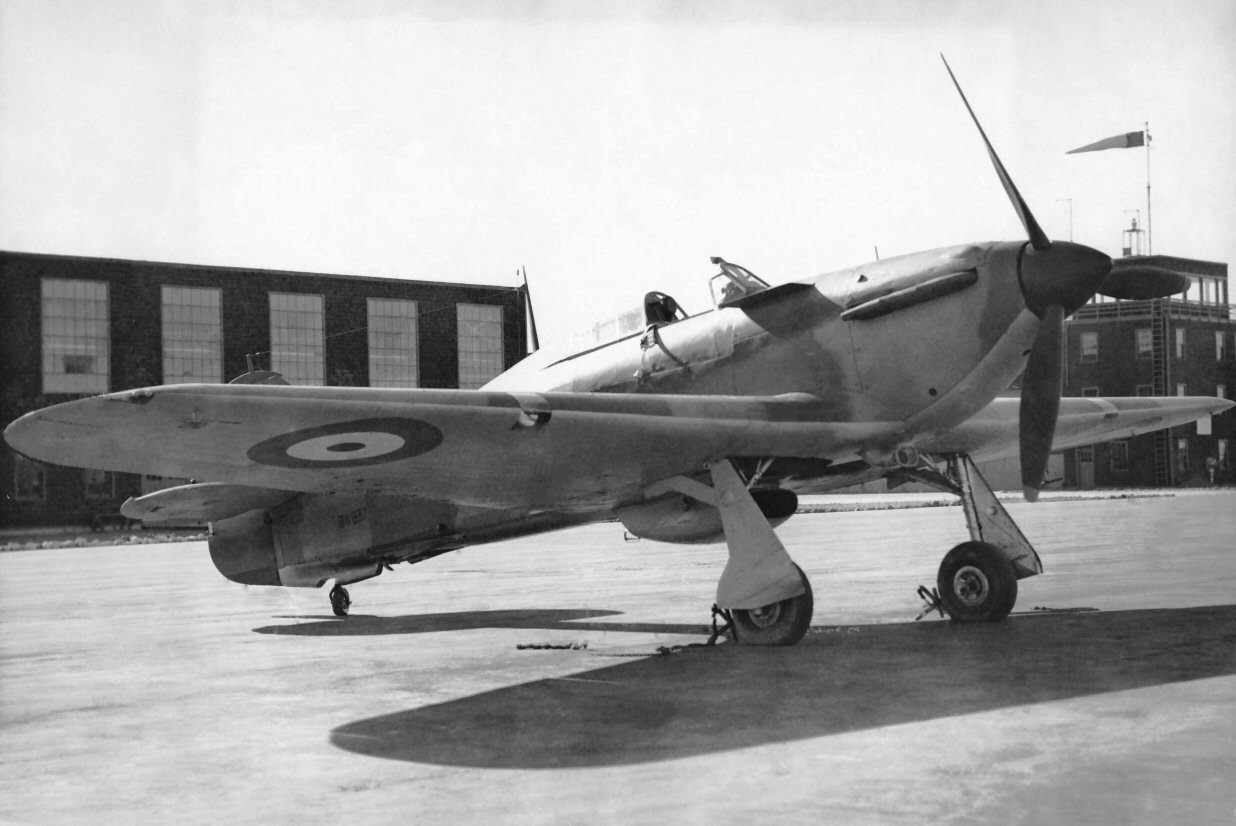
118 Sqn Hawker Sea Hurricane #BW837

The squadron was reactivated at Rockliffe, Ontario on 13 January 1941 with the new designation No.118 (Fighter) Squadron and reequipped with the Grumman Goblin, an American biplane design which were licence built in Canada by Canadian Car and Foundry . The unit moved to Dartmouth, Nova Scotia in July being at that time, the sole fighter squadron available for East Coast defence. In October 1941 the more capable Curtiss Kittyhawk replaced the obsolete Goblin.

The RCAF was facing a serious shortage of frontline fighters, having sent its Hawker Hurricanes off to the UK with No. 1 (F) Squadron, it was having a hard time procuring additional fighters to meet its needs. For these reasons, 50 Canadian built Sea Hurricanes destined for the British Royal Navy were retained in Canada. All were placed on strength of 118 Sqn in November 1941.

These brand new fighters were test flown by 118 squadron pilots upon arrival or reassembly. Many were put in temporary storage, the few others still leaving with the RAF were also test flown by 118 pilots prior to fitting to catapult equipped merchant vessels. 118 Sqn formed a “Hurricane Flight” and more than a dozen were regularly flown by squadron personnel. 118 was operating a full complement of Kittyhawks, Sea Hurricanes, and a few Harvards, and was still flying its Goblins well into January 1942. These catapult spool and arrestor hook equipped Sea Hurricanes were painted in the British Fleet Air Arm paint scheme of dark greys with 'Royal Navy' painted on the fuselage, looking oddly out of place on an RCAF ramp. On 27 April 1942, the Sea Hurricanes, many of which with their naval modifications now removed, along with many 118 Sqn personnel from the “Hurricane Flight” formed the nucleus of the newly formed 126 (F) Sqn also at Dartmouth. This new unit would be temporarily under the command of Flight Lieutenant Arthur Yuile who had previously been in charge of the flight. On January 16, 1942, when two 118 Squadron Kittyhawks spotted and attacked a surfaced German U-boat approximately 10 miles off the coast near the Sambro Island light house. Flying Officer W.P. Roberts in Kittyhawk AK851 was able to fire six bursts and obtain a number of hits around the conning tower before the submarine dove underwater and disappeared from sight.

The squadron code displayed on all unit aircraft was "RE" from January 1941 to May 1942 when it changed to "VW".

=== Fighter - Pacific Coast ===
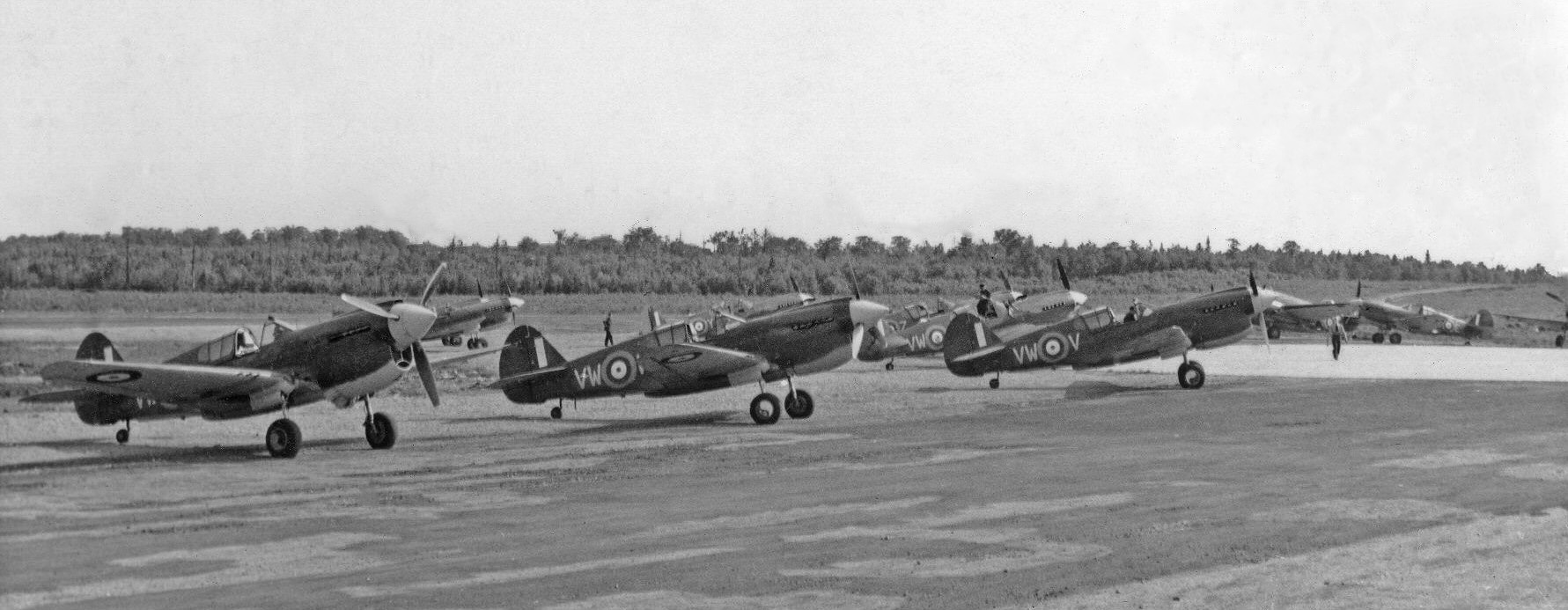
Kittyhawks of 118 Sqn on the Pacific coast in 1943

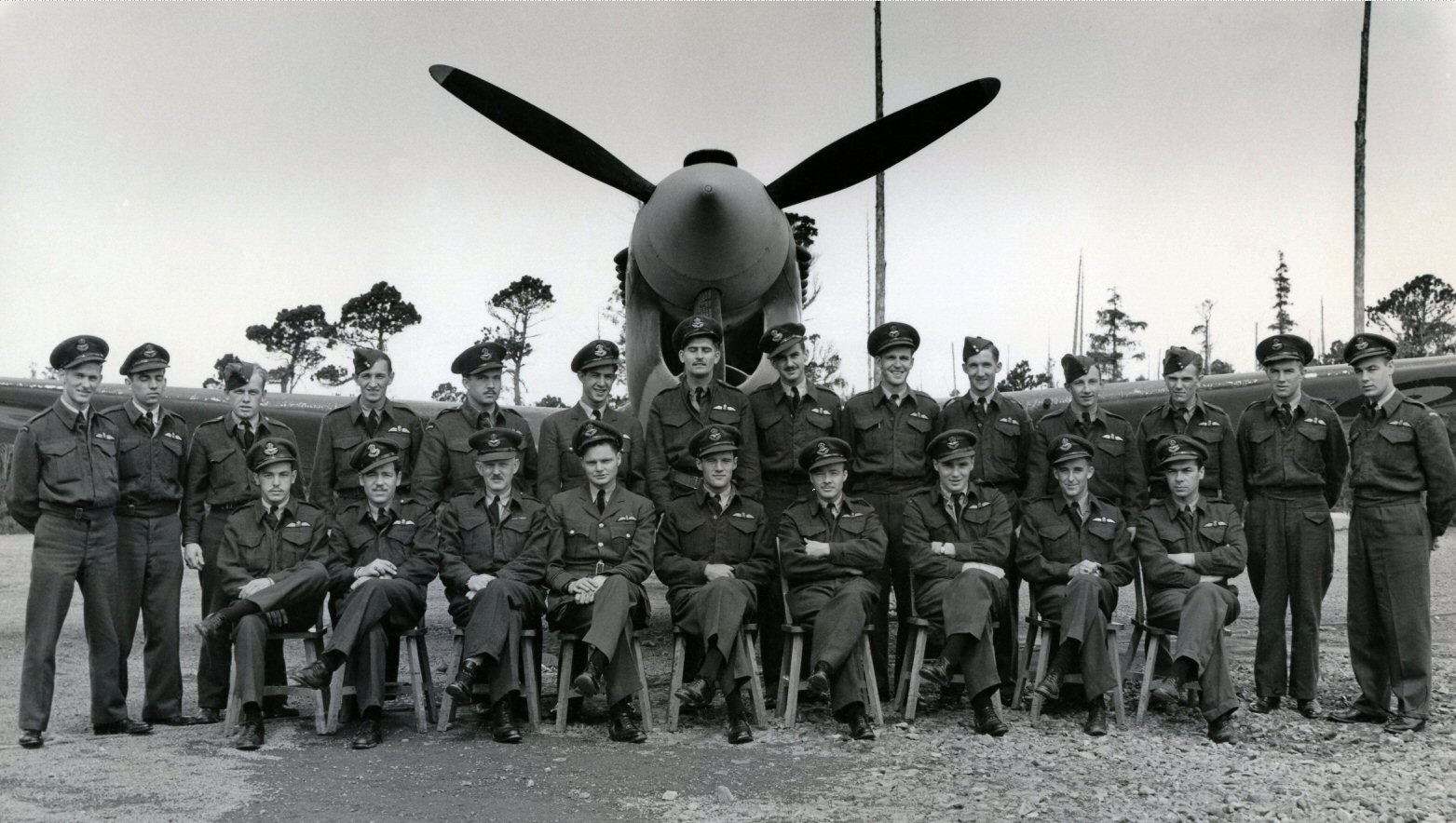
118 squadron pilots in front of a Kittyhawk, Sea Island B.C. 1943

With the entry of the United States into the war following the Japanese attack on Pearl Harbor, the Canadian Government of Prime Minister Mackenzie King offered military naval and air support to the then limited American capabilities facing Japanese expansion in the Aleutian Islands. Two fighter and light bomber wings were formed for service on the Pacific coast, X and Y Wings composed of Kittyhawk fighters and Bristol Bolingbroke light bombers under the RCAF Western Air Command. 118 Sqn and 115 Squadron formed Y Wing.

For the historic cross-continent flight of 4,000 miles, 118 was led by Flight Lieutenant Yuile. Squadron Leader Hartland Molson, 118 Squadron's commanding officer and a veteran Hurricane pilot of the Battle of Britain, remained in Dartmouth to assume command of 126 (F) Sqn.

The squadron left Dartmouth on the morning of 6 June 1942 for Annette Island, Alaska. The squadron made refuelling stops at Penfield Ridge, New Brunswick, Saint-Hubert, Quebec, North Bay, Ontario, Porquis Junction, Ontario, Winnipeg, Manitoba, Saskatoon, Saskatchewan, Edmonton, Alberta, and Prince George, British Columbia. They arrived on 21 June; A Flight was armed and refuelled ready for action within 15 minutes of landing. The squadron moved to Sea Island British Columbia on 20 August 1943 and would remain there until ordered overseas.

Five pilots died in non-combat-related crashes during this period of home defence.

=== Fighter bombers in Europe ===
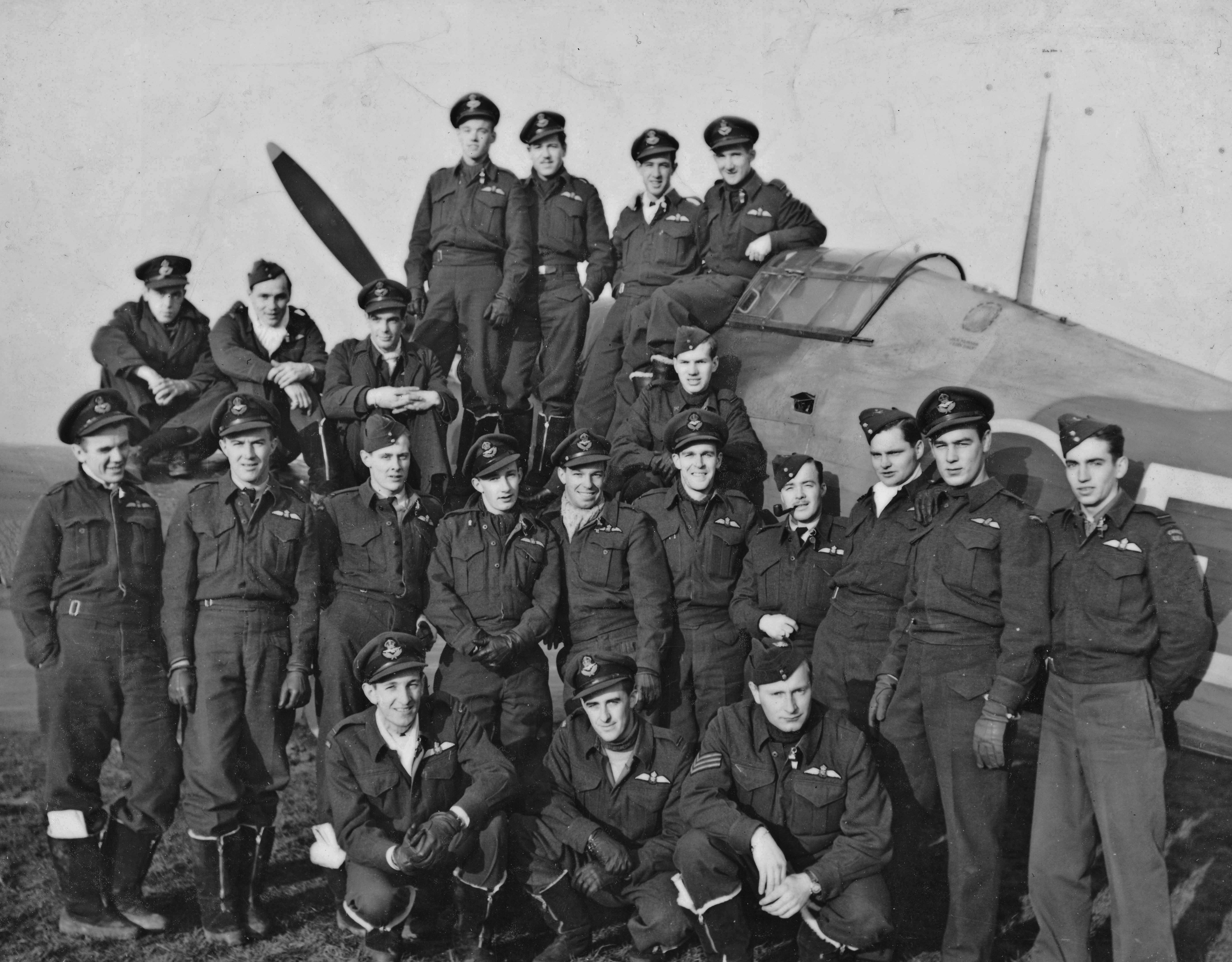
Pilots of 438 Sqn with a Hurricane at Ayr, January 1944

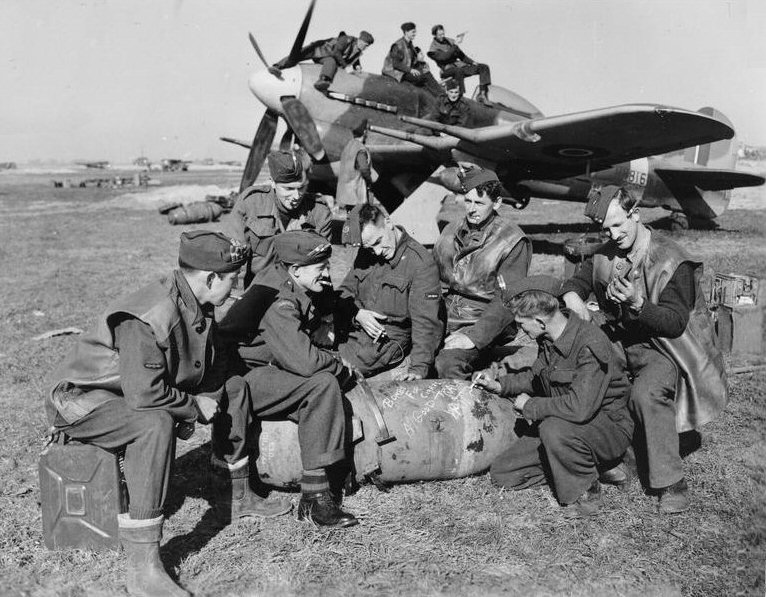
Groundcrews of 438 Sqn with a unit Typhoon, Eindhoven Netherlands 1945

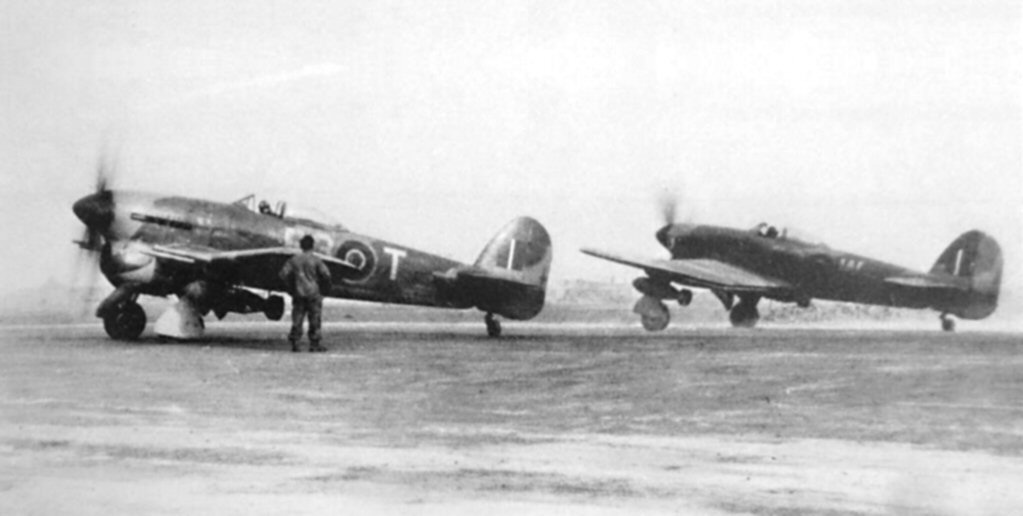
438 Squadron "Bombphoons" taxiing at B.78 Eindhoven, 1945

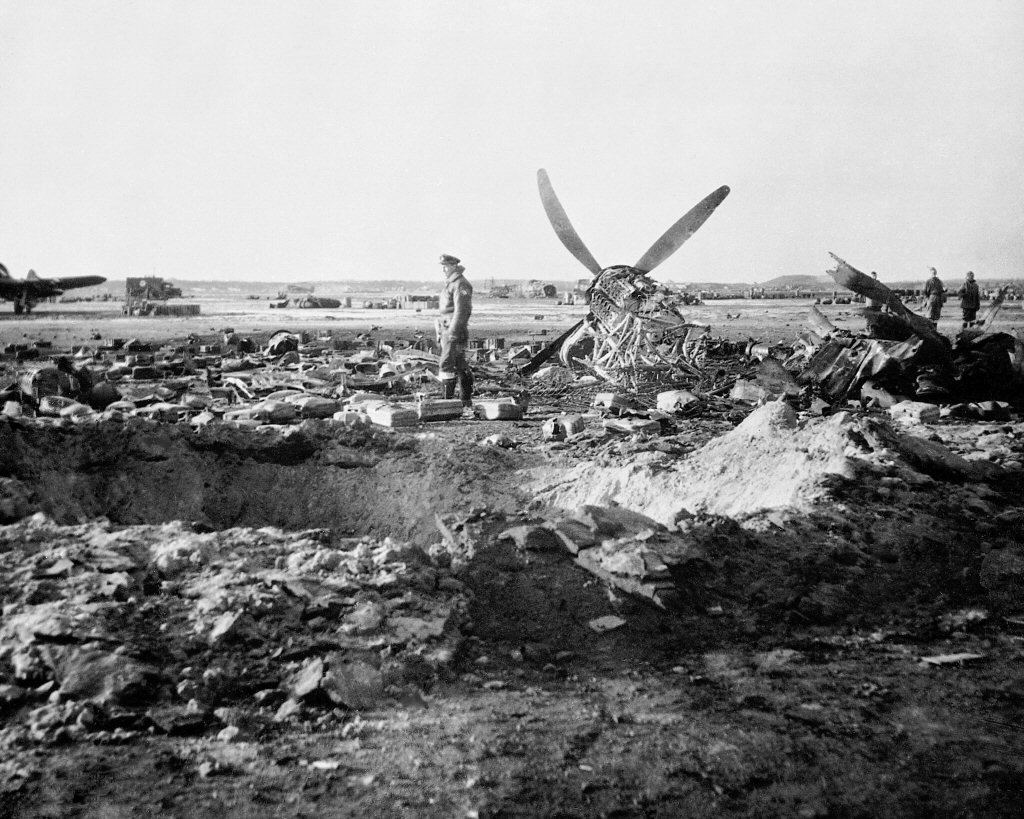
Destroyed RCAF Typhoons after the German attack on Eindhoven airfield on 1 January 1945

Leaving their Kittyhawks behind, the 142 strong squadron crossed Canada by rail, embarking on 2 November 1943 in Halifax for the sea voyage to the United Kingdom. The squadron was once again redesignated, this time as No.438 (Fighter Bomber) Squadron upon arriving at Royal Air Force Station Digby, Lincolnshire on 18 November. RCAF squadrons were renumbered between 400 and 449 to avoid confusion with other British Empire units also operating from the United Kingdom. under RAF operational control. Its new squadron code was "F3" which was retained until the end of hostilities in Europe. The squadron moved to RAF Ayr II (Healthfield) in Scotland on 10 January 1944 where the pilots learnt to fly the Hawker Hurricane first to ease conversion to the powerful Hawker Typhoon. 438 Squadron was now one of three RCAF Typhoon squadrons forming No. 143 Wing RCAF within the RAF Second Tactical Air Force (2TAF).

In mid March, 438 squadron began cross-channel offensive operations against pre-invasion targets flying from RAF Hurn and RAF Funtington. After D-Day, its main task was close support to allied ground forces by dive-bombing and strafing enemy strong-points, bridges, rail and road traffic. The front lines moving further inland, on 27 June the squadron moved to forward airfield B-9 at Lantheuil in France. This base was still well within the range of German artillery and on 15 July Flying Officer Ross Johnson, a 21 year old pilot was killed during a barrage directed at his motor transport. The Wildcats moved from airfield to airfield following the advance of the front lines deeper into Europe. They were at B.24 St André on 31 August, B.48 Glisy on 3 September, and at B.58 Melsbroek on 6 September to participate in support of Operation Market Garden. It moved into the airfield at Eindhoven, Netherlands on 26 September; the base had just been recently vacated by the enemy as a result of the operation. There they lost their new commanding officer Acting Squadron Leader Peter Wilson on the very day he took command, 1 January 1945, during the Luftwaffe's Operation Bodenplatte attacks on allied airfields.

On 19 March 1945, after nearly 6 months in Eindhoven, with the end of the war in sight, the squadron was pulled from combat operations and sent back to RAF Warmwell for rocket firing training, ironic considering the RCAF Typhoon squadrons did not use this weapon in combat preferring bombs earning them the nickname "Bombphoons". It is during this Armament Practice Camp that their latest CO, Squadron Leader James Easson Hogg DFC, a seasoned veteran, failed to pull out of a dive and crashed into the channel dying instantly. The squadron returned to the fight on 3 April in Germany proper this time to B.100 Goch, to B.150 Hustedt on 21 April and finally to B.166 Flensburg on 29 May, the squadron was disbanded there on 26 August.

A typical squadron action in 1944: "September 10 produced four missions. At 1520 hours S/L Beirnes led nine Typhoons to the area of Turnhout-Venlo-Eindhoven to strafe four trains, each with 10-20 cars. In each case the locomotive was destroyed. The flight landed at 1630 and was off again at 1930, this time with 500-pounders to blast shipping at Hoedekenskerke. All bombs were on target, hitting either ships or docks. One ship, apparently carrying ammunition, blew up in spectacular fashion and another vessel was left smoking."

In its sixteen months of front line combat service from March 1944 to May 1945, 438 Squadron flew 4022 sorties, dropped 2070 tons of bombs and is credited with 430 rail cuts, 184 vehicles destroyed (+169 damaged), 12 tanks destroyed (+3 damaged), 5 locomotives destroyed (+73 damaged), 101 rail cars destroyed (+532 damaged), 1 barge sunk (+38 damaged), and 5 bridges destroyed. The cost for these successes was high, during the same timeframe, the squadron lost 38 aircraft, 31 pilots, of whom 17 were killed, 5 missing, 6 were captured by the enemy after bailing out and 3 successfully evaded capture after abandoning their aircraft.

=== The Disney connection ===
On February 10, 1944, 438 Squadron pilot and veteran of Alaska, Flight Lieutenant Ross Reid DFC, wrote a letter to Walt Disney requesting a squadron emblem design that could adorn their aircraft. While serving at Annette Island alongside his USAAF colleagues, Reid had noticed the many American military aircraft bearing such intricate designs. Reid received a letter from the Disney Studios dated March 30, 1944 containing the design below that was immediately adopted and painted on the side of the squadron's Typhoons with the addition of a maple leaf as a background. At the end of the war while at Flensburg, Germany awaiting repatriation, squadron members commissioned a unit pin from a local jeweler based on the Disney design (see photo below). The popular Disney design was once again chosen to adorn both aircraft and uniforms of squadron personnel in 1981 following a series of crests worn through the decades. A special CH-146 Griffon nose panel also bears the crest, to be used for special occasions. It is still the emblem of choice for the Wildcats.

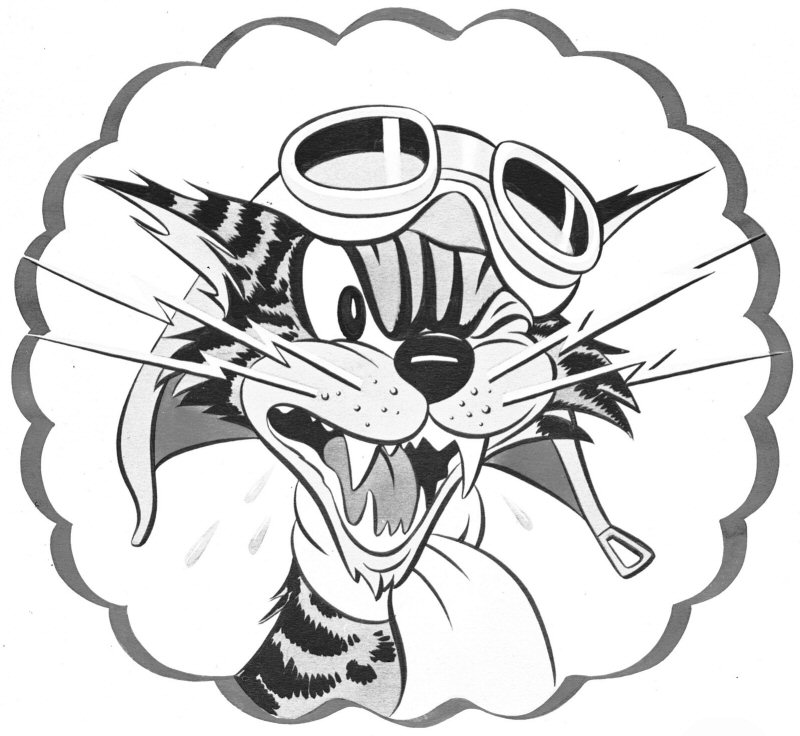
1944 Disney design

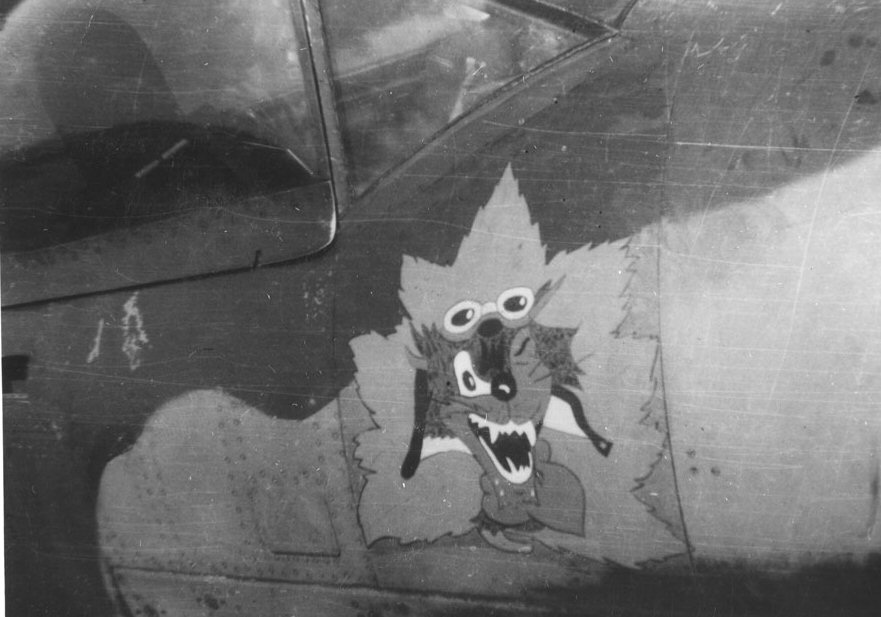
Crest being painted on Typhoon

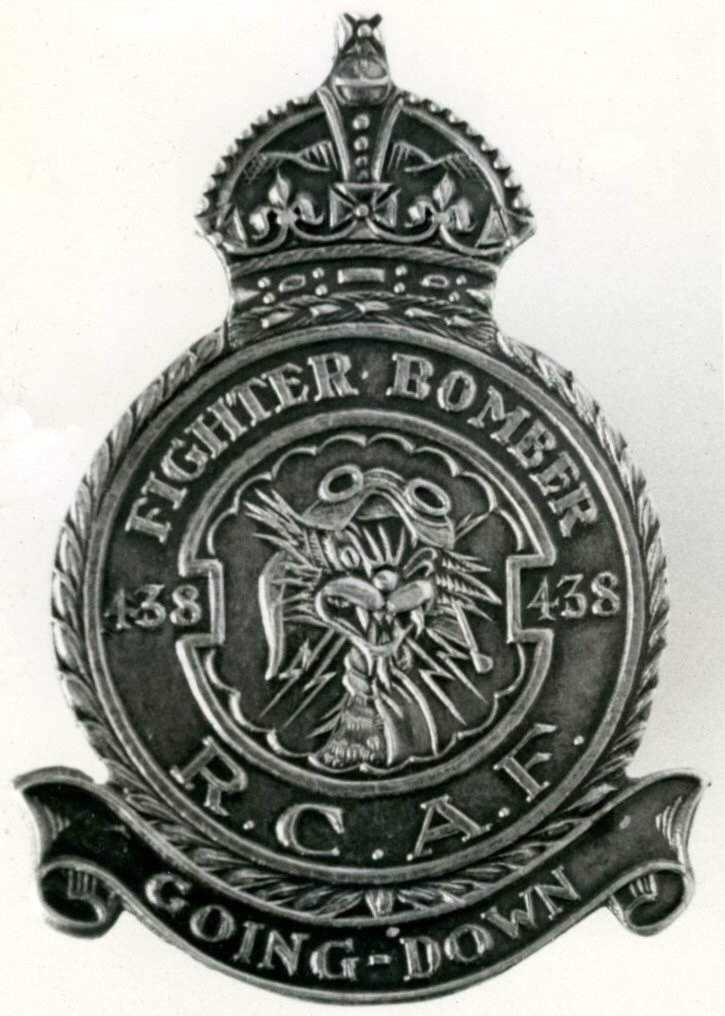
1945 Wildcat pin

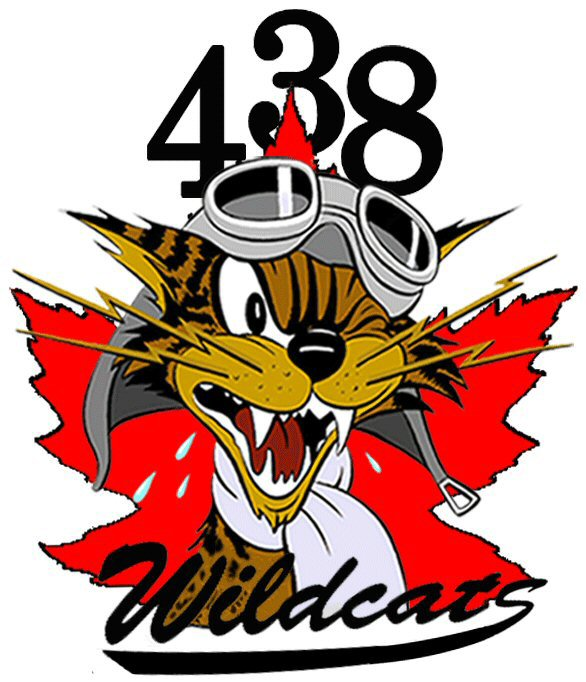
Current crest

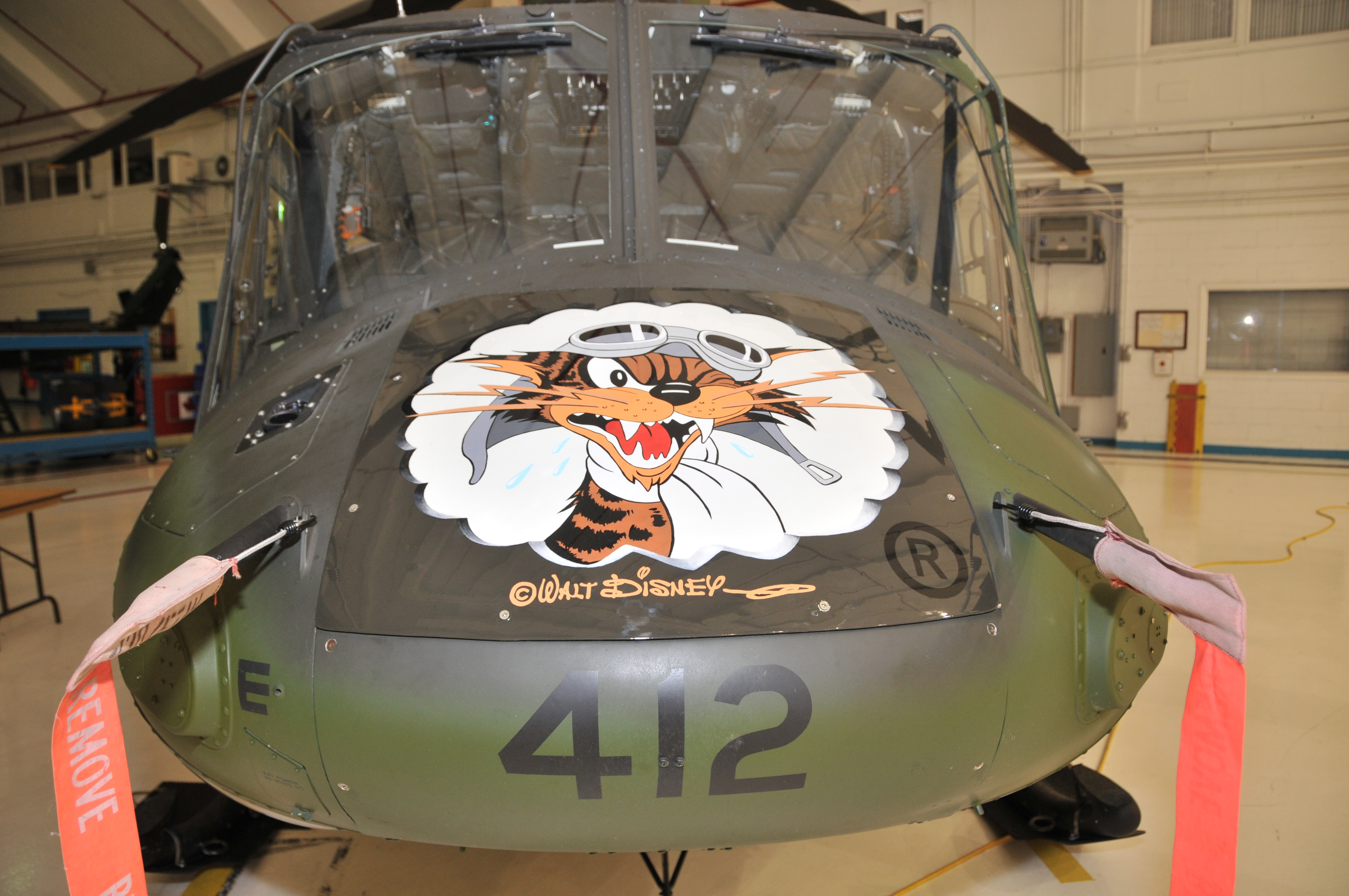
Crest on Griffon nose panel
for special occasions

== Post-war ==
=== Reformation in the auxiliaries ===
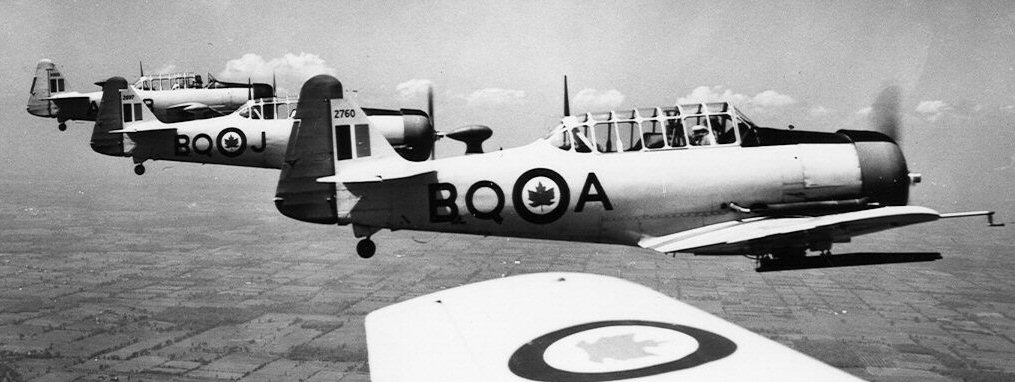
438 (Aux) Squadron Harvards on the way back from rocket firing practice - 1948

438 Squadron was reformed at Montreal on April 15, 1946 as an Auxiliary (reserve) unit once again operating from its old base at St-Hubert. It was equipped with North American Harvard trainers. Its main task was the retention of flying qualifications for newly repatriated aircrew and the training of new personnel. The important population of the greater Montreal area offered a great number of new potential recruits and also attracted a large number of francophone veteran pilots wishing to remain in uniform, albeit on a part-time basis. The new squadron commander, Wing Commander Claude Hébert, D.F.C. managed to bring in many World War 2 combat veterans to fill the ranks. As a result, like in some other newly reformed auxiliary squadrons, a great percentage of the early post-war period pilots were some of the most highly decorated wartime members of the RCAF. The new squadron identifier code is "BQ".

=== The jet age ===
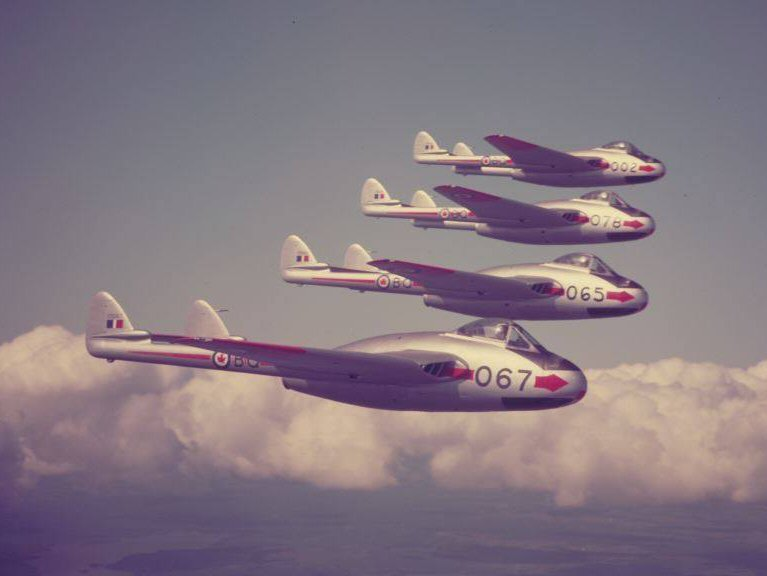
438 Sqn Vampires Mk.III in formation (circa 1952)

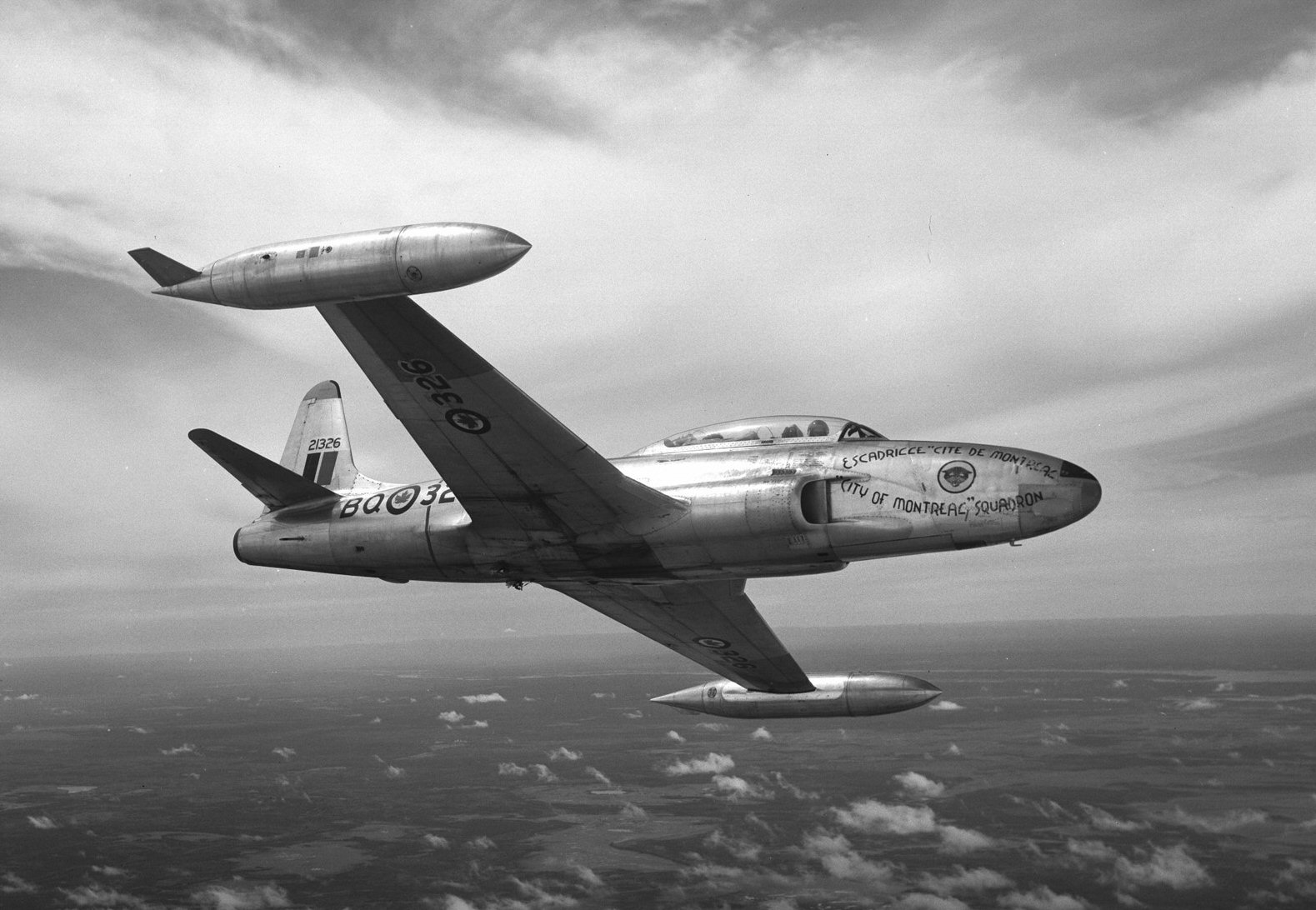
Silver Star Mk.III over St-Hubert (circa 1956)

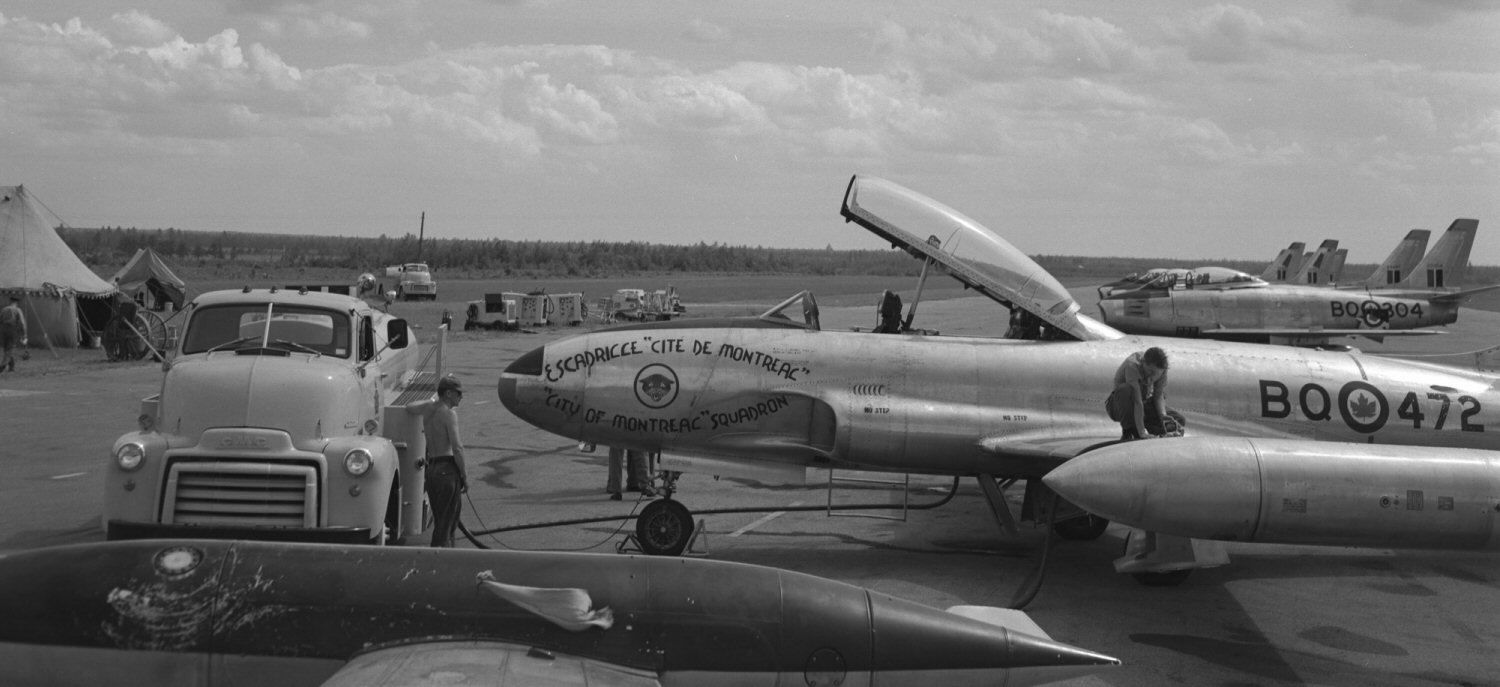
Silver Stars and Sabres at RCAF Chatham N.B., July 1957

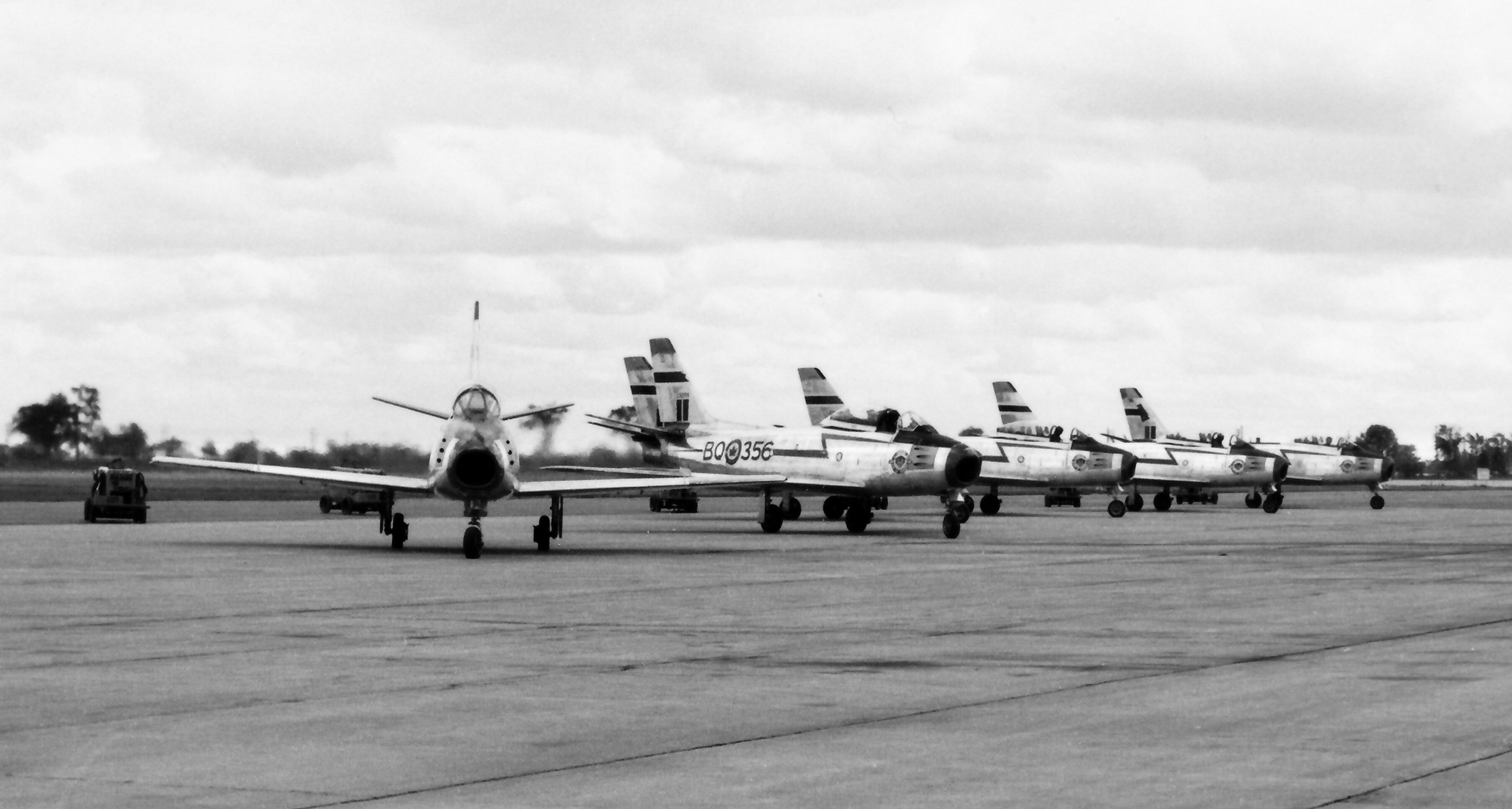
438 Squadron Sabres at RCAF St-Hubert QC ,1958

On April 1, 1947, 438 Squadron regained its wartime designation as 438 (Fighter) Squadron in preparation for its soon-to-arrive new aircraft. The Wildcats became one of the first units to be operational on jet fighters when they began operations on the British designed and built de Havilland Vampire in April 1948. October 1949, the Wildcats of 438 Squadron, alongside their colleagues of 401 Squadron also on Vampires, participated in Operation Metropolis, a large scale joint USAF/RCAF air exercise where the two RCAF jet fighter squadrons, with the assistance of No.1 RCAF mobile radar unit were to defend the greater New York area from formations of American Martin B-26 Marauder bomber squadrons.

On May 1, 1950, the squadron designation was once again amended, this time to include "City of Montreal" making it 438 "City of Montreal" (Fighter) Squadron. This was in recognition of the wartime sponsorship of the Wildcats by the city. The Squadron also received the Freedom of the City of Montreal on October 1 of the same year to officialize the event with a large parade on the Field of Mars.

1954 saw the arrival of the Canadair CT-133 Silver Star, the most modern jet trainer of the era, replacing the Vampires. The "T-birds" as they were commonly called by RCAF personnel, were retained until September 1958 and were used to train new pilots converting to jets, more precisely the Sabre which began arriving at the squadron in October 1956. The Wildcats would keep flying fighters until November 1958 when the role of the auxiliary units was once again reviewed and amended.

=== Light transport & utility ===
On November 1, 1958, 438 Squadron lost its "Fighter" role and received the simpler new designation 438 Squadron. With changing times causing increases in the cost of modern weapons, the complexity of their upkeep, technical advances and new air defence doctrines, Auxiliary squadrons were assigned to mostly secondary support roles. Now equipped with the Beechcraft Expeditor MK.III and relegated to light utility transport, most remaining fighter pilots simply left the service in protest giving the unit a completely new look with a membership of reserve air and ground crews mostly borne from the civilian airline and local aircraft industries.

On May 5, 1961, the unit received its Squadron Standard for 25 years of service from the Queen's representative, the Honourable Gaspard Fauteux, Lieutenant Governor of Quebec. This most noteworthy of events in the life of a squadron was done with a large solemn parade on the ramp at the St-Hubert airbase.

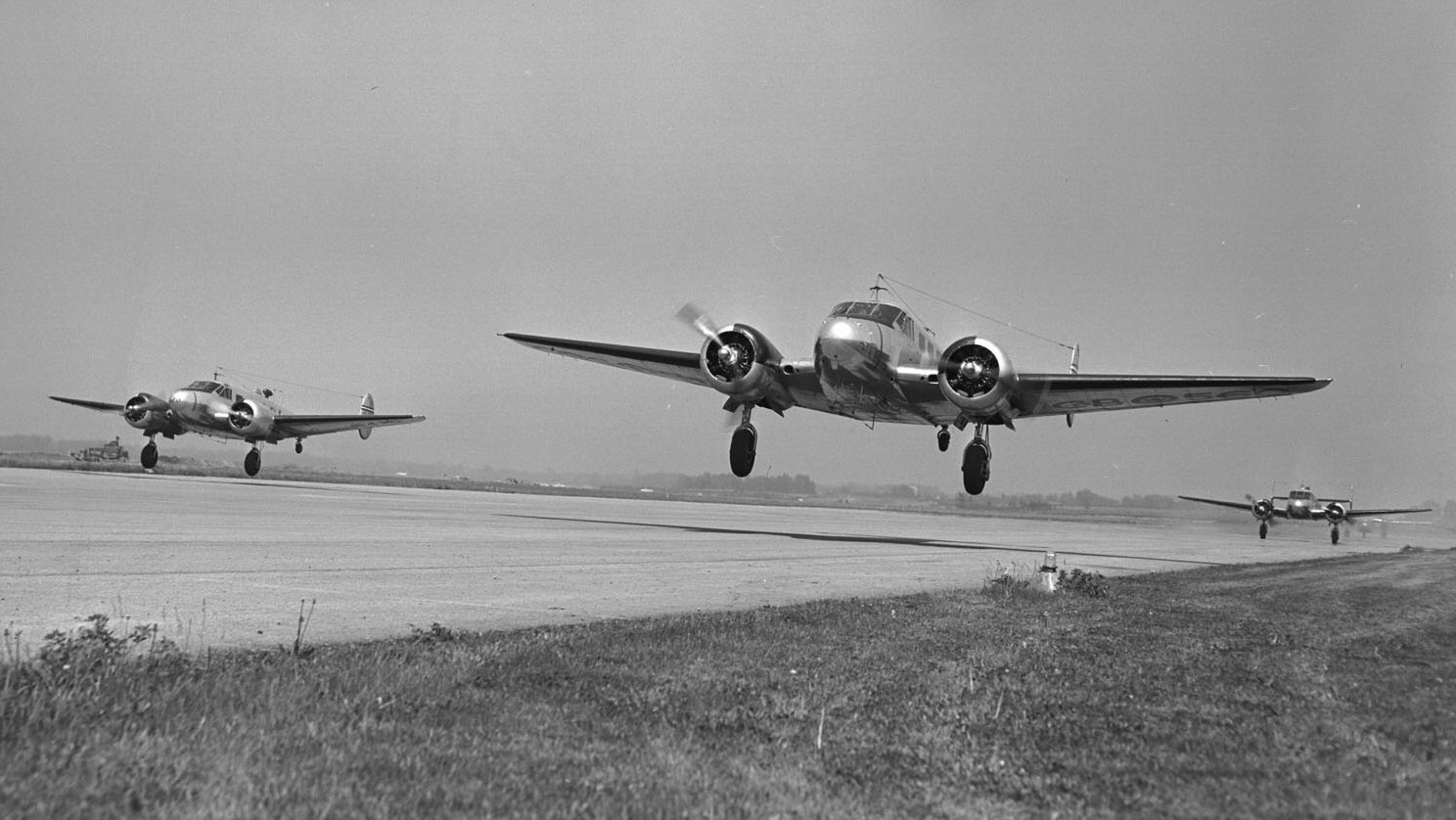
Expeditors taking off in formation at RCAF Station St-Hubert (circa 1960)

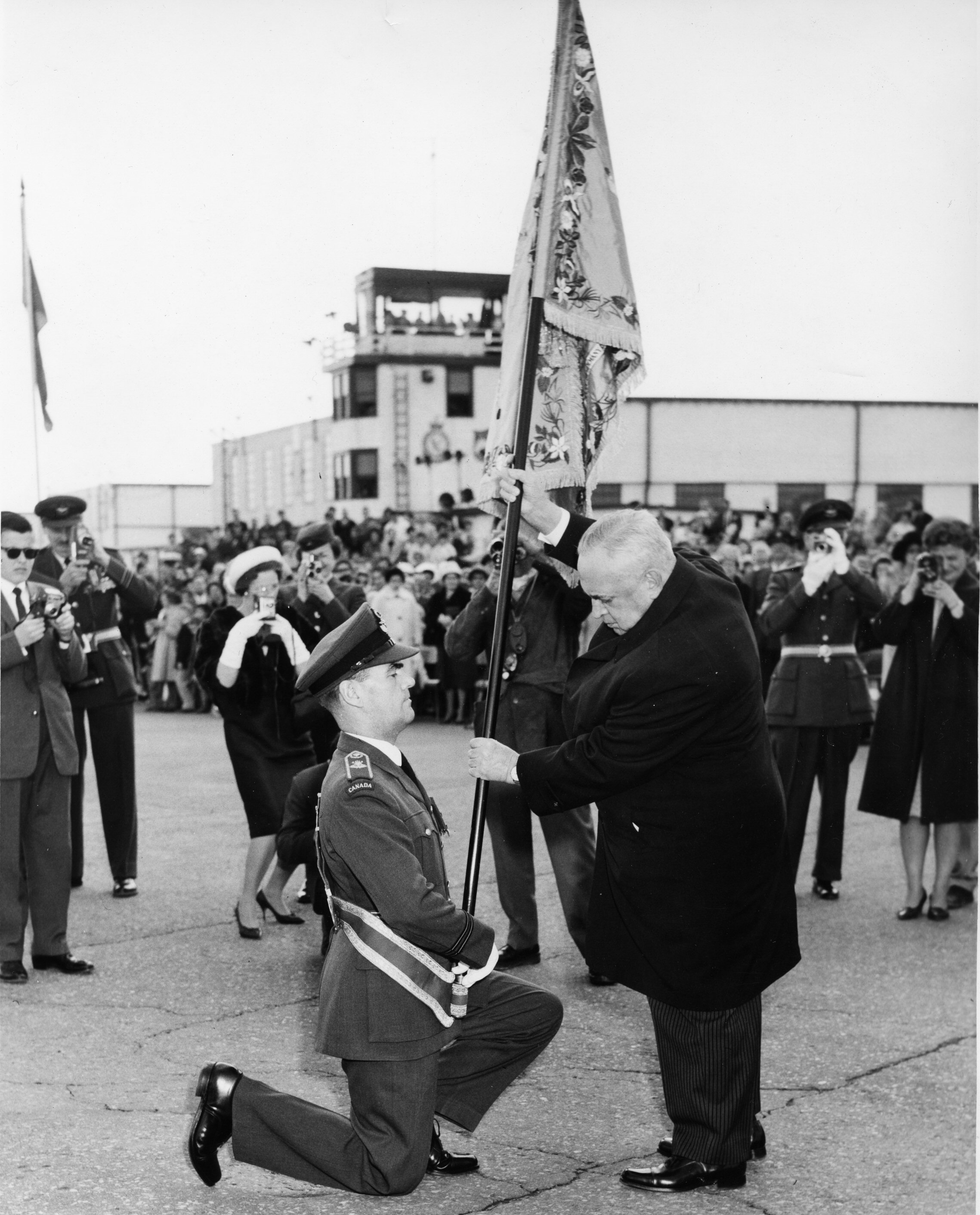
Colours presentation 5 May 1961

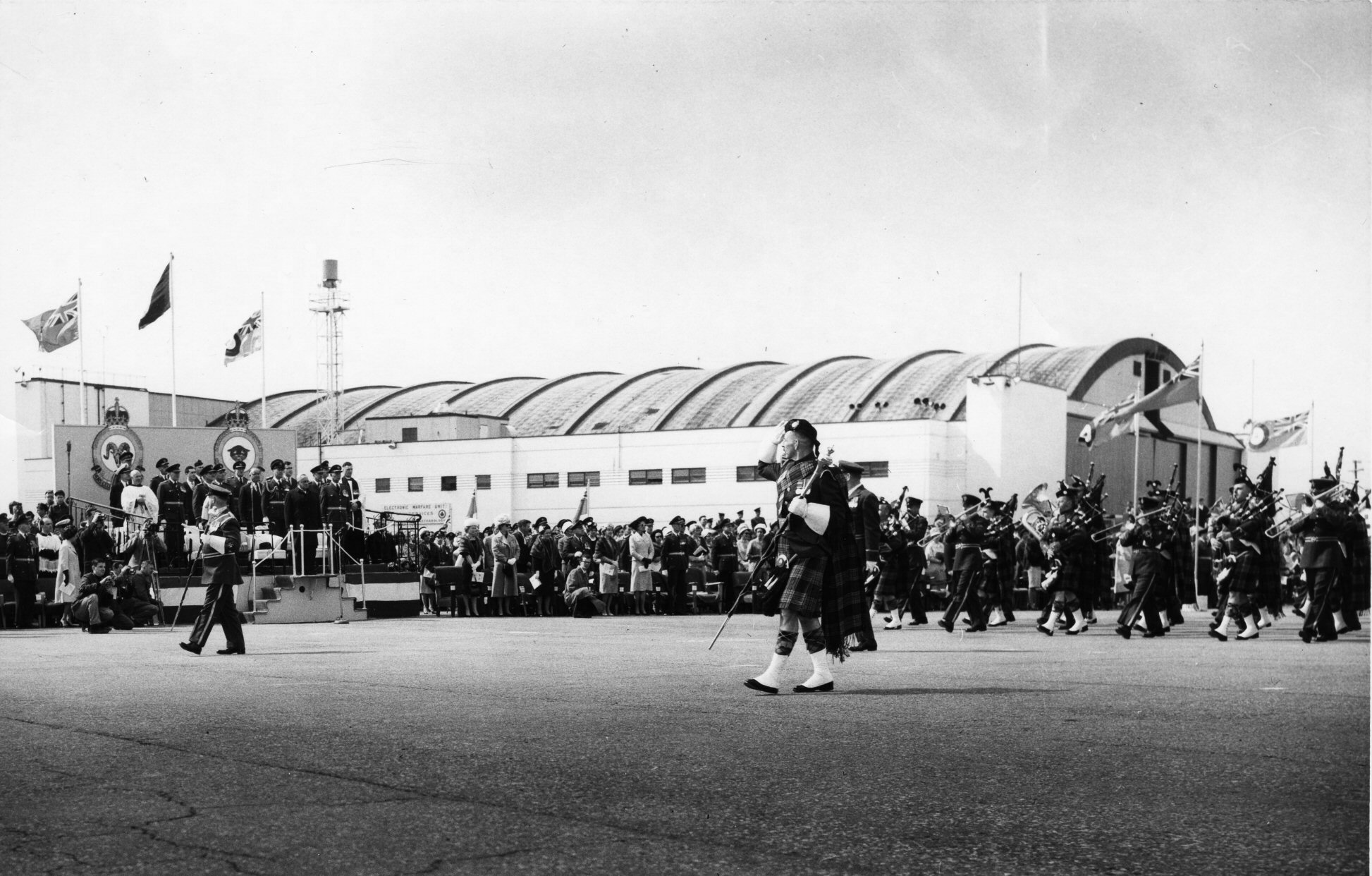
March past of 401 and 438 squadrons during the colours ceremony RCAF Station St-Hubert - 5 May 1961

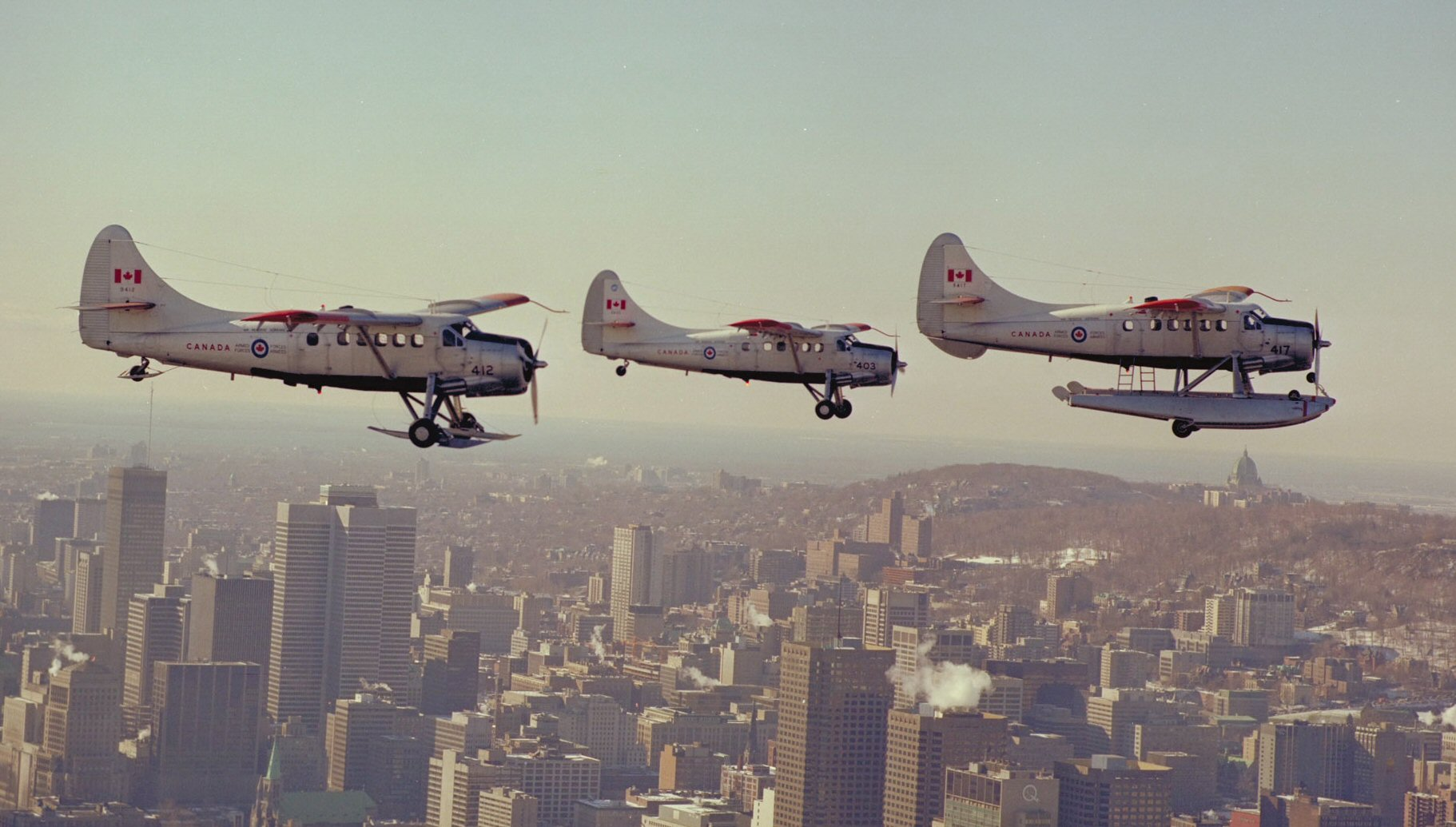
438 Sqn Otters over Montreal with 3 possible landing gear arrangements

The Expeditor would be retained in squadron service until March 1964. For a few years beginning in September 1960, it would share the load with the latest aircraft type assigned to the Wildcats, the sturdy Canadian designed and built de Havilland Canada DHC-3 Otter. To the utility transport role was added Search and Rescue with this new slow but stable platform that could operate from short fields and from bodies of water when fitted with floats.

On February 1, 1968 the squadron was integrated into the new now unified Canadian Armed Forces. On January 1, 1969 it was once again redesignated, this time as 438 Air Reserve Squadron.

The squadron was heavily involved in air operations and airspace security over the greater Montreal area during the 1976 Olympic games. The main Air Operations Center was located within the unit's main hangar and under the command of Colonel Al Gamble, the ex-commanding officer of 438 Squadron. Squadron personnel also serviced multiple fighter aircraft and helicopters also involved in security operations.

=== Light observation helicopter ===
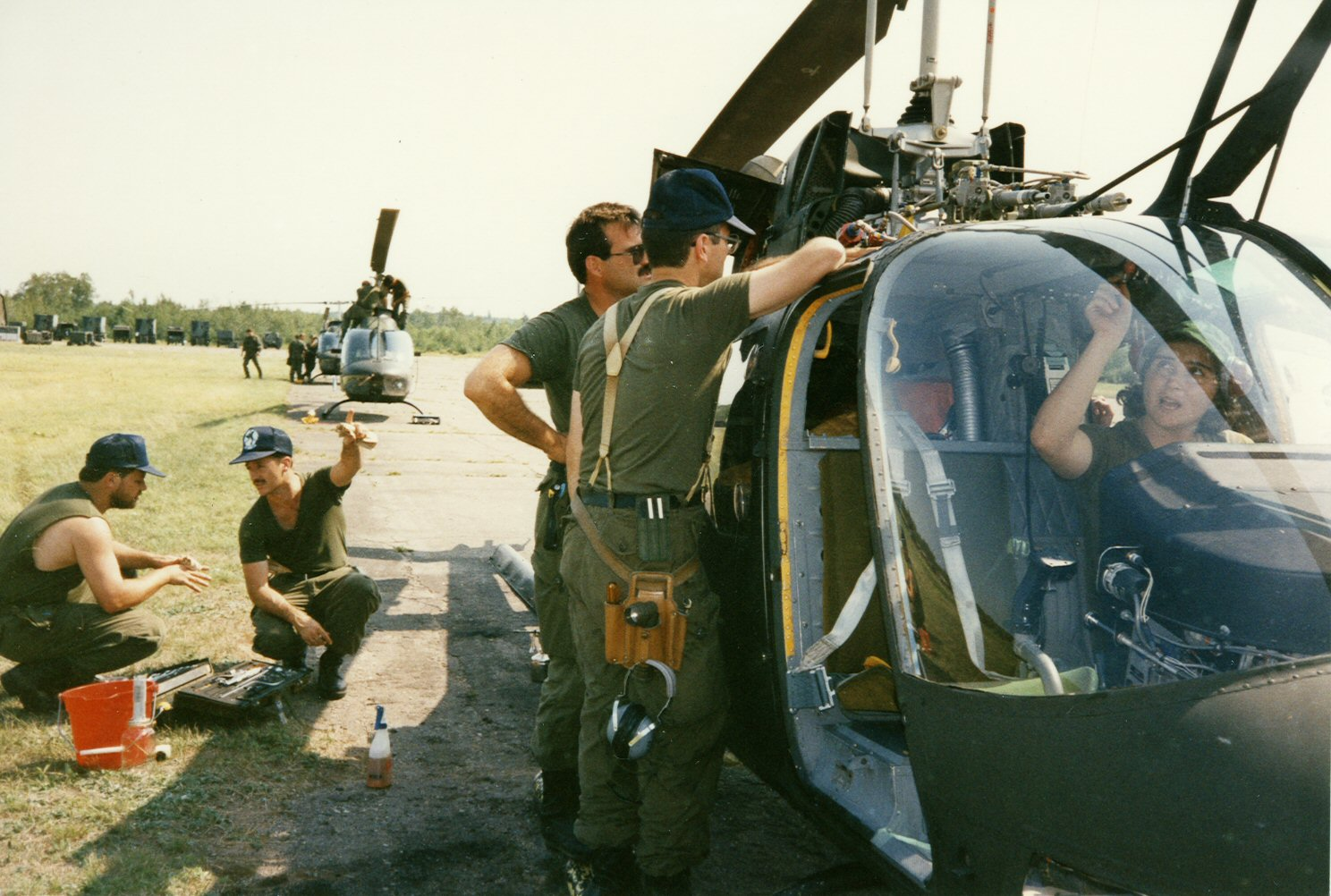
Field maintenance being carried out on Kiowasat CFB Gagetown 1991

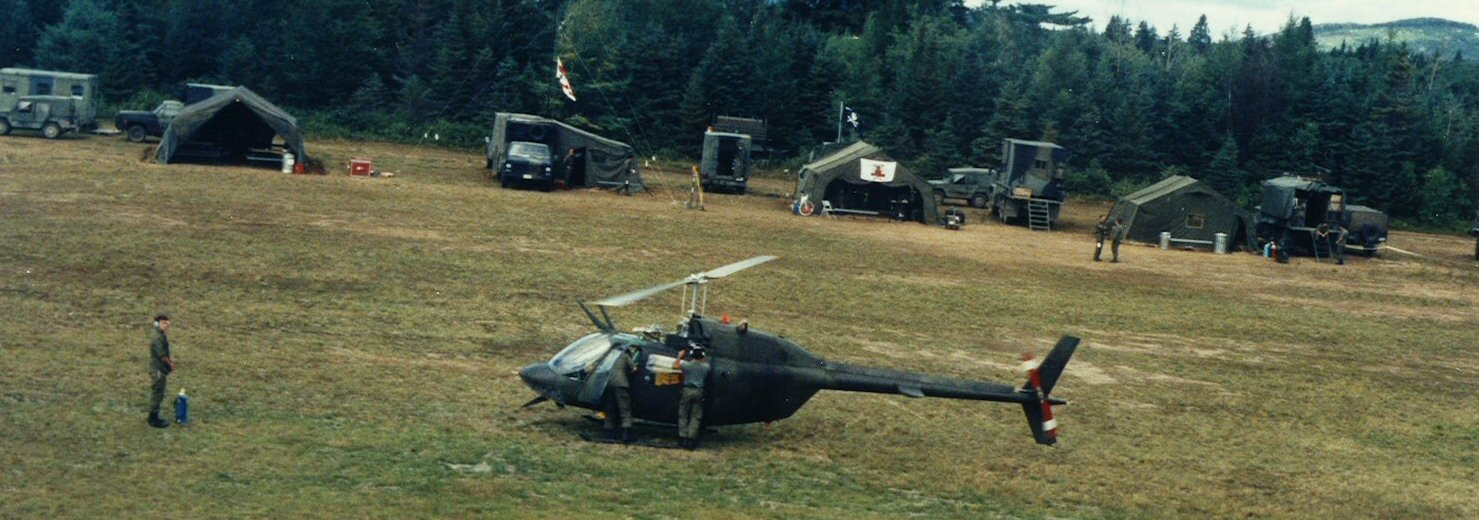
CH-136 Kiowa of 438 Sqn ongoing field maintennace at Valcartier 1992

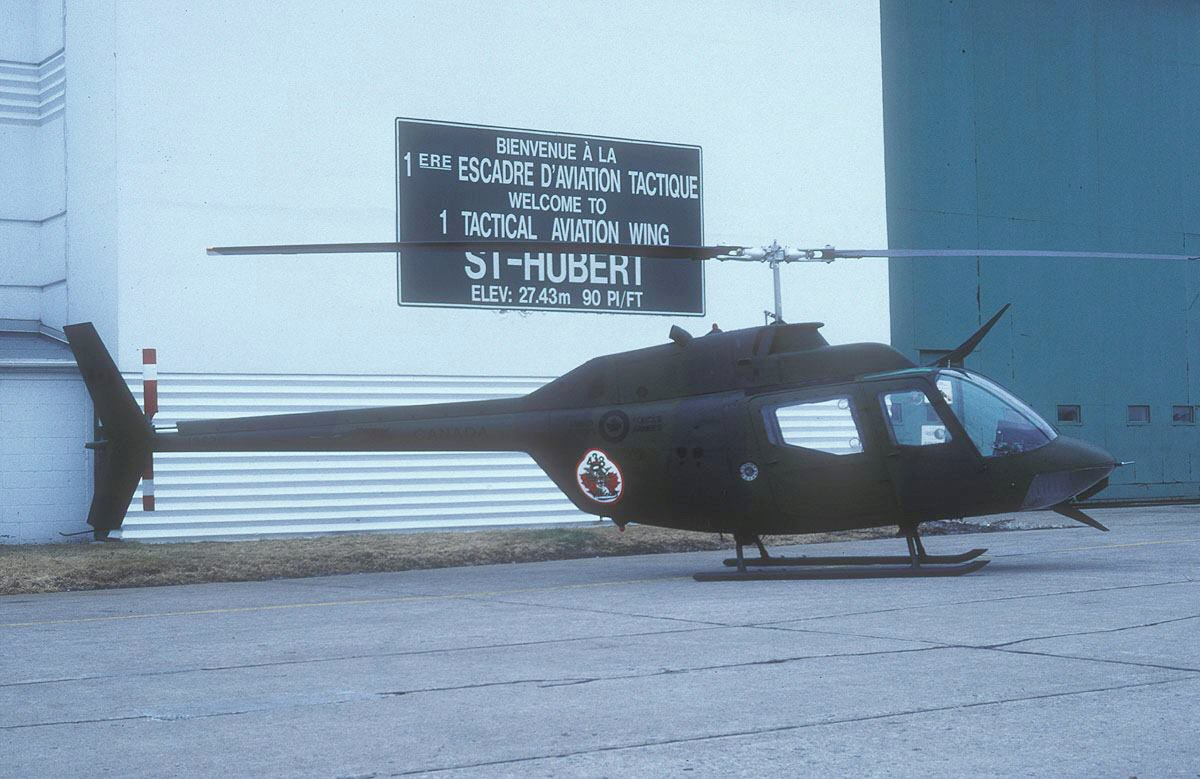
438 Sqn CH-136 Kiowa on the 10 hangar ramp CFB St-Hubert 1995

438 Squadron's role radically changed when its first 4 Bell CH-136 Kiowa light observation helicopters (LOH) arrived in January 1981. The last 438 Squadron Otter was retired in February and helicopter conversion training began in earnest. The squadron would receive a further 5 Kiowas by September of that year, this number would eventually grow to 13 in 1991 with the redistribution of 444 Squadron's aircraft following its deactivation in Germany.

Tactical helicopters working in close relation with the Army, the squadron now mostly flew operations in support of the ground forces and as such, regularly trained with them in yearly brigade and divisional level exercises such as "Rendez-Vous" (RV) or "Noble Lion". Under the overall command of 10 Tactical Air Group and flying the same aircraft as the many Regular Force squadrons under the same command structure, 438 reserve personnel were now poised to offer an ever-increasing domestic and operationally deployed support to these units. Wildcats, both aircrew and groundcrew deployed to Egypt, Honduras, and Haiti as augmentees. These opportunities to serve full time at home and abroad for predetermined time periods would multiply exponentially over the coming years.

Another visible change at the squadron was the application of the term "tactical", the unit had to be mobile and operate away from base. A fleet of specialised vehicles soon arrived and all personnel had to familiarize themselves with them and get used to working in the field away from its main infrastructures. These skills were developed and honed during the many exercises alongside the ground forces.

The unit was only officially redesignated 438 Tactical Helicopter Squadron on April 1, 1993.

== Recent history ==
=== Arrival of the Griffon ===
1995 brought the new CH146 Griffon with its increased capabilities. Squadron cadre aircrews and technicians were sent to the Bell Training Academy in Fort Worth, Texas to get qualified on this new platform. This training has since been received at 403 Helicopter Operational Training Squadron. The Wildcats began receiving their nine aircraft one at a time over the summer months. 1996 brought the biggest changes to date. No.1 Tactical Aviation Support Squadron, an air maintenance unit co-located in St-Hubert, was absorbed by 438 Squadron, as was 401 Squadron which had been the CH-136 Kiowa Operational Training Unit. Although only officially disbanded on 1 January 1998, 401 Squadron only remained active on paper. With 401 Squadron came the Field Tactical Training Flight, formerly the 3 Field Tactical Training Unit moved to St-Hubert from CFB Bagotville the year before. This technical school currently located within the Ecole Nationale d'Aerotechnique also located on the St-Hubert airfield, offers all Griffon related technical training for technicians, maintenance managers, and flight engineers.

All of these unit mergers changed the face of the squadron now composed of nearly as many members of the Regular Force as reservists. Simultaneously, 10 Tactical Air Group was also disbanded and all Tactical helicopter squadrons now found themselves under 1 Wing HQ at CFB Kingston.

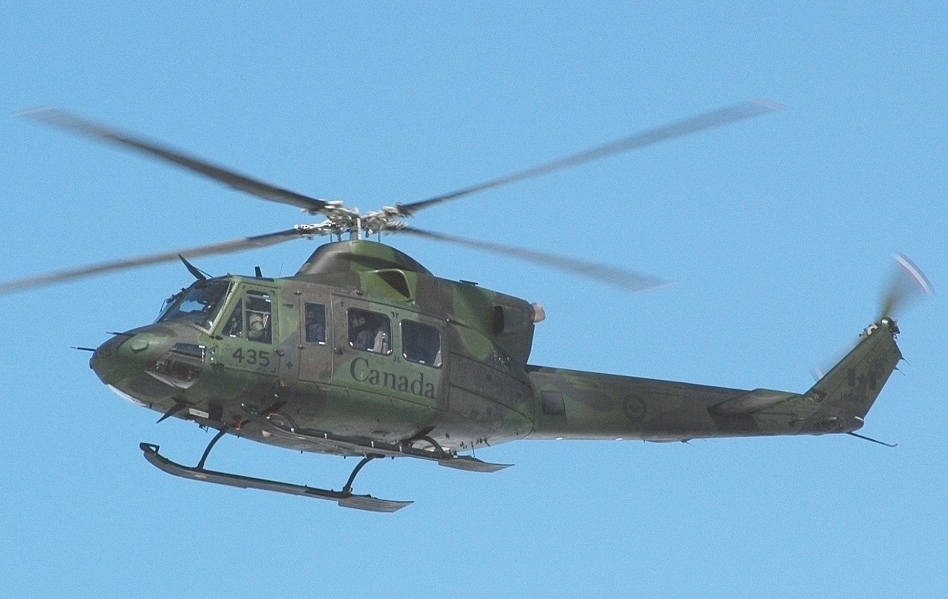
438 Sqn operates the CH-146 Griffon since 1995.

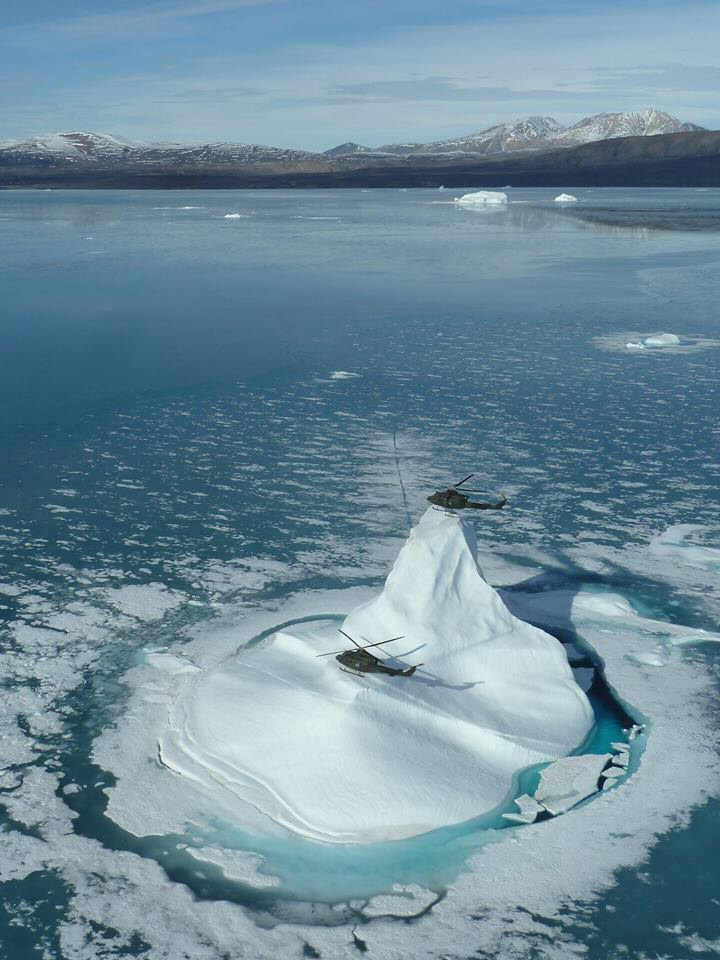
Griffons of 438 Sqn at Otto Fiord in Nunavut

=== Operations ===
Now flying the same aircraft as other 1 Wing units and able to rely on a greater number of full-time personnel, 438 Squadron was called upon to more actively participate in many domestic and international operations, not merely as augmentees but now also as a unit. Since operating on the Griffon, in addition to exercises and their normal duties to ground forces, the Wildcats have regularly flown domestically in support of drug enforcement agencies, in the Canadian Arctic from CFS Alert, played a major role during the 1998 Ice Storm, in relief efforts following floods or forest fires in British Columbia, Manitoba, Ontario, Quebec and the Maritimes, in support of the 2002 royal visit to Canada, the G8 summit in Alberta, and in Search and rescue support in Quebec and Ontario, among many other missions in support to the Canadian population.

As early as 1997, 438 Squadron personnel were deployed to Haiti. 1998 saw the Wildcats begin arriving in Bosnia and Herzegovina, a co-deployment with 430 Tactical Helicopter Squadron where the Wildcats led a few of the rotations, a first for the unit. Wildcats remained present in Bosnia and Kosovo until late 2001 either with 438 or as augmentees with other 1 Wing units.

=== Afghanistan ===
2002 saw the arrival of the CU-161 Sperwer drone, a new capability within the RCAF. Cadre squadron personnel were trained in France. The Wildcats would lead 2 rotations in Afghanistan on this reconnaissance platform and would send augmentees to other units during theirs. RCAF CH-146 Griffons and CH-147 Chinooks began operating in combat over Afghanistan in support of ground troops in January 2009. Although not deployed operationally as a Griffon unit to this conflict, 438 Squadron provided both air and ground crews, operations, and logistical personnel during the entire length of operations of all three platforms. In fact, Wildcats were in theatre during 16 of the 17 rotations sent to Afghanistan in Kabul and Kandahar between 2003 and 2011.

The aircraft maintenance echelon of 438 Squadron modified the twelve Griffons chosen for operations over Afghanistan during December 2008, prepared them for shipping, and loaded them on RCAF CC-177s for the long trip. They were also responsible for the heavy maintenance and the 60 periodic inspections required over the years to keep the CH-146 flying in theatre. Many unit reservists left their civilian jobs and accepted temporary full-time employment during this time period to ensure the unit met this demanding task with rigid timeframes. When taking into consideration the relatively small size of the unit, it is worthy of mention that even with personnel on duty abroad and domestic operations still running, that all deadlines were met. The end of operations in Afghanistan brought all the Wildcats back home to their normal garrison duties in St-Hubert with returning personnel manning the now almost yearly domestic operations, such as drug enforcement, Arctic resupply, and flood relief.

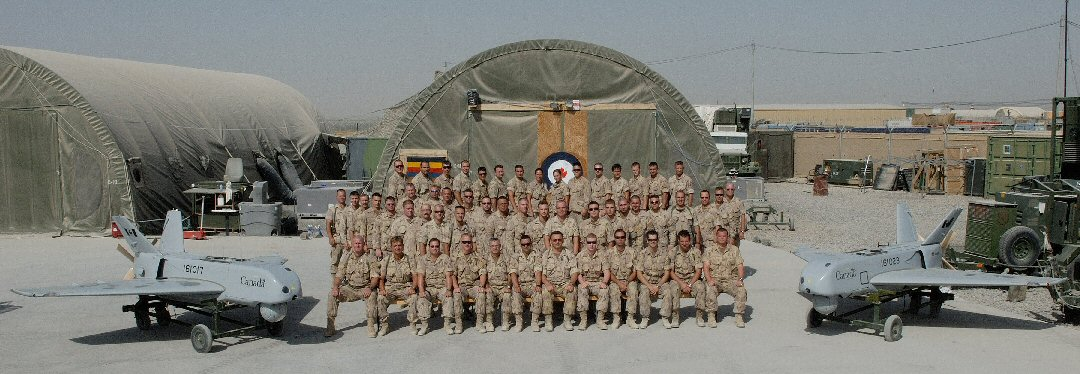
438 Sqn personnel in Afghanistan with Sperwers

International Security Assistance Force logo

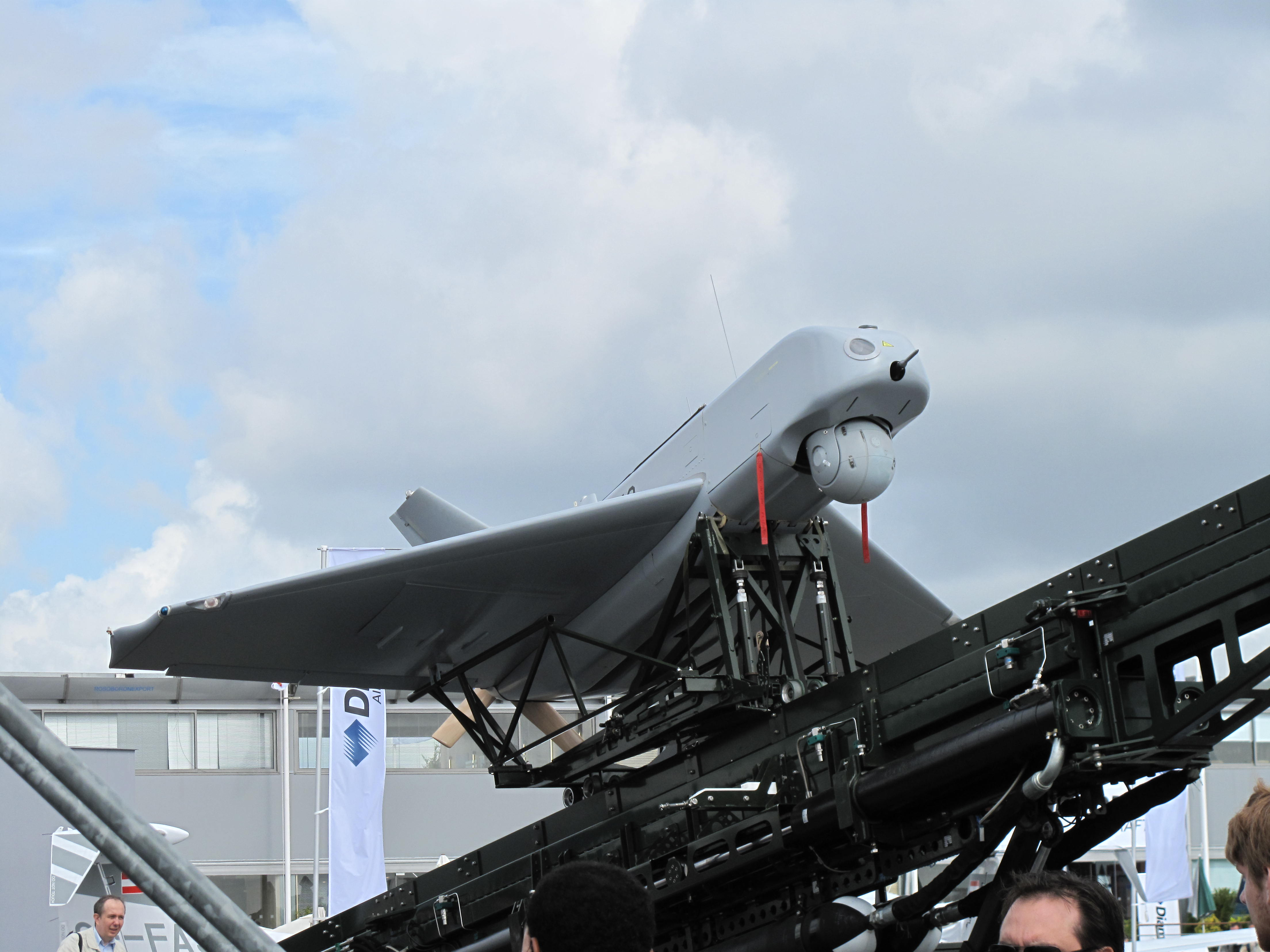
Sagem CU-161 Sperwer.

=== Arctic rescue ===
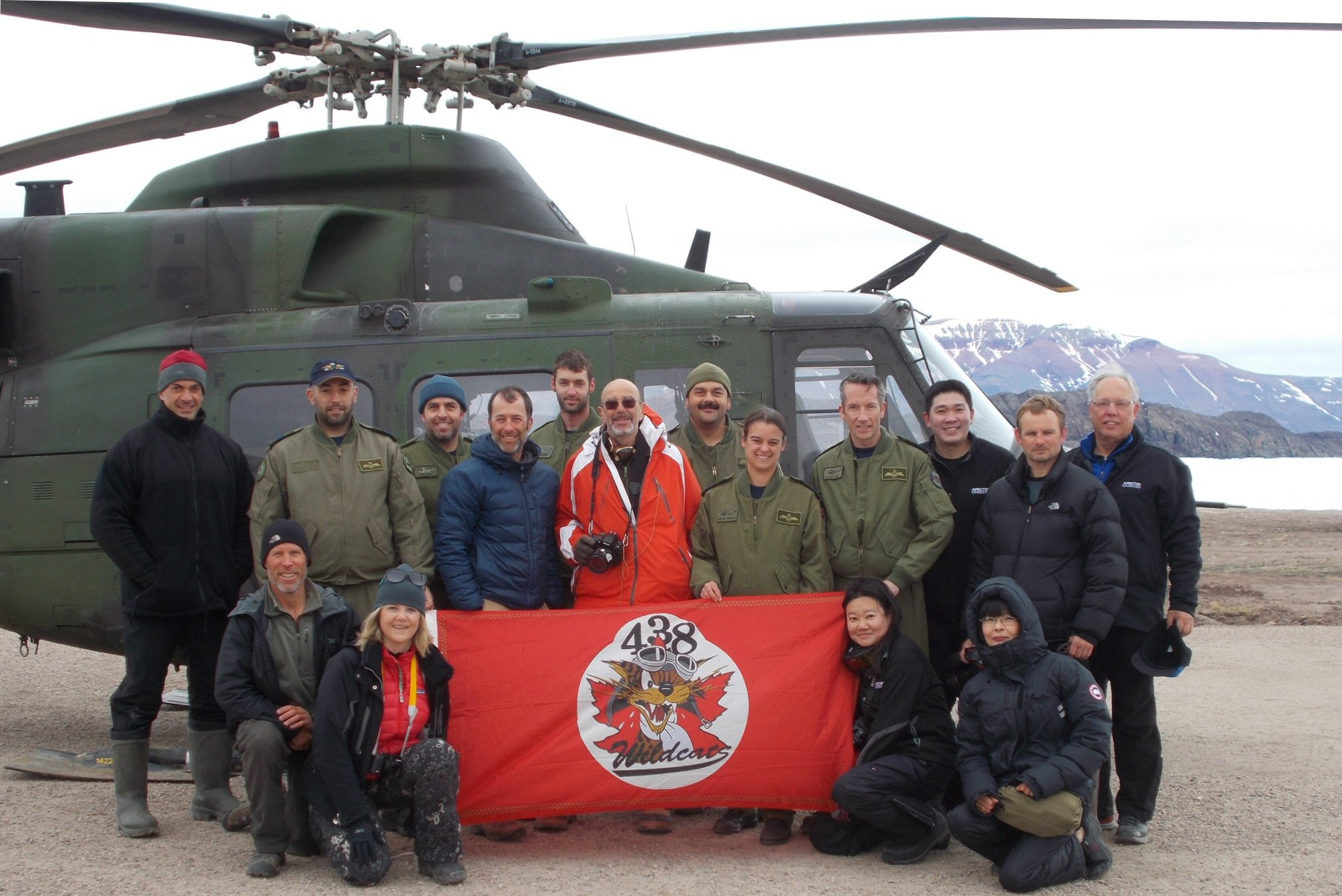
crews of the two CH-146 helicopters with some of the rescuees at Arctic Bay Nunavut - 27 June 2013

On 25 June 2013, two 438 Squadron Griffons operating out of Eureka, Nunavut as part of Op Nevus, were diverted to assist in what would become one of the largest Arctic rescue missions in Canadian history. Two groups, the first composed of some twenty international tourists and guides, the second composed of eleven Inuit hunters, became stranded on an ice floe in Admiralty Inlet, near Arctic Bay, Baffin Island. Aware of the peril they were in, drifting erratically on a deteriorating ice raft, both groups independently triggered their GPS rescue beacons.

The RCAF Joint Rescue Coordination Centre at CFB Trenton Ontario sprang into action launching a CC-130 Hercules from 424 Transport and Rescue Squadron out of 8 Wing Trenton. A CH-149 Cormorant helicopter from 103 Search and Rescue Squadron out of 9 Wing Gander Newfoundland began the trip North to assist with the extraction in the event that hoist capabilities were required. Seven hours after the initial call for help, the Hercules appeared over the group and dropped three 20-man covered life rafts, survival gear, and satellite phones from its tail gate, and its crew measured the size of the shrinking ice island. Flying conditions, however, were poor, horizontal rain, sleet, fog, low cloud and high winds delayed any air rescue, grounding the CH-149 Cormorant helicopter at Hall Beach, and the two CH-146 Griffon helicopters at Grise Fiord. The weather cleared enough the next day for the Griffons to reach the two groups and extract all 31 people safely in multiple round trip flights to Arctic Bay. A rescue for which 438 Squadron would later receive a commendation from the commander of the Canadian Joint Operations Command.

=== New flights ===
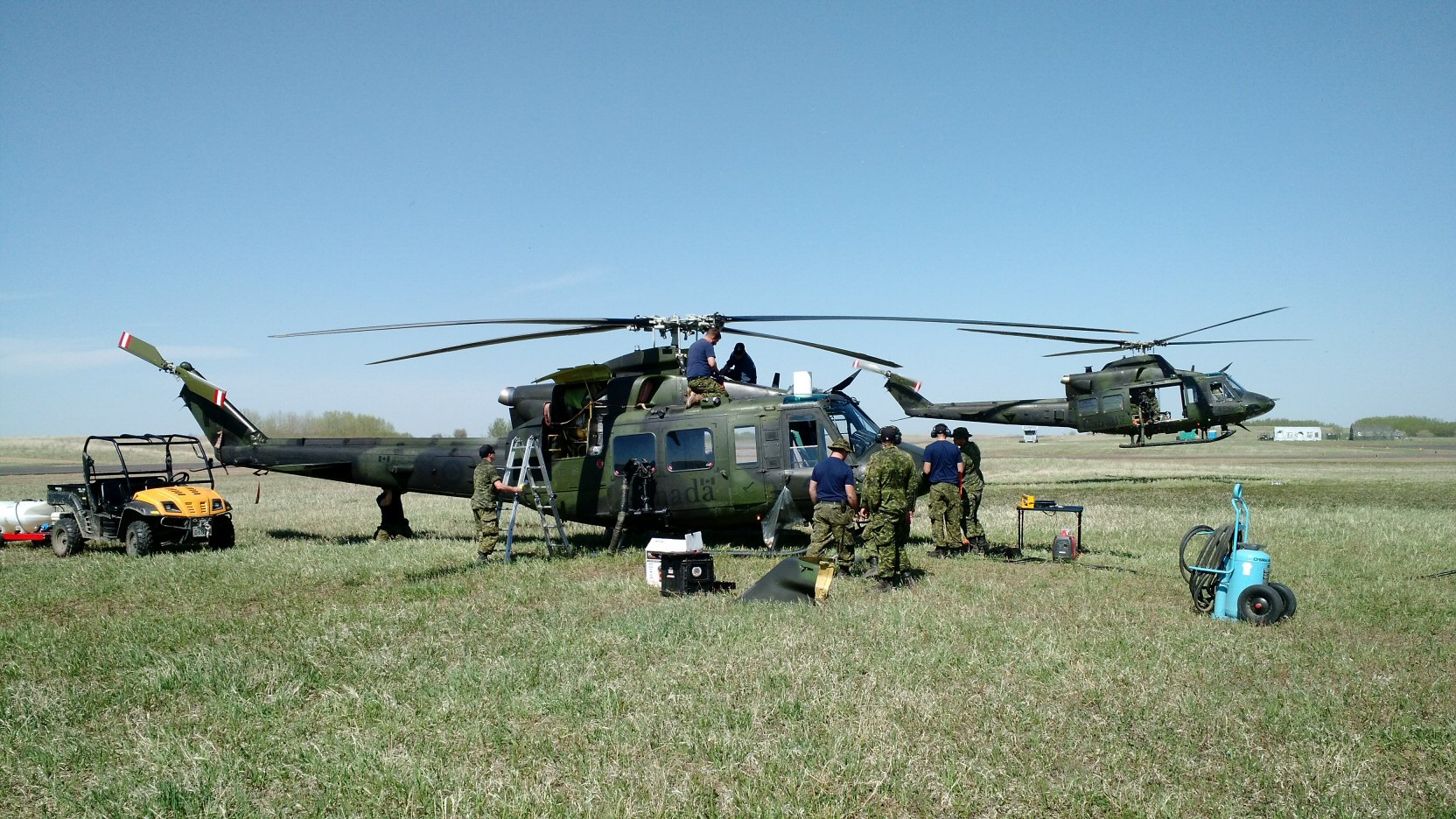
438 Squadron CH-146 Griffons being serviced in the field

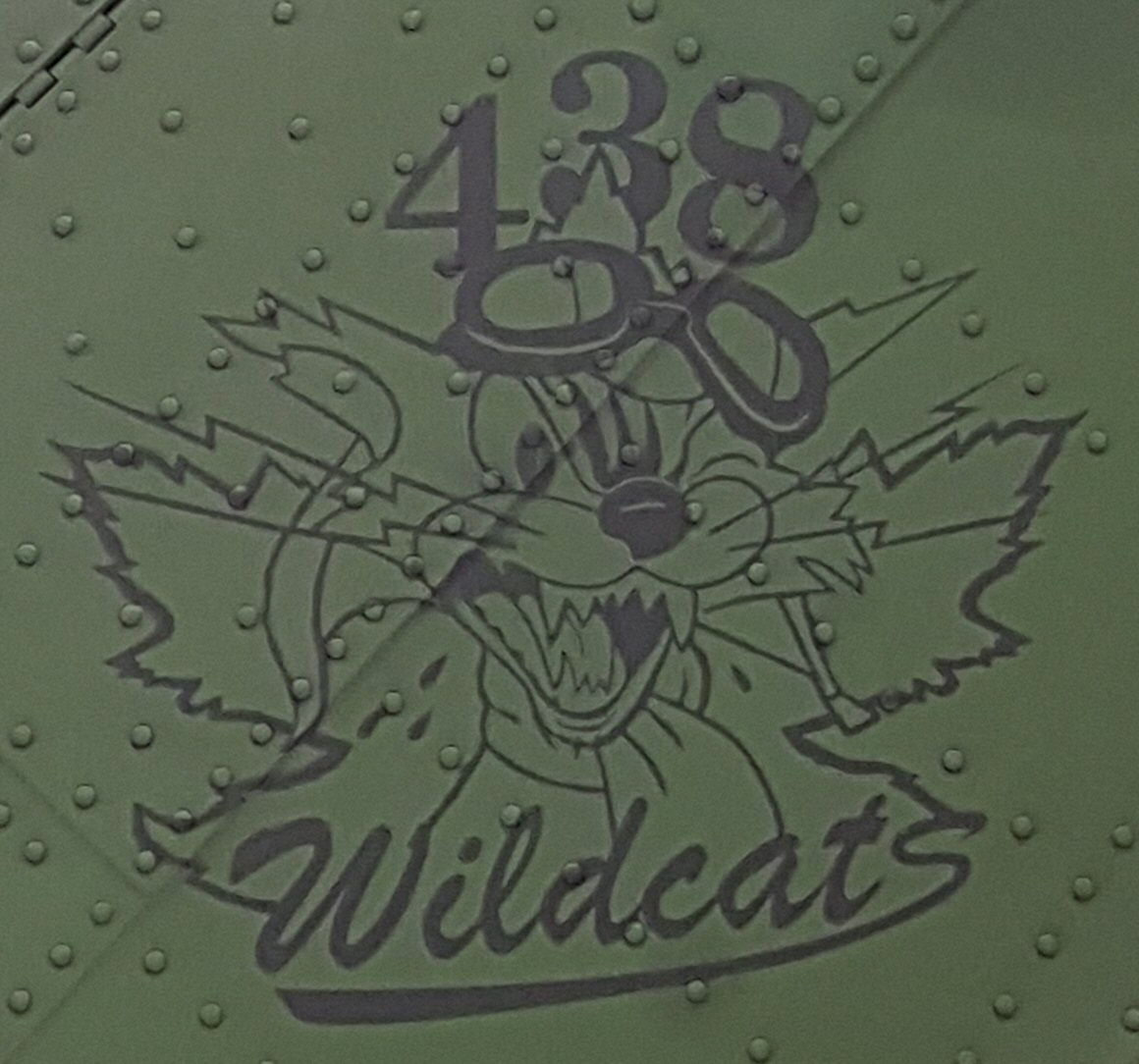
Wildcat emblem as displayed on 438 Squadron Griffons

2015 brought new challenges to 438 Squadron when the Aviation Tactics Flight (ATF) was transferred from 403 Squadron. Its mandate is to conduct advanced training at different levels of air tactics preparing future Flight Commanders and Operations Officers for key flying and decision-making positions during operational deployments. The academic portion of the training is followed by an extensive flying phase in the field at bases with large exercise areas. The Wildcats now coincidentally and regularly hone their fieldcraft abilities through their continued support to these successive courses.

The summer of 2016 saw yet another flight arriving from 403 Squadron, the Land Aviation Test and Evaluation Flight (LATEF). Its mandate is to conduct, on behalf of 1 Wing, operational and tactical testing of land aviation helicopter systems and support equipment, and to propose operational and tactical doctrine where applicable. It is integrally involved in the testing and improvement of CH-146 Griffon and CH-147F Chinook systems. Although still operating within the 438 Squadron infrastructure and relying on logistical and technical support from the Wildcats, LATEF was transferred to 434 Squadron, reactivated as a test and evaluation unit in May 2018 and headquartered at CFB Trenton.

=== NATO Mission Iraq ===
The fall of 2018 brought a surprise to the Wildcats. The squadron would lead and man two consecutive 6-month-long operational deployments to Iraq in the form of a Tactical Aviation Detachment (TAD) composed of 3 CH-146 Griffons as part of Operation Impact in support of the new Canadian led NATO Mission Iraq. Following intense pre-deployment training in Canada, the advanced party of the initial rotation (Roto 0) arrived at their new base of operations in early November, Camp Taji just north of Baghdad, closely followed by the main body at the end of the same month.

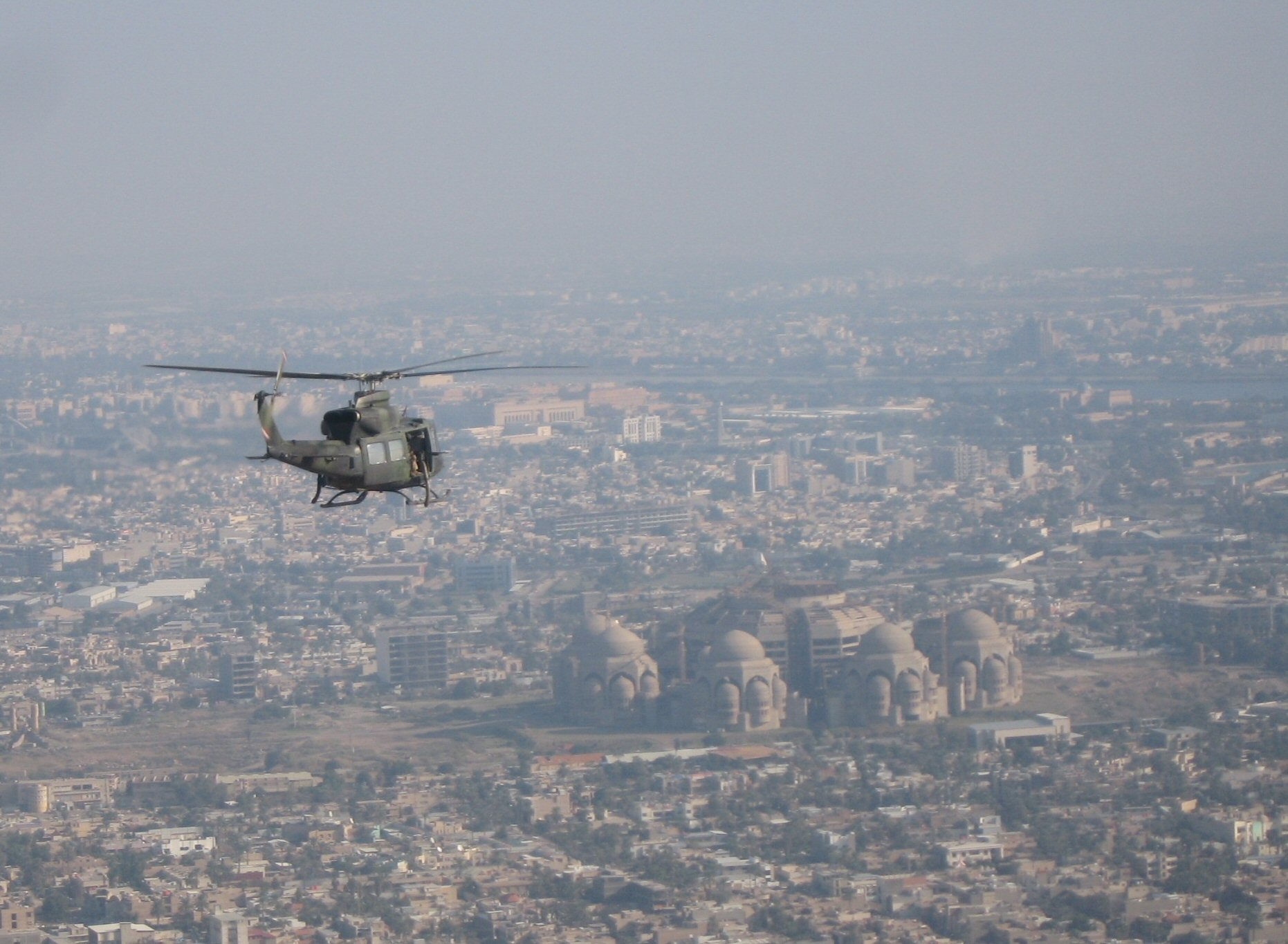
438 Sqn CH-146 Griffon over Baghdad in 2019

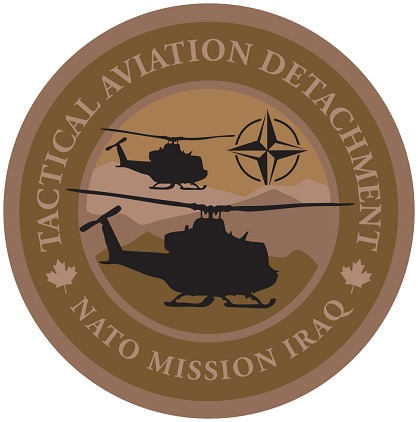
Tactical Aviation Detachment RCAF emblem

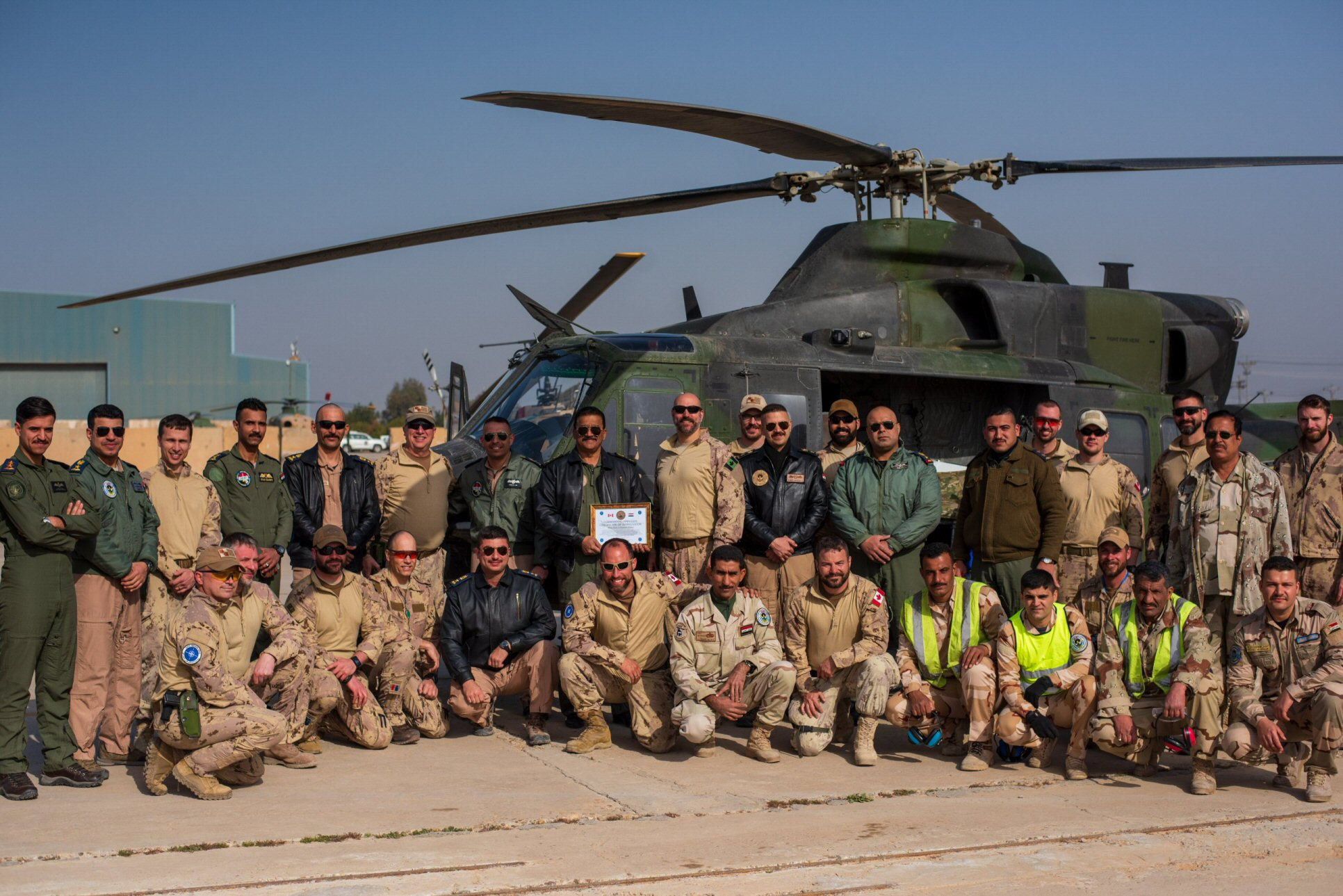
438 Sqn personnel visiting their counterparts of 2 Sqn Iraqi Army Air Corps at Taji Iraq in 2019

Through ingenuity, initiative, and risk management, the Wildcats were able to begin flying operations within a mere two weeks of hitting the ground. Tactical air transport being the only safe means of travel between the multiple training areas, this Canadian asset was crucial to the initial phases and remained critical to the success of this multinational endeavor. Roto 1 took over from Roto 0 in mid-June 2019 and faced the high summer desert heat. During their near 13 months in theatre, the Wildcats airlifted over 3,100 personnel and 21,000 lbs of cargo. 408 Squadron from CFB Edmonton took over the reins of the TAD from 438 in December with the last Wildcat returning home on the 21st.

== 438 Squadron Band ==
Since the very beginning, albeit with a lull during the war years, military music has been present in the activities of the Wildcats. From a small bugle and drum corps in the 1930s, to a brass and reed band in the 1960s, to the present full 35 piece professional military band. Their reserve status notwithstanding, the members of the 438 Squadron Band are all professional musicians with many possessing remarkable academic achievements in their field.

They have over the years, and continue to offer to this day, countless concerts and have also performed in various media events varying from the televised openings of professional football and hockey games to the official opening ceremony of the new Samuel de Champlain bridge in Montreal in 2019.

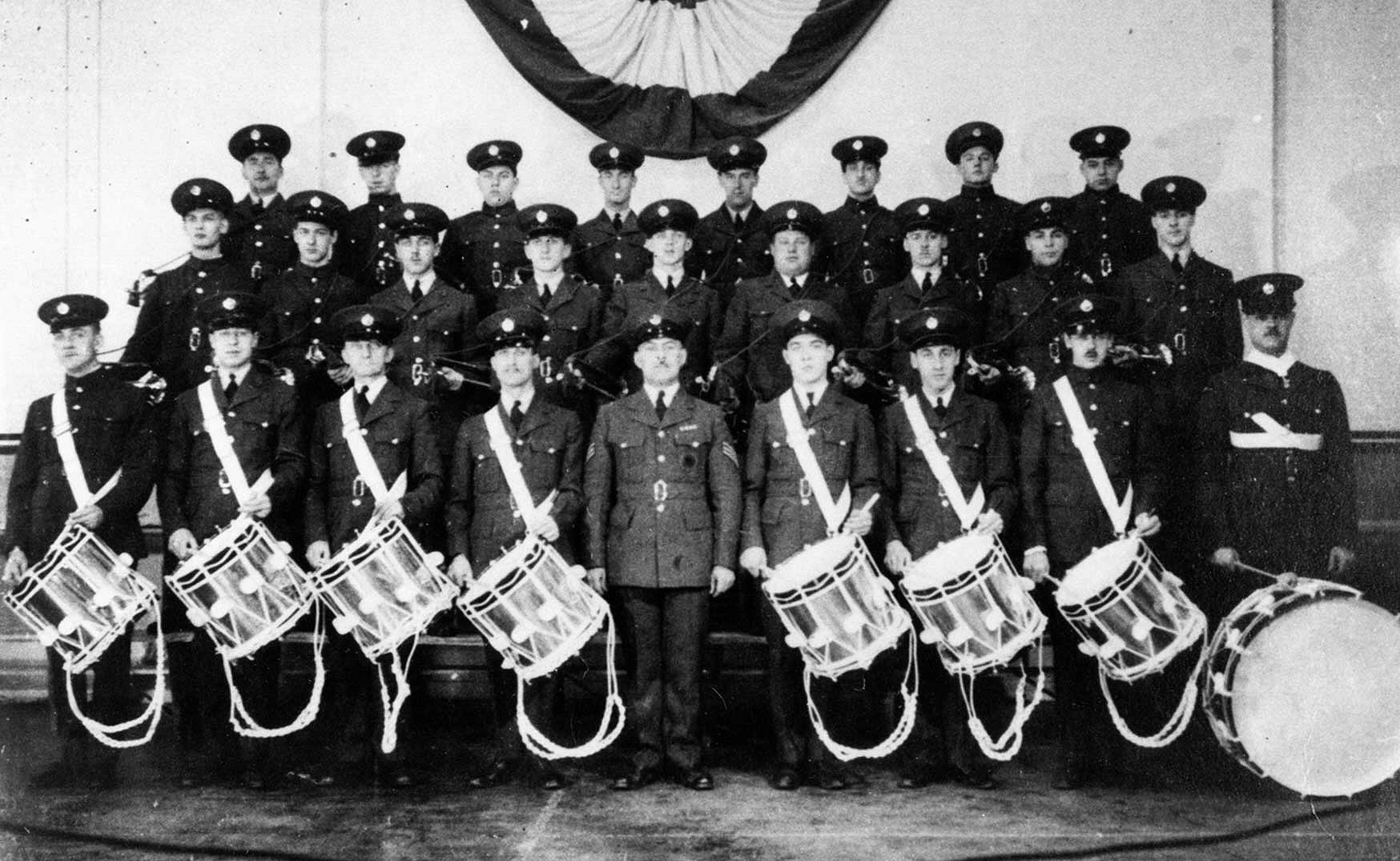
118 Squadron Drum & Bugle Band in 1939

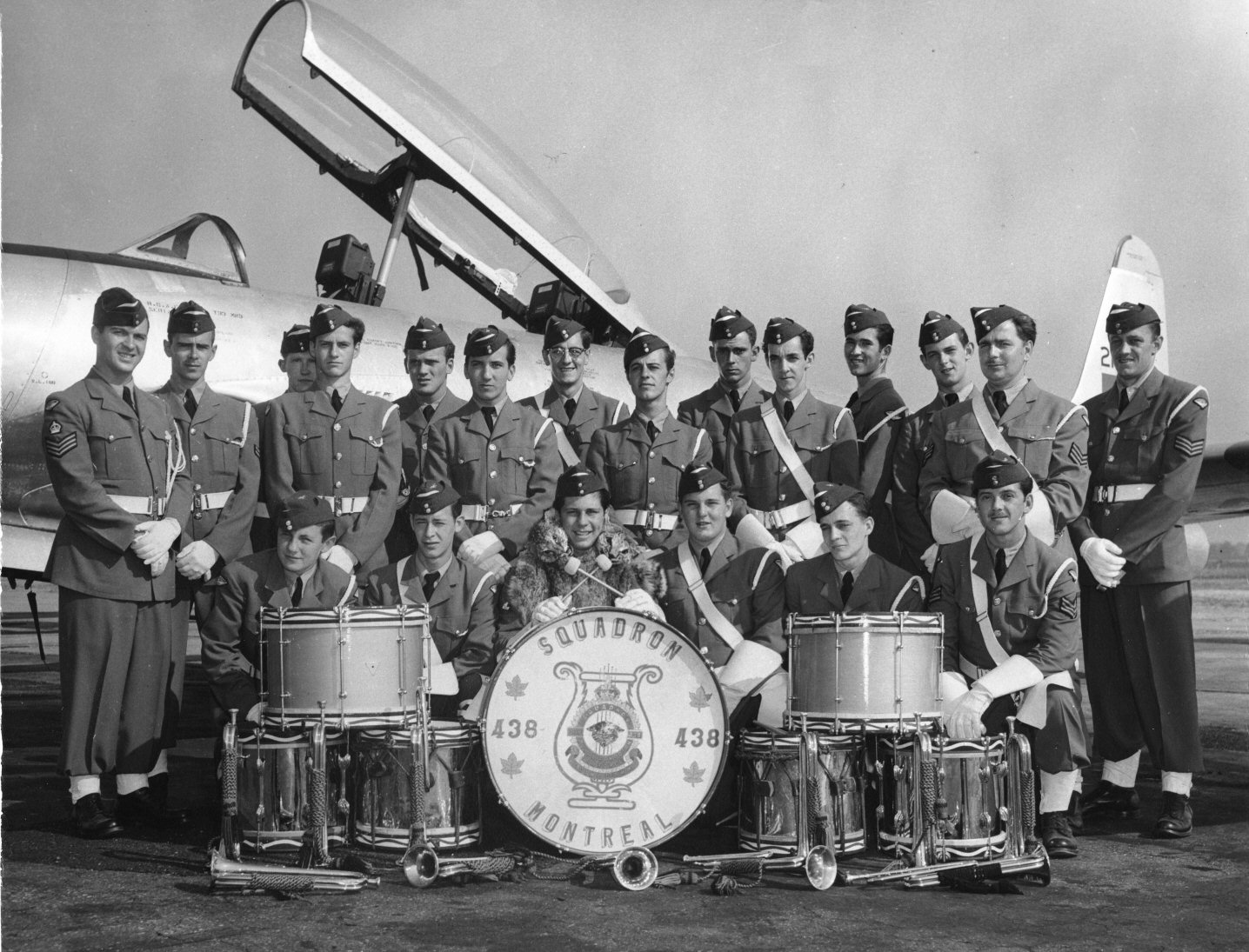
438 Squadron Band in the 1950

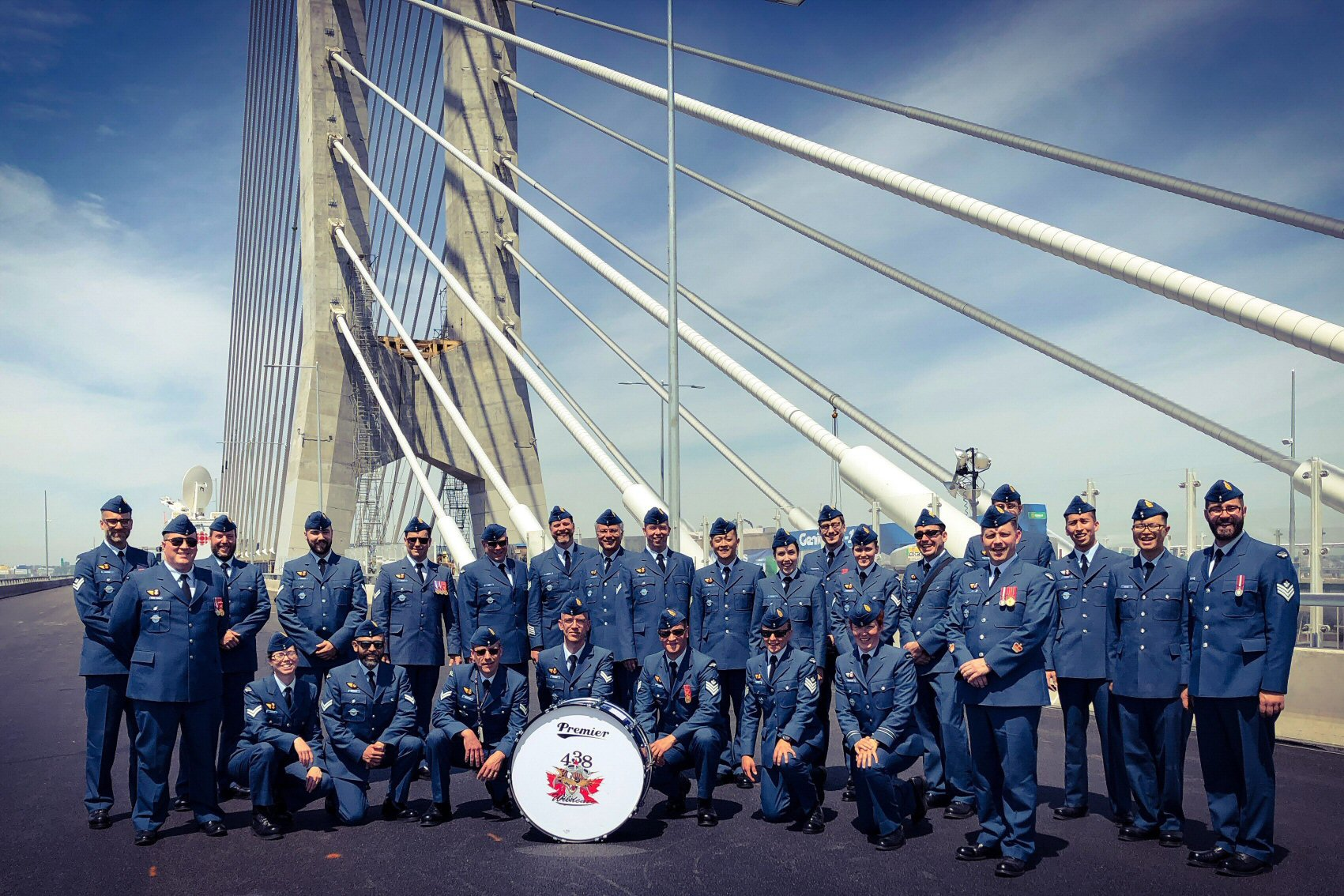
438 Squadron Band at the opening of the Champlain bridge in Montreal - 2019

== Commanding officers ==
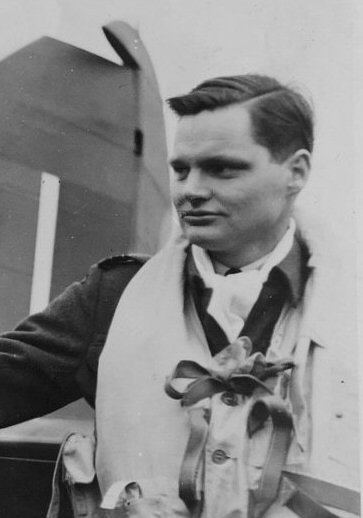
Acting Squadron Leader Peter Wilson. CO 438 Sqn killed in action on 1 January 1945

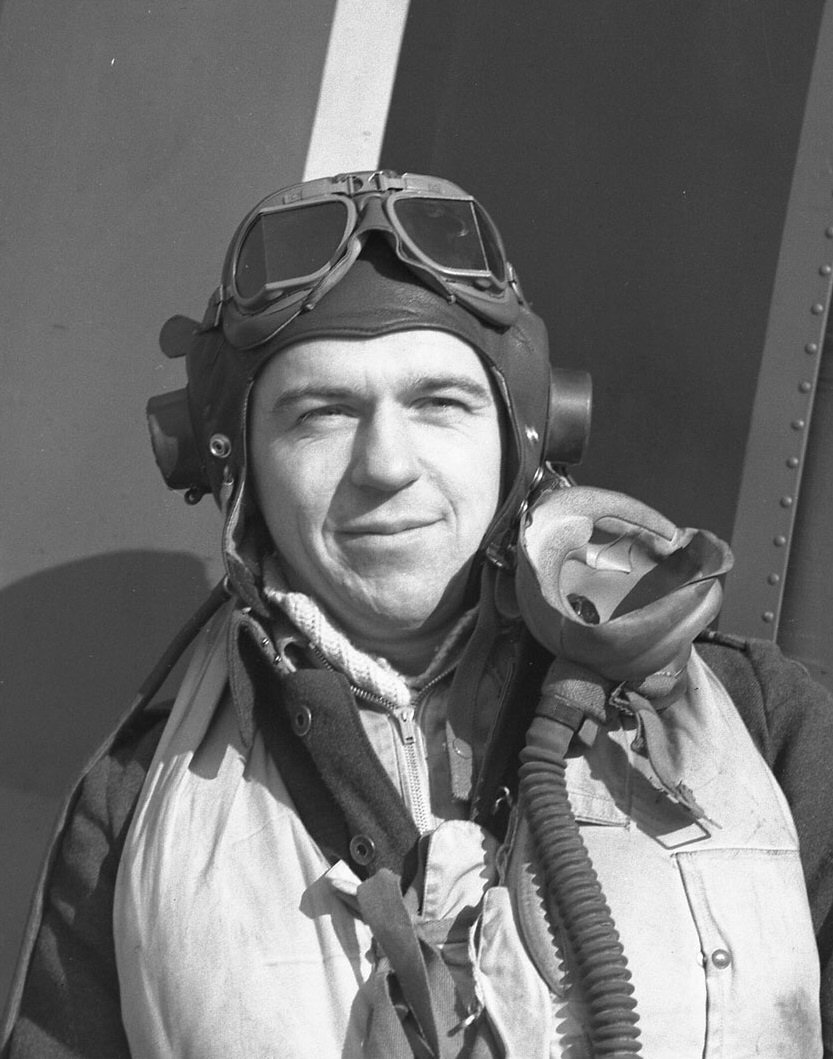
Squadron Leader James Easson Hogg, DFC. CO 438 Sqn killed in flying accident on 23 March 1945

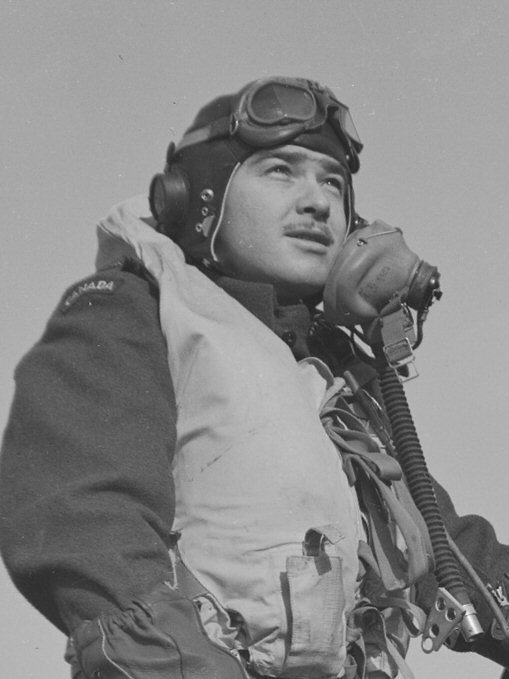
Squadron Leader Jack Rife Beirnes, DFC & bar. CO 438 Sqn killed in flying accident on 1 June 1945

- Squadron Leader Marcel C. Dubuc (12 May 1936 - 31 August 1939)
- Squadron Leader Adelard Raymond, C.B.E. (1 September 1939 - 29 July 1940)
- Flight Lieutenant Guy Vadboncoeur (30 July 1940 - 27 September 1940)
- Flight Lieutenant Eric Walter Beardmore (13 December 1940 - 4 April 1941)
- Wing Commander Ernest Archibald McNab O.B.E., D.F.C. (5 April 1941 - 22 July 1941)
- Squadron Leader Hartland de Montarville Molson, O.C., O.B.E., Q.C. (23 July 1941 - 14 June 1942)
- Squadron Leader Arthur McLeod Yuile (15 June 1942 - 27 February 1943)
- Squadron Leader Frank George Grant, D.S.O., D.F.C., Croix de Guerre (France), Airman's Cross (Netherlands) (28 February 1943 - 28 July 1944)
- Squadron Leader Jack Rife Beirnes, D.F.C. & Bar (29 July 1944 - 13 October 1944)
- Squadron Leader Ross Frederick Reid, D.F.C. (14 October 1944 - 30 December 1944)
- Acting Squadron Leader Peter Wilson (31 December 1944– KIA 1 January 1945)
- Squadron Leader Ross Frederick Reid, D.F.C. (1 to 19 Janvier 1945)
- Squadron Leader James Easson Hogg, D.F.C. (20 Janvier 1945 - KIA 23 March 1945)
- Flight Lieutenant Robert Edward Spooner, D.F.C. (23 March 1945 - 5 April 1945)
- Squadron Leader Jack Rife Beirnes, D.F.C. & Bar (6 April 1945– KIA 1 June 1945)
- Squadron Leader Paul Bissky (4 June 1945 - 26 August 1945)
- Wing Commander Claude Hebert, D.F.C. (15 April 1946 - 14 May 1950)
- Wing Commander Andre Rene Morrissette, A.F.C. (15 May 1950 - 14 February 1952)
- Wing Commander Guy Valois (15 February 1952 - 14 February 1955)
- Wing Commander Al Gauthier, C.D. (15 February 1955 - 14 November 1960)
- Wing Commander Laurent Gagne, C.D. (15 November 1960 - 31 October 1963)
- Wing Commander James Fischer, C.D. (1 November 1963 - 30 August 1967)
- Wing Commander Al Gamble, C.D. (31 August 1967 - 31 January 1968)
- Lieutenant Colonel John Perodeau, C.D. (1968–1973)
- Lieutenant Colonel Herb Laviolette, C.D. (1973–1974)
- Lieutenant Colonel Gerry McDougall, C.D. (1974–1977)
- Lieutenant Colonel Peter Carver, C.D. (1977–1979)
- Lieutenant Colonel Jean Cadorel, C.D. (1979 - 6 December 1981)
- Lieutenant Colonel Ed McKeogh, C.D. (6 December 1981 - 1 October 1983)
- Lieutenant Colonel Pierre Beauchamp, C.D. (1 October 1983 - 19 January 1986)
- Lieutenant Colonel John Guimond, C.D. (19 January 1986 - 31 March 1990)
- Lieutenant Colonel Henri Cardinal, C.D. (31 March 1990 - 13 June 1993)
- Lieutenant Colonel Gilles Trepanier, C.D. (13 June 1993 - 23 April 1994)
- Major Daniel Poirier, C.D. (3 April 1994 - 22 June 1996)
- Lieutenant Colonel Jean-Marc Hivon, C.D. (22 June 1996 - 20 March 1999)
- Lieutenant Colonel Jean Egan, C.D. (20 March 1999 - 18 August 2001)
- Lieutenant Colonel Michel Desgroseillers, C.D. (18 August 2001 - 27 August 2005)
- Lieutenant Colonel Luc Martineau, C.D. (27 August 2005 - 14 August 2010)
- Lieutenant Colonel Rene Therrien, C.D. (14 August 2010 - 15 June 2012)
- Lieutenant Colonel Pierre Barma, C.D. (15 June 2012 - 27 June 2014)
- Lieutenant Colonel Gilbert L. McCauley, MSM, C.D. (27 June 2014 - 23 June 2016)
- Lieutenant Colonel Martin Pesant, C.D. (23 June 2016 – 24 May 2018)
- Lieutenant Colonel Martin Houle, C.D., (24 May 2018 to 7 July 2020)
- Lieutenant Colonel Stéphane St-Onge, C.D., (7 July 2020 to 29 June 2023)
- Lieutenant Colonel Dominique Bertrand, C.D., (29 June 2023 to 4 July 2025)
- Lieutenant Colonel Guillaume Mallet, C.D., (4 July 2025 to present)

== Squadron aircraft ==
- de Havilland DH.60 Moth (May 1936 - September 1939)
- Blackburn Shark (October 1939–September 1940)
- Armstrong Whitworth Atlas (October 1939–September 1940)
- Westland Lysander (October 1939–September 1940)
- Westland Wapiti (October 1939-January 1940)
- Grumman Goblin (December 1940–December 1941)
- Curtiss Kittyhawk Mk.I (October 1941–October 1943)
- Hawker Sea Hurricane (November 1941-April 1942)
- Hawker Hurricane (November 1943–March 1944)
- Hawker Typhoon Mk.IB (January 1944–August 1945)
- North American Harvard (November 1941-October 1943 and November 1946–March 1948)
- de Havilland Vampire (April 1948–September 1954)
- Canadair CT-133 Silver Star (November 1954–September 1958)
- Canadair Sabre (October 1956–November 1958)
- Beechcraft Expeditor (November 1958–March 1964)
- CSR-123 Otter (September 1960 – 1981)
- CH-136 Kiowa (1981–1995)
- CH-146 Griffon (1995 to present)
- Sagem CU-161 Sperwer (2002–2009)

== See also ==
- Royal Canadian Air Force
- History of the Royal Canadian Air Force
- List of Royal Canadian Air Force squadrons
- Military history of Canada
