= No. 22 Sector RAF =

No. 22 (Fighter) Sector RAF 22nd Army Wing RFC No. 22 Wing Servicing Wing RAF No. 22 (RCAF) (Fighter) Wing RAF
- Active: 1916-19; 1940; 1944
- Country: United Kingdom
- Branch: Royal Flying Corps; Royal Air Force
- Type: Sector; Previously Wing

No. 22 Sector RAF is a former Royal Air Force Sector that was operational during both the First and the Second World Wars.

== First World War ==
22nd Army Wing RFC was formed on 14 September 1916 within 5th Brigade at Vert Galant, moving to Bertangles, Toutencourt, Houtkerque, La Lovie, St. Andre-Aux-Bosi, Proyart, Villers-Carbonnel, Flez, Roye, Tutencourt, Vaux-En-Amienois, Honnechy, Reumont, Assogne & Chateau Otrogue. It was redesignated to 9th Wing on 20 May 1919.

It controlled multiple squadrons including: 18, 19, 20, 23, 24, 28, 29, 32, 41, 46, 48, 49, 54, 57, 65, 70, 80, 84, 85, 92, 101, 201, 205, 208, 209, 211, 3 RNAS, 8 RNAS, 10 RNAS, 2nd AFC & 17th Aero.

== Second World War ==
No. 22 Wing Servicing Wing RAF was active until 1 August 1940 at RAF Aldergrove where it was disbanded during December 1941.

No. 22 (RCAF) (Fighter) Wing RAF was formed during January 1944 at RAF Ayr within No. 83 Group RAF controlling:

- No. 121 Airfield Headquarters RAF (from 16 April 1944)
- No. 124 Airfield Headquarters RAF (from 16 April 1944)
- No. 143 Airfield Headquarters RAF
- No. 144 Airfield Headquarters RAF (14 February 1944 to 16 April 1944)

The wing moved to RAF Digby on 21 February 1944, then to RAF Hurn on 17 March 1944. It moved to RAF Westhampnett on 26 March 1944 then returned to Hurn on 16 April 1944 and was disbanded on 12 May 1944.

No. 22 (Fighter) Sector RAF was formed on 12 May 1944 at RAF Hurn controlling:

- No. 121 (Rocket Projectile) Wing RAF
- No. 124 (Rocket Projectile) Wing RAF
- No. 143 (RCAF) (Fighter) Wing RAF

The sector moved to B.5 Le Fresnoy on 16 June 1944 and was disbanded still at Le Fresnoy on 12 July 1944.

== See also ==
- List of wings of the Royal Air Force
