= Jack Rife Beirnes =

Canadian Air Force officer (1914–1945)

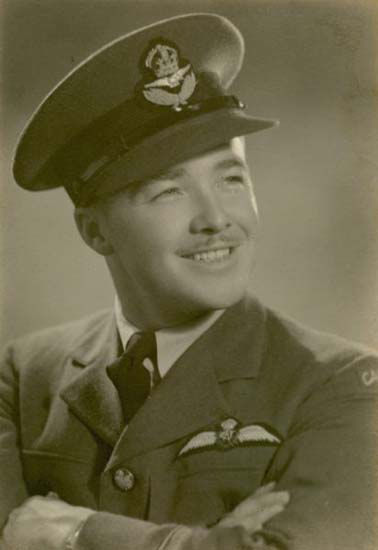
- Born: 24 November 1914; Birtle, Manitoba, Canada
- Died: 1 June 1945 (aged 30); Sønderborg, Denmark
- Burial place: Aabenraa, Denmark
- Military career
- Allegiance: Canada
- Branch: Royal Canadian Air Force
- Service years: 1940 - 1945
- Rank: Squadron Leader
- Service number: C13458
- Units: 1 ANS RCAF; 2 ANS RCAF; 118 Sqn RCAF
- Commands: 438 Sqn RCAF
- Conflicts: Second World War; Battle of the Atlantic; West Coast Defense; European Air War
- Awards: Distinguished Flying Cross & Bar

Jack Rife Beirnes (24 November 1914 – 1 June 1945) was a Royal Canadian Air Force squadron leader who flew Kittyhawk fighters on home defense in Canada and then commanded a squadron of Hawker Typhoons over Europe during the Second World War. He was awarded the Distinguished Flying Cross and Bar for his successes while serving with No. 438 Squadron RCAF. He lost his life in a flying accident at the end of his third combat tour.

== Early life ==
Beirnes was born in Birtle, Manitoba, but grew up in Tofield, Alberta, where his father ran a drugstore. He was an Army Cadet in Tofield from 4 September 1927 to 22 November 1933 and liked to build model aircraft.

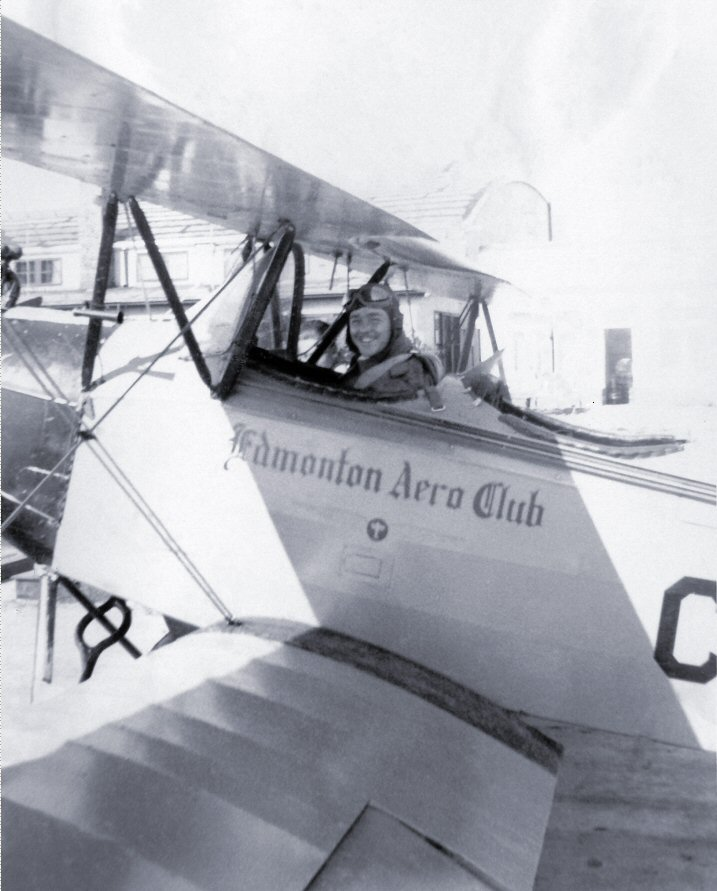
Beirnes in the cockpit of a Fleet Fawn at the Edmonton Aero Club

Pre-war, he was employed as a pipefitter, farm labourer, and for 13 years was a clerk in the Rexall drug store (his father was a pharmacist). In 1934 he applied to the RCAF but was rejected. The assessment read, "he does not possess the nervous and physical stability necessary to withstand the stress of flying duties". Fascinated by flying, he drove a cab in Edmonton to pay for his flying lessons.

He obtained his private pilot's license at the Edmonton and Northern Alberta Aero Club in June 1936, hoping to apply for a Short Service Commission in the Royal Air Force, having visited the UK in 1935 to enlist. At the time of his 1936 application, he had 13.25 hours dual, 5.10 hours solo. He once again tried to enlist in the RAF in 1937 without success.

== Home service ==
=== Enlistment and training ===
Beirnes enlisted in the RCAF on 13 April 1940 as a pilot. He did his basic training at No. 1 Initial Training School in Toronto from 29 April to 24 May 1940. Already a qualified civilian pilot with 35 solo hours and 14 dual hours, he was directly sent to No.1 Service Flying Training School at Camp Borden, Ontario. There he flew both the Harvard and Yale advanced trainers. This was followed by a multi-engine course at RCAF station Trenton, Ontario on the Avro Anson. He received his RCAF pilots wings on 30 November 1940 and was promoted to Sergeant.

=== Staff pilot duties ===
Like many other older experienced civilian pilots, Beirnes was initially used as a staff pilot in a RCAF school. He was first transferred on 1 December 1940 to No.1 Air Navigation School at Rivers, Manitoba as a staff pilot flying the twin engine Anson. He was transferred to No.2 Air Navigation School at Pennfield Ridge, New Brunswick on 12 August 1941. There he kept flying the Anson for navigator trainees.

=== 1st tour - 118 Squadron ===
Beirnes was promoted to warrant officer 2nd class on 1 December 1941 and transferred to 118 (fighter) Squadron at Dartmouth, Nova Scotia, on 16 December 1941. 118 Squadron flew the Kittyhawk in defense of the east coast and approaches to Halifax. In January 1942, Jack received word that his brother Donald, a Flight Sergeant pilot in the RCAF, was lost on operations overseas. He was serving with a British squadron in the Mediterranean at the time. His 82 Squadron Bristol Blenheim disappeared while in transit between Malta and Egypt on 4 January. Beirnes was commissioned to the rank of pilot officer on 1 June 1942.

The squadron was ordered to Alaska in June 1942 to defend against the Japanese in the Aleutian Islands. 118 Squadron Kittyhawks, along with 4 Lockheed Hudson transports carrying support personnel left Dartmouth on 6 June 1942 for an epic 4,000-mile flight to Annette Island, Alaska. The squadron arrived on station on the 25th and began armed coastal patrols. Beirnes was married to Gwendolyn (née Firth), 27, of Edmonton and together they had a son, Donald Gordon Beirnes, born on August 5, 1944. Jack and Gwendolyn were married in Edmonton on September 12, 1942. His experience and leadership were again recognised on 12 October when he was promoted to Flying officer. The squadron moved to Sea Island, British Columbia on 20 August 1943 and would remain there until ordered overseas. Beirnes was promoted to Flight lieutenant on 1 October 1943 and made a flight commander. 118 Squadron received orders for overseas and left Sea Island. Leaving their Kittyhawks behind, the 142 strong squadron crossed Canada by rail embarking on 2 November 1943 in Halifax for the sea voyage to the United Kingdom.

== Overseas service ==
=== Training in the UK ===
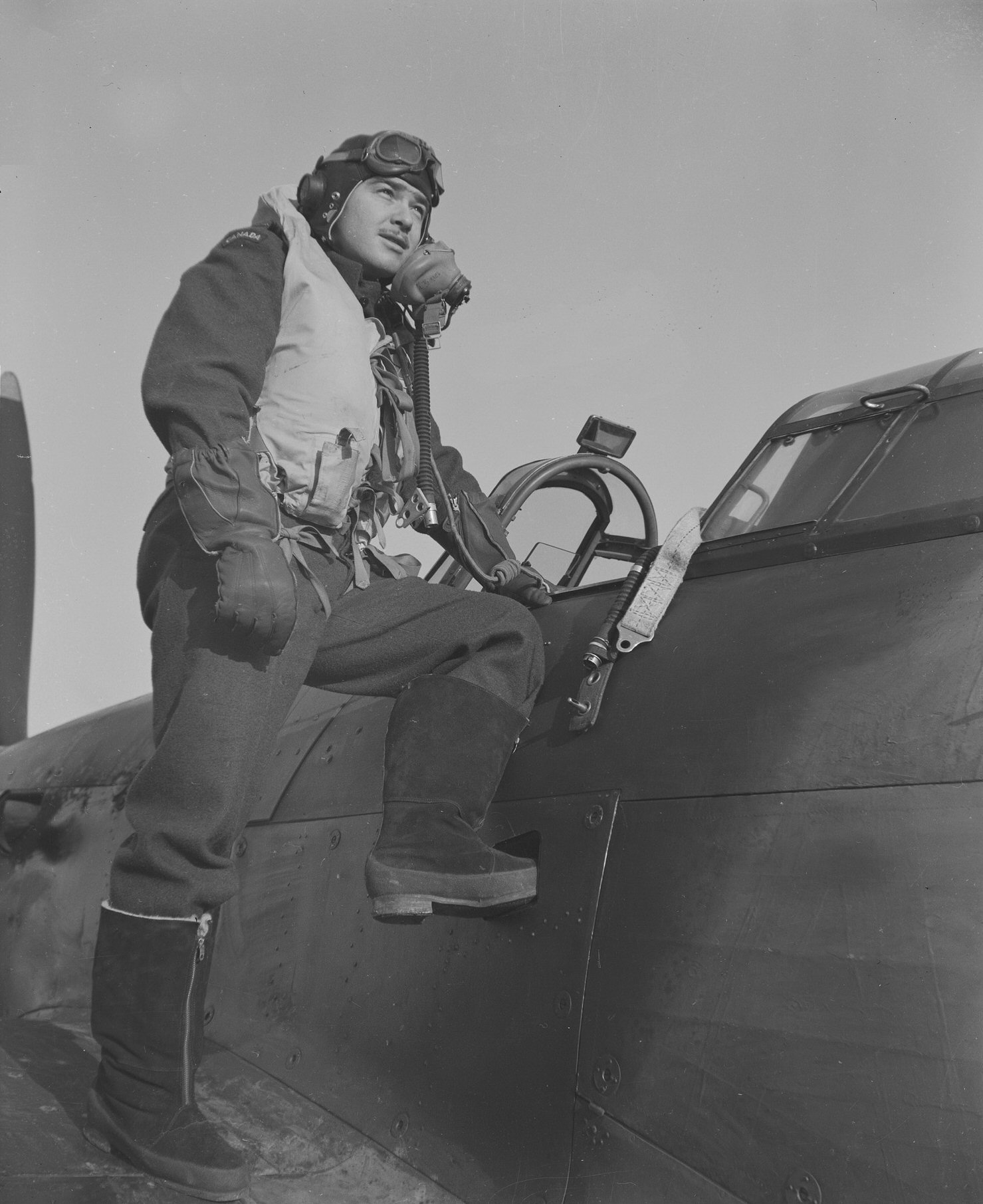
Beirnes on his Hawker Hurricane at Ayr, January 1944

F/L Beirnes disembarked in the UK on 9 November 1943 with the rest of the squadron. Once processed through the RCAF No. 3 Personnel Reception Center, they were initially sent to RAF Station Digby. There, 118 Sqn was renumbered 438 to avoid confusion with other British Empire units also operating from the United Kingdom. RCAF squadrons were allocated the 400 to 449 block of numbers. The squadron moved to RAF Station Ayr in Scotland on 10 January 1944, learning to fly the Hawker Hurricane easing their upcoming conversion to the powerful Hawker Typhoon. New factory fresh Typhoons soon began arriving and training on the new aircraft progressed well enough for operational missions to begin as early as mid March.

=== 2nd tour - 438 Squadron ===
Beirnes led his flight down to RAF Hurn in March when the squadron moved south in preparation for its first cross-Channel combat missions. He was part of the very first squadron operational mission on 20 March carrying out a fighter sweep over Guernsey. Weather permitting, the now almost daily missions soon turned to bombing pre invasion targets in France. On June 6, Beirnes flew two missions in support of the D-Day landings. The first saw him airborne by 0655 ahead of his flight to dive bomb an enemy strong point near Thierville, the second with take off at 1715 where he led the squadron this time for a sweep of enemy forces south of Caen. The Typhoon fighter-bombers closely supporting the ground forces, were among the first air force units to operate from advanced airfields on the continent in order to offer a timely response. 438 Squadron moved to advanced airfield B9 Lantheuil in France on 27 June, well within the range of enemy artillery fire.

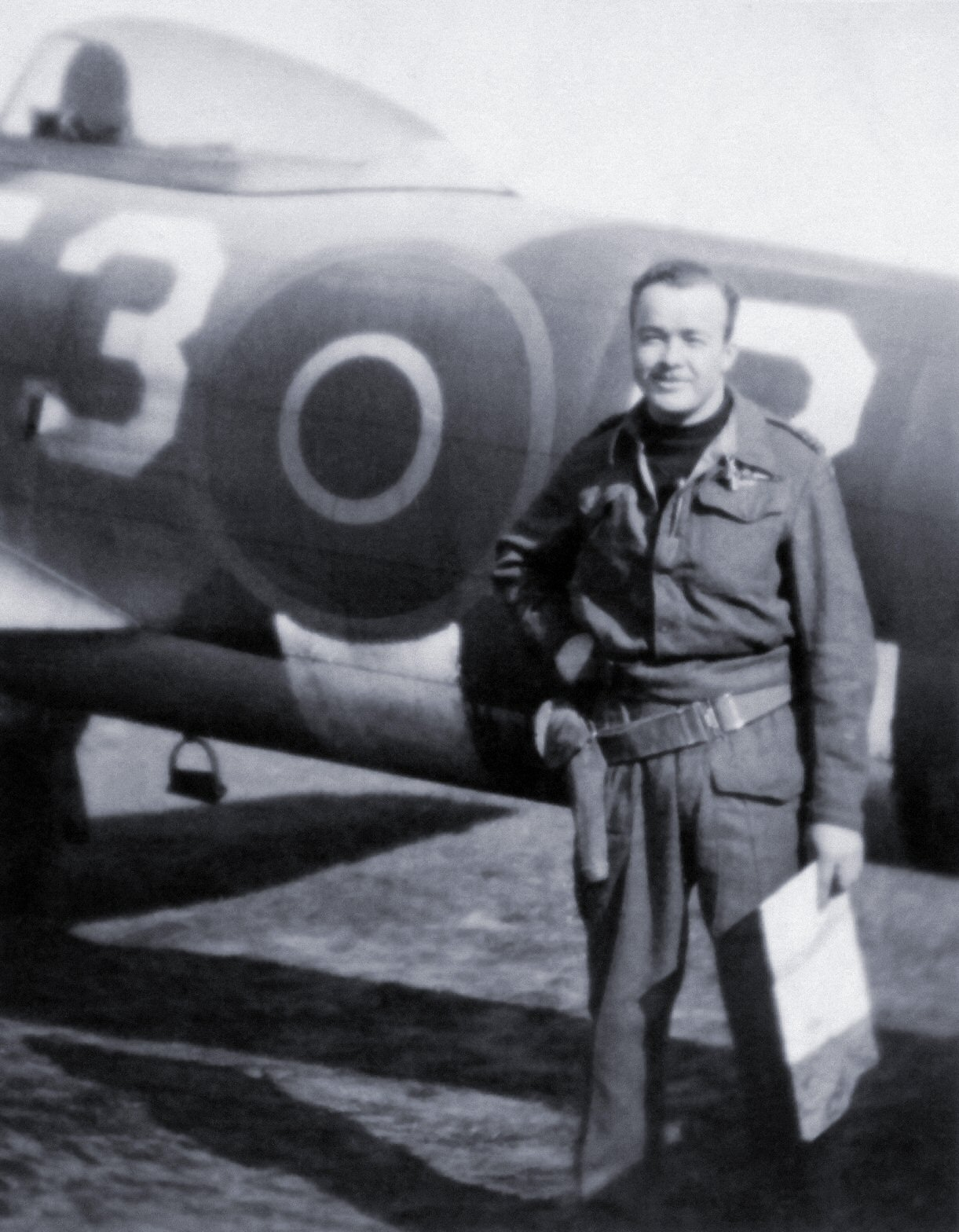
Squadron Leader Beirnes, CO of 438 Squadron, with his Typhoon F3-B

It is while based there, on 29 July 1944, that Beirnes was promoted to squadron leader and given command of the squadron. He replaced the newly promoted Wing Commander Frank George Grant D.S.O., D.F.C., who took over the entire Canadian 143 Wing to which 438 was subordinate with 439 and 440 squadrons.

Historian Hugh A. Halliday in his book Typhoon and Tempest describes a very successful day for Beirnes in 1944:

September 10 produced four missions. At 1520 hours S/L Beirnes led nine Typhoons to the area of Turnhout-Venlo-Eindhoven to strafe four trains, each with 10-20 cars. In each case the locomotive was destroyed. The flight landed at 1630 and was off again at 1930, this time with 500-pounders to blast shipping at Hoedekenskerke. All bombs were on target, hitting either ships or docks. One ship, apparently carrying ammunition, blew up in spectacular fashion and another vessel was left smoking.

Beirnes led the squadron on operations ever deeper within the continent including missions in support of the ill-fated Operation Market Garden near Arnhem. This earned the squadron an additional battle honour. The last flight of his second combat tour was on 9 October. On 13 October, he relinquished command of 438 Squadron to S/L Ross Reid D.F.C.

For his leadership in combat, Beirnes was awarded the Distinguished Flying Cross on 24 October 1944. His citation, published in the London Gazette, read:

In July 1944 Squadron Leader Beirnes led a formation of aircraft in an attack on a vital railway bridge over the river Orne just south of Caen. In spite of intense anti-aircraft fire and much low cloud the attack was pressed home and the bridge destroyed. In this well executed operation, Squadron Leader Beirnes displayed a high degree of skill, courage and leadership. In August, 1944, this officer again proved his skill when leading a formation in an attack against enemy mortar positions near the Forest of Grimbosq.

=== Rest in Canada ===
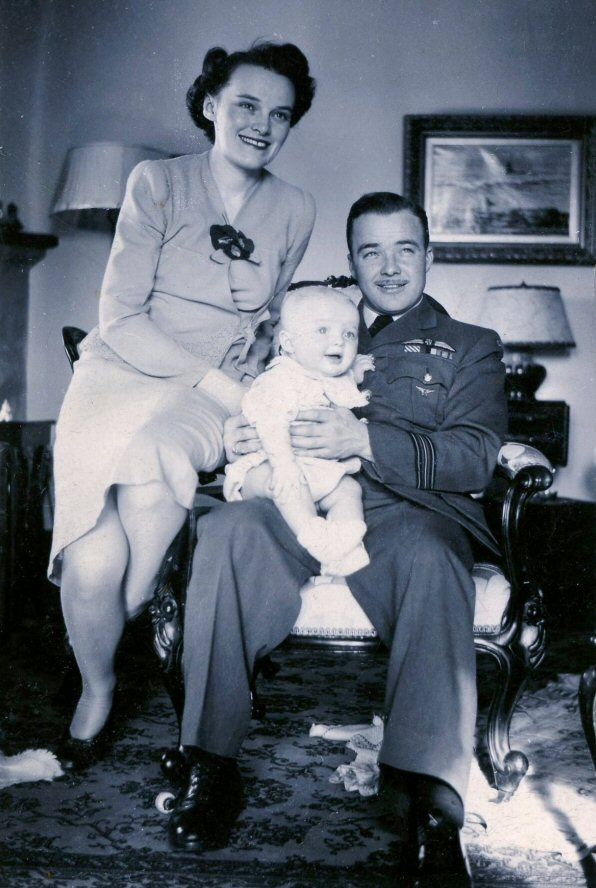
Beirnes with his wife Gwendolyn and baby son Gordon

Beirnes was repatriated to Canada on 15 November 1944 for a rest. He was transferred to No.8 (aircraft) Repair Depot in Winnipeg in charge of test pilots. He was only there for a short time, going on 30 days leave in mid-February. There he saw his baby son Gordon, born in August 1944, for the first time. These short few months in Winnipeg would unfortunately be the only time the family would be together. Events at the squadron back in Europe would greatly influence his future. The tour of his replacement at the head of 438 Squadron, S/L Reid, expired on 31 December, and he relinquished command to Flight Lieutenant Peter Wilson, who was killed the very next day, 1 January 1945, during an enemy dawn air raid on their airfield. Wilson was succeeded by the newly promoted S/L James Easson Hogg D.F.C., transferred from 440 Squadron on 20 January. Unfortunately, S/L Hogg lost his life in a training accident on 23 March. Beirnes had already volunteered to return to Europe and left Canada on 11 March, arriving in the UK on 18 March.

=== 3rd tour - 438 Squadron ===
Back in the UK, Beirnes was initially sent to No. 83 Group Support Unit to train pilots on the Typhoon and ferry replacement aircraft to operational units. But recent events meant that on 6 April, S/L Jack Beirnes once again took command of 438 Squadron. Barely a month from the end of hostilities in Europe, the danger was still quite real in the form of heavy anti-aircraft fire near most targets. The end of the war in Europe saw the Wildcats of 438 Squadron based in Germany proper at B150 Celle. They moved to B166 Flensburg on 29 May. A large aerial display was planned for the people of Copenhagen, Denmark, and the entire RCAF 143 Wing would perform a flyover with all of their Typhoons. It was during a practice for this event that Beirnes would lose his life.

Beirnes was killed on 1 June when he crash-landed after his engine failed. His wingman F/L Ronald Claire Getty wrote in his report:

I noticed a black puff come from the engine and a second later the pilot S/L J.R. Beirnes called up and said his engine was cutting. He proceeded to a normal forced landing. As he was turning into a field his starboard wing touched the ground the aircraft breaking up on impact.

He died of his injuries 10 minutes later. He was buried in the cemetery in Aabenraa, Denmark, with full military honours.

The award of a Bar to his DFC was posthumously announced in September 1945. The citation read:

Now on his third tour of operational duty, this officer has proved to be an outstanding squadron commander. In April 1945 Squadron Leader Beirnes led his squadron on a rail interdiction sortie which severely disrupted the enemy's lines of communication. On another occasion, he led an attack on a light cruiser. His squadron scored six hits despite heavy opposition from anti-aircraft fire. The cruiser was set ablaze and was seen to be listing to port. This officer had displayed coolness and courage throughout.

On six occasions, he flew three sorties in one day: 17 June, 24 June, 9 August and 18 August at the height of the Battle of Falaise, 30 September and 2 October 1944. Overseas, on 4 June 1944, S/L F.G. Grant described him as a "Particularly good flight commander on the ground and outstanding in the air. Confident and self-assured on operations". On 27 October 1944, Group Captain Paul Davoud D.S.O., O.B.E., D.F.C. wrote that he was "A fine organizer and a brilliant fighter-bomber leader whose judgement was outstanding".

== See also ==
- Royal Canadian Air Force
- History of the Royal Canadian Air Force
- List of Royal Canadian Air Force squadrons
- Military history of Canada

== Other sources ==
- The Dangerous Sky by Tom Coughlin, Ryerson Press Toronto, see pages 139–145.
- 438 Squadron archives
