= 439 Combat Support Squadron =

- 439^{e} Escadron de soutien au combat
- Active: 1942–1945; 1951–1963; 1964–present
- Country: Canada
- Branch: (Canada) Royal Canadian Air Force
- Role: Combat support
- Part of: 3 Wing Bagotville
- Garrison/HQ: Bagotville, Quebec
- Nicknames: Westmount (World War II), Sabre-Toothed Tiger
- Motto: Fangs of death
- Engagements: World War II; Gulf War
- Battle honours: Fortress Europe, 1944; France and Germany, 1944–1945; Normandy, 1944; Arnhem; Rhine; Gulf and Kuwait
- Website: rcaf-arc.forces.gc.ca/en/squadron/439-squadron.page

Insignia
- Squadron Code: 5V (1944–1945)

Aircraft flown
- Fighter: Hawker Hurricane, Hawker Typhoon, F-86 Sabre, CF-104 Starfighter, CF-18 Hornet
- Transport: CH-146 Griffon

439 Combat Support Squadron (French: 439^{e} Escadron de soutien au combat) is a squadron of the Royal Canadian Air Force, based in Bagotville, Quebec.

It was formed as No. 123 (Army Co-operation) Squadron in early 1942 for army training operations in eastern Canada during World War II, being renumbered No. 439 Squadron RCAF in late 1943 when it transferred to England. The squadron briefly flew the Hawker Hurricane before receiving the Hawker Typhoon, flying ground attack missions with the Second Tactical Air Force in support of Allied advances in northwestern Europe from mid-1944 to the end of the war in May 1945.

Disbanded shortly after the end of the Second World War, the squadron was reformed in 1951, operating the Canadair Sabre from England and France until 1963, when it was disbanded. It was quickly reformed as 439 Reconnaissance/Attack Squadron, operating the CF-104 Starfighter. Moved to Germany in 1967, it underwent several redesignations before assuming a ground attack mission at CFB Baden–Soellingen as 439 Tactical Fighter Squadron. After converting to the CF-18 Hornet in the mid-1980s, the squadron participated in the Gulf War. It assumed its current title in 1993, operating the Bell CH-146 Griffon helicopter.

== World War II ==
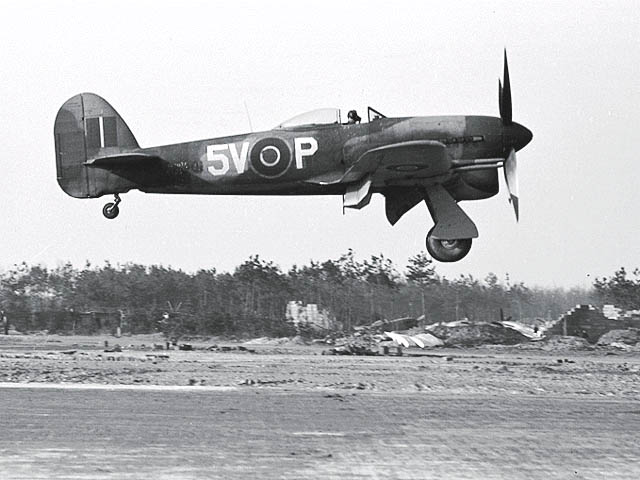
A Typhoon IB of the squadron landing at Advanced Landing Ground Goch, 1945

No. 123 (Army Co-operation) Squadron was formed on 15 January 1942 during World War II from the School of Army Co-Operation. The latter had been formed on 22 October 1941 at Rockcliffe, Ontario under the command of Squadron Leader W.W.S. Ross, who continued in that position for No. 123 Squadron. The school was administratively part of No. 3 Training Command and operationally under RCAF Headquarters. Equipped with North American Harvard Mark IIB trainers and Westland Lysander Mark II army co-operation aircraft, the squadron trained with the 4th and 7th Canadian Divisions in close support and reconnaissance. It relocated to Debert, Nova Scotia, on 16 February 1942, joining Eastern Air Command. A detachment of three Lysanders was stationed at Sydney to patrol the harbour entrance there between 8 October and 27 January 1943, flying 98 sorties and 194 flying hours.

It transferred to Wellingore, England on 31 December 1943 and was renumbered No. 439 (Fighter-Bomber Squadron) on New Year's Day 1944. Though the squadron was slated to become a fighter-bomber unit operating the Hawker Typhoon Mark IB, it initially operated the Hawker Hurricane Mark IV in addition to the Typhoon until April 1944.

No. 439 Squadron relocated to Ayr on 8 January and Hurn on 18 March. From the latter, on 27 March, it flew its first ground attack mission against V-1 flying bomb launch sites as part of No. 143 Wing RCAF. The squadron also attacked German bases and communications targets in preparation for the Normandy landings of 6 June. During this period, it moved to Funtington on 2 April, back to Hurn on 19 April, to Hutton Cranswick on 11 May, and back to Hurn on 20 May. Following the Normandy landings, the squadron was moved to Advanced Landing Ground Lantheuil (B-9) on 27 June to provide close air support for the advancing Allied forces.

The squadron moved forward to Advanced Landing Ground St-André de l'Eure (B-24) on 31 August, Amiens – Glisy (B-48) on 3 September to keep pace with the advance, ultimately moving to Melsbroek (B-58) in Belgium on 6 September and Eindhoven in The Netherlands on 25 September. 439 Squadron remained there for the northern hemisphere winter and during the last months of the war attacked communications and shipping in sweeps over Germany. In the final weeks of the war the squadron moved yet again to Goch (B-100) in Germany on 30 March 1945, to RAF Warmwell on 3 April, and to Hustedt (B-150) on 23 April. Its final base in Germany was Flensburg (B-166), where it was located from 29 May to its disbandment on 26 August.

== Postwar ==
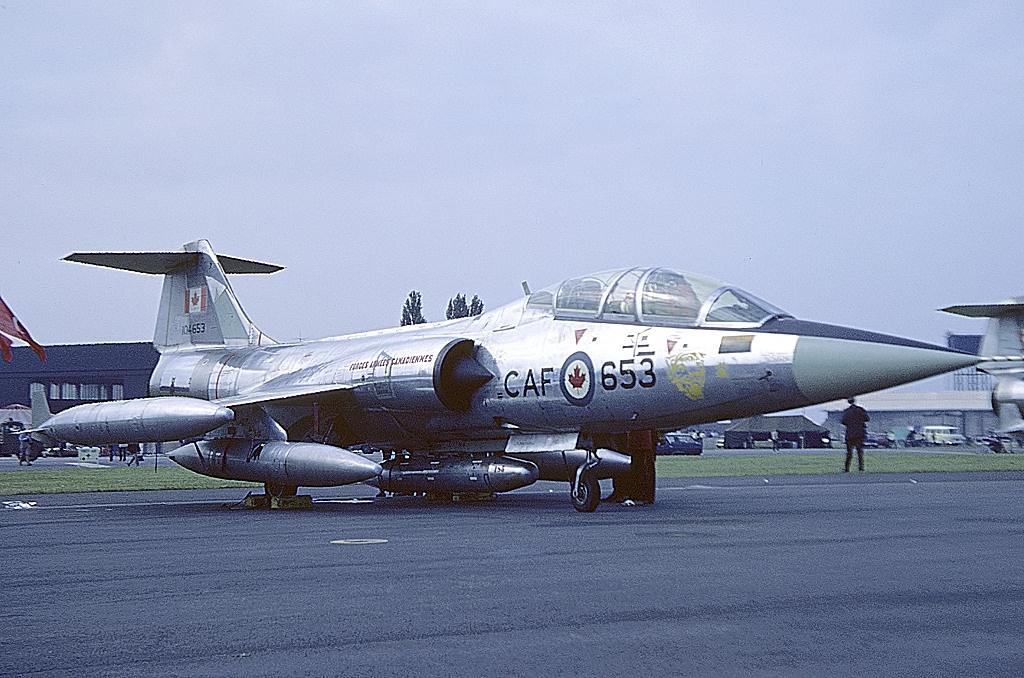
A CF-104D Starfighter Mark 2 at Baden–Soellingen, 1972

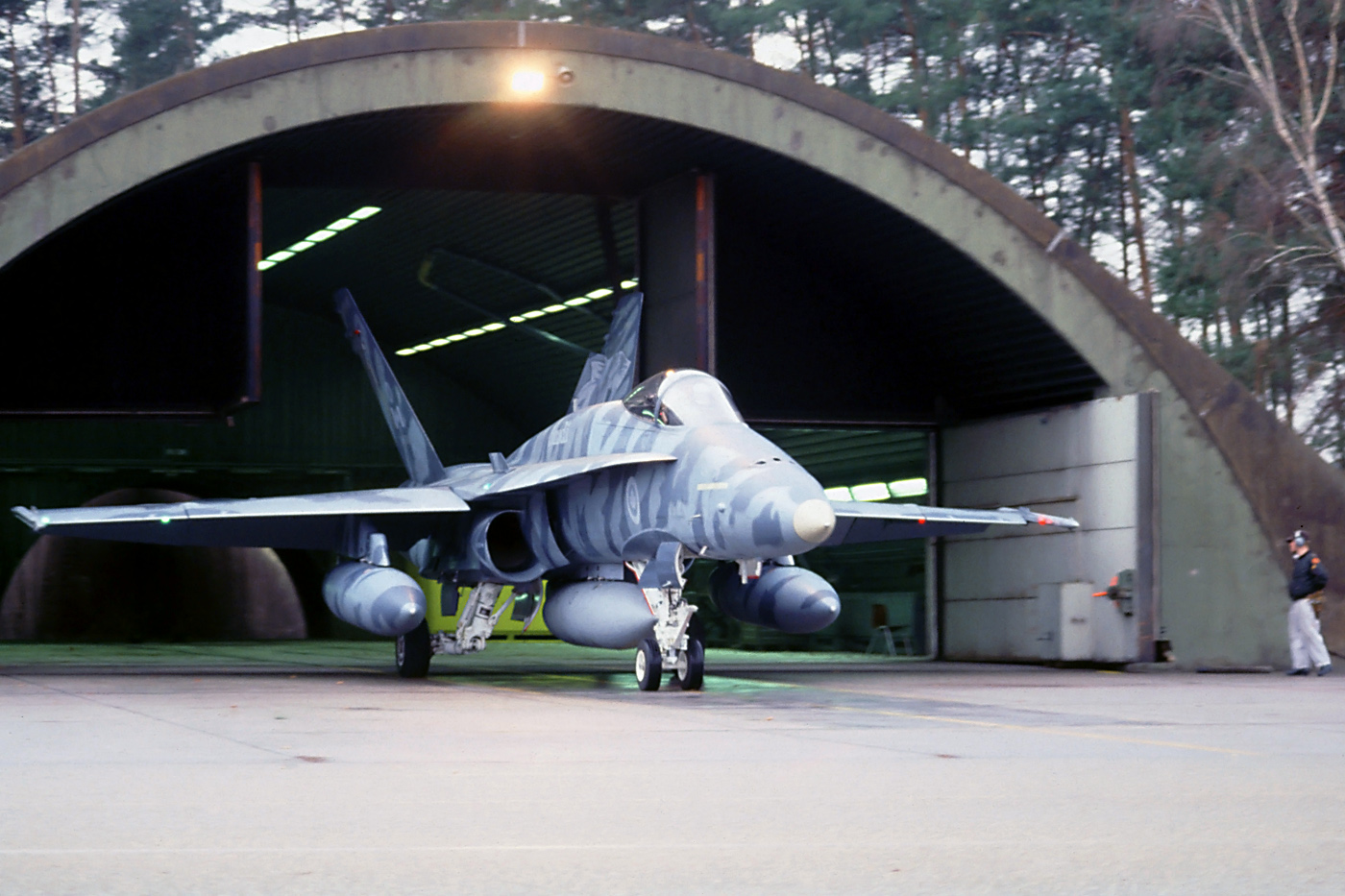
A CF-18A of the squadron taxiing out of its shelter during the departure from Baden–Soellingen, 1993

They re-formed at Royal Canadian Air Force (RCAF) Station Uplands (CFB Uplands) on September 1, 1951, and went to 1 Wing North Luffenham on May 4, 1952. They then moved to 1 Wing Marville, France, on April 1, 1955. The squadron was equipped with the F-86 Sabre. They were deactivated between November 30, 1963, and February 28, 1964, and reactivated on March 1, 1964, as 439 Strike/Attack Squadron, equipped with CF-104 Starfighters. They moved with 1 Wing to Lahr, Germany, on April 1, 1967, then to CFB Baden-Soellingen, Germany, in 1971 as 439 Tactical Fighter Squadron. The squadron disbanded in November 1984 and re-formed in November 1985 with the CF-18. During the Gulf War, the squadron fought as part of the coalition of the Gulf War. They were disbanded at Baden-Soellingen on 15 May 1993 and reactivated shortly after at 3 Wing Bagotville as 439 Combat Support Squadron; the redesignation was officially carried out on 1 April. The squadron is now equipped with the CH-146 Griffon.

== Casualties, decorations, and battle honours ==
As No. 123 Squadron, it suffered no casualties and had one of its members awarded the British Empire Medal.

The following battle honours are borne on the colours of the squadron:

- Second World War: Fortress Europe, 1944; France and Germany, 1944–1945; Normandy, 1944; Arnhem; Rhine
- Gulf War: Gulf and Kuwait
