= No. 83 Expeditionary Air Group =

Expeditionary group of the Royal Air Force

- Group badge
- Active: 1943–1946; 1952–1958; 2006–present
- Country: United Kingdom
- Branch: Royal Air Force
- Type: Group headquarters
- Role: Middle East air operations
- Part of: No. 11 Group
- Headquarters: Al Udeid Air Base, Qatar
- Mottos: A Deux Plus Forts (French for 'Two heads are better than one')

Commanders
- Commanding Officer: Group Captain Bishop

No. 83 Expeditionary Air Group is a group within the Royal Air Force, currently based at Al Udeid Air Base in Qatar.

Originally formed in 1943, during the Second World War it formed part of the 2nd Tactical Air Force (2TAF) and was known as No. 83 (Composite) Group. It provided support to Allied forces during the liberation of Europe. After being disbanded in 1946 it was re-established as No. 83 Group in 1952 to lead the 2TAF's units in Germany, until it disbanded again in 1958.

On 1 April 2006 it was reformed as No. 83 Expeditionary Air Group Headquarters, to lead UK air operations in the Middle East. Activities include Operations Kipion (the UK's maritime presence in the Middle East) and Operation Shader (the UK's part of the military intervention against the Islamic State of Iraq and the Levant (ISIL)).

== History ==
=== No. 83 (Composite) Group ===
No. 83 (Composite) Group was formed on 1 April 1943 within the Second Tactical Air Force of the Royal Air Force. By the eve of the D-Day landings in June 1944, No. 83 Group had grown to a strength of twenty-nine fighter, ground-attack and reconnaissance squadrons and four artillery observation squadrons, grouped into ten wings.

At the time of D-Day, the group consisted of:

- No. 39 Reconnaissance Wing RCAF
- Hawker Typhoon fighter-bombers
  - No. 121 (Rocket Projectile) Wing RAF at Holmsley South
  - No. 124 (Rocket Projectile) Wing RAF at Hurn
  - No. 129 (Fighter Bomber) Wing RAF at Westhampnett
  - No. 143 (RCAF) (Fighter) Wing RAF at Hurn
- Supermarine Spitfire fighters
  - No. 125 (Fighter) Wing RAF at Ford
  - No. 126 (RCAF) (Fighter) Wing RAF at Tangmere
  - No. 127 (RCAF) (Fighter) Wing RAF at Tangmere
  - No. 144 (RCAF) (Fighter) Wing RAF at Ford
- North American Mustangs
  - No. 122 (Rocket Projectile) Wing RAF at Funtington

Other group units can be seen at and included No. 83 Group Support Unit RAF, which was located at RAF Redhill on D-Day.

The Group headquarters was at Eindhoven from 1 October 1944 to 10 April 1945. The group was absorbed into No. 84 Group RAF on 21 April 1946.

=== No. 83 Group ===
No. 83 Group was re-formed on 9 July 1952 within the Second Tactical Air Force in Germany to control its southern area. By 1956, the group controlled five wings with a total of fourteen squadrons equipped with Hawker Hunter day fighters, de Havilland Venom fighter-bombers, Supermarine Swift fighter-reconnaissance aircraft, Gloster Meteor night-fighters and English Electric Canberra interdiction and reconnaissance aircraft. It was disbanded again on 16 June 1958.

During April 1953 the group controlled:

- RAF Wahn
  - No. 83 Group Communications Flight
  - No. 68 Squadron RAF - Meteor
  - No. 87 Squadron RAF - Meteor
- RAF Celle
  - No. 16 Squadron RAF - Vampire & Meteor
  - No. 94 Squadron RAF - Vampire & Meteor
  - No. 145 Squadron RAF - Vampire & Meteor
- RAF Wildenrath
  - No. 3 Squadron RAF - Vampire & Meteor
  - No. 67 Squadron RAF - Vampire & Meteor
  - No. 71 Squadron RAF - Vampire & Meteor
  - Sabre Conversion Flight - Sabre

On 1 July 1956, No. 83 Group directed wings at RAF Bruggen, RAF Celle, RAF Geilenkirchen, RAF Wahn, and RAF Wildenrath.

== Current operations ==
No. 83 Group was re-formed on 1 April 2006 from the UK Air Component Headquarters in the Middle East. It comprised No. 901 Expeditionary Air Wing in the Middle East and Bahrain and No. 902 Expeditionary Air Wing at Seeb in Oman. Since that time it has controlled a varying number of Expeditionary Air Wings. No. 83 Group is based at Al Udeid Air Base in Qatar.

The Air Officer Commanding No. 83 Group was the Air Component Commander in the Middle East. They were responsible to the Permanent Joint Headquarters for the command and control of all RAF units engaged in Operations Kipion and Shader.

While in post, Air Commodore Nikki Thomas was "responsible for delivering UK operations, commanding personnel across the region and acting as the UK Senior Representative in the CENTCOM-led Combined Air Operations Centre (CAOC) [the partner augmentation to the U.S. 609th Air Operations Center] based in Qatar."

No. 83 Group is currently in charge of:

901 Expeditionary Air Wing

- Provides support to No. 83 EAG and home to Joint Force Communication and Information Systems (Middle East).

902 Expeditionary Air Wing

- RAFO Musannah.

903 Expeditionary Air Wing

- RAF Akrotiri - Eurofighter Typhoon FGR4, Airbus A400M Atlas and Airbus Voyager.

906 Expeditionary Air Wing

- Al Minhad Air Base.

== Commanders ==
=== 1943 to 1946 ===
- Air Vice Marshal W F Dickson, 4 April 1943 – 25 March 1944
- AVM H Broadhurst, 25 March 1944 – 1 September 1945
- AVM T C Traill, 9 September 1945 – 21 April 1946

=== 1952 to 1958 ===
- Air Commodore R B Lees, 8 September 1952 – 22 August 1955.
- AVM H A V Hogan, 22 August 1955 – 16 June 1958.

=== 2006 to present ===
- Air Commodore B M North, 1 April 2006 – 13 September 2006
- Air Commodore C A Bairsto, 13 September 2006 – 12 January 2007
- Air Commodore P Oborn, 12 January 2007 – 10 July 2007
- Air Commodore M J Harwood, 10 July 2007 – 16 August 2008
- Air Commodore A S Barmby, 16 August 2008 – 22 May 2009
- Air Commodore S D Atha, 22 May 2009 – 31 January 2010
- Air Commodore K B McCann, 31 January 2010 – 6 January 2011
- Air Commodore A D Stevenson, 6 January 2011 – 15 December 2011
- Air Commodore S D Forward, 15 December 2011 – 21 December 2012
- Air Commodore P J Beach, 21 December 2012 – 14 December 2013
- Air Commodore A Gillespie, 14 December 2013 – 1 December 2014
- Air Commodore M Sampson, 1 December 2014 – 23 October 2016
- Air Commodore John J Stringer, 23 October 2016 – 22 October 2017
- Air Commodore R J Dennis, 22 October 2017 – 21 October 2018
- Air Commodore Justin Reuter, 21 October 2018 – 20 October 2019
- Air Commodore Tim Jones, 20 October 2019 – September 2020
- Air Commodore Simon Strasdin, September 2020 – September 2021
- Air Commodore Mark J Farrell, September 2021 – September 2022
- Air Commodore Nikki Thomas (N S Thomas), September 2022 – In post November 2022. Appointed air attache Washington DC, September 2023.
- Group Captain Diggle, ? – November 2023
- Group Captain Bishop, November 2023 – (CO of 83 EAG and Deputy Air Component Commander, Middle East).

== See also ==
- List of Royal Air Force groups
