= No. 16 Wing RAF =

Defunct Wing of the Royal Air Force

No. 16 Wing RAF 16th (Home Defence) Wing RFC 16th Corps Wing RFC No. 16 (Mobile) Wing RAF
- Active: 1916; 1916-19; 1943-44; 1946
- Country: United Kingdom
- Branch: Royal Flying Corps; Royal Air Force
- Type: Wing

No. 16 Wing RAF is a former Royal Air Force wing that was operational during both the First and the Second World Wars.

== First World War ==
16th (Home Defence) Wing RFC was formed on 25 June 1916 at Adastral House, Victoria Embankment, London supporting:

- 33 Squadron RFC
- 36 Squadron RFC
- 38 Squadron RFC
- 39 Squadron RFC
- 50 Squadron RFC
- 51 Squadron RFC

Until 28 July 1916 when the wing became the Home Defence Wing.

The wing was reformed on 20 September 1916 as the 16th Corps Wing at Salonika under the Middle East Brigade with No. 17 Squadron RFC, No. 47 Squadron RFC and No. 17 Kite Balloon Squadron. The wing moved to Janes on 26 September 1918 then back to Salonika before moving to San Stefano on 5 July 1919 where the unit was disbanded on 14 November 1919.

== Second World War ==
No. 16 (Mobile) Wing RAF was formed on 5 July 1943 at RAF New Romney controlling:

- No. 121 Airfield Headquarters RAF
- No. 124 Airfield Headquarters RAF

Shortly afterwards on 18 August 1943 the wing moved to RAF Lydd, then to RAF Westhampnett on 9 October 1943 then finally to RAF Hurn on 1 April 1944. The wing was disbanded on 14 April 1944.

The wing was briefly reformed on 8 March 1946 at RAF Chatham but was disbanded on 3 June 1946.

== See also ==
- List of wings of the Royal Air Force
