= No. 121 Expeditionary Air Wing =

No. 121 Expeditionary Air Wing RAF Previous units: No. 121 (Rocket Projectile) Wing RAF No. 121 (Day Fighter) Wing RAF No. 121 Wing No. 121 Expeditionary Air Wing (Multi Role) RAF
- Active: 1 April 2006 - 1943-44; 1944-45; 1953-56; 1956-57; 1958-60
- Country: United Kingdom
- Branch: Royal Air Force
- Type: Expeditionary Air Wing
- Size: Wing
- Garrison/HQ: RAF Coningsby

Aircraft flown
- Fighter: Eurofighter Typhoon FGR.4

No. 121 Expeditionary Air Wing is a deployable Expeditionary Air Wing of the Royal Air Force based at RAF Coningsby, Lincolnshire, England, UK.

The current wing was established on 1 April 2006 the unit has history dating back to February 1943.

== Second World War ==
No. 121 (Rocket Projectile) Wing within No. 22 (Fighter) Sector RAF, No. 83 Group RAF, RAF Second Tactical Air Force (2 TAF) operating Hawker Typhoons was formed on 12 May 1944 at RAF Holmsley South controlling:

- No. 174 Squadron RAF
- No. 175 Squadron RAF
- No. 245 Squadron RAF

The wing moved to France on 16 June 1944 with No. 184 Squadron RAF joining on 15 July 1944, moving to B.24 St Andre-De-L'Eure, B.70 Antwerp, B.80 Volkel, B.100 Goch, B.110 Achmer, B.150 Hustedt, B.164 Schleswig-Holstein, B.160 Kastrup and B.166 Flensburg before returning to England and RAF Dunsfold and being disbanded on 30 September 1945.

=== History of No. 121 Airfield ===
No. 121 Airfield Headquarters was formed on 22 February 1943 under No. 83 Group RAF at RAF Wrexham, the unit moved to RAF Middle Wallop on 28 February 1943. The unit had a short 5 day stay at RAF Membury from 8 March 1943, it moved to RAF Fairlop on 5 April 1943 then to RAF Selsey on 31 May 1943. It further moved to RAF Lydd on 1 July 1943 then RAF Attlebridge on 7 August 1943. The unit moved to RAF Westhampnett on 9 October 1943 then to RAF Holmsley South finally on 1 April 1944. On 12 May 1944, the unit was renamed on No. 121 Wing RAF.

Squadrons:

- No. 19 Squadron RAF (1 March 1943 to 18 May 1943) replaced by No. 65 Squadron RAF (18 May 1943 to 1 July 1943)
- No. 182 Squadron RAF (1 March 1943 to 29 April 1943) replaced by No. 602 Squadron RAF (29 April 1943 to 31 May 1943)
- No. 247 Squadron RAF (1 March 1943 to 26 May 1943) replaced by No. 245 Squadron RAF (26 May 1943 to 12 May 1944)
- No. 174 Squadron RAF (1 July 1943 to 12 May 1944)
- No. 175 Squadron RAF (1 July 1943 to 5 August 1943) (12 August 1943 to 12 May 1944)
- No. 247 Squadron RAF (7 August 1943 to 12 August 1943)

== Post war ==
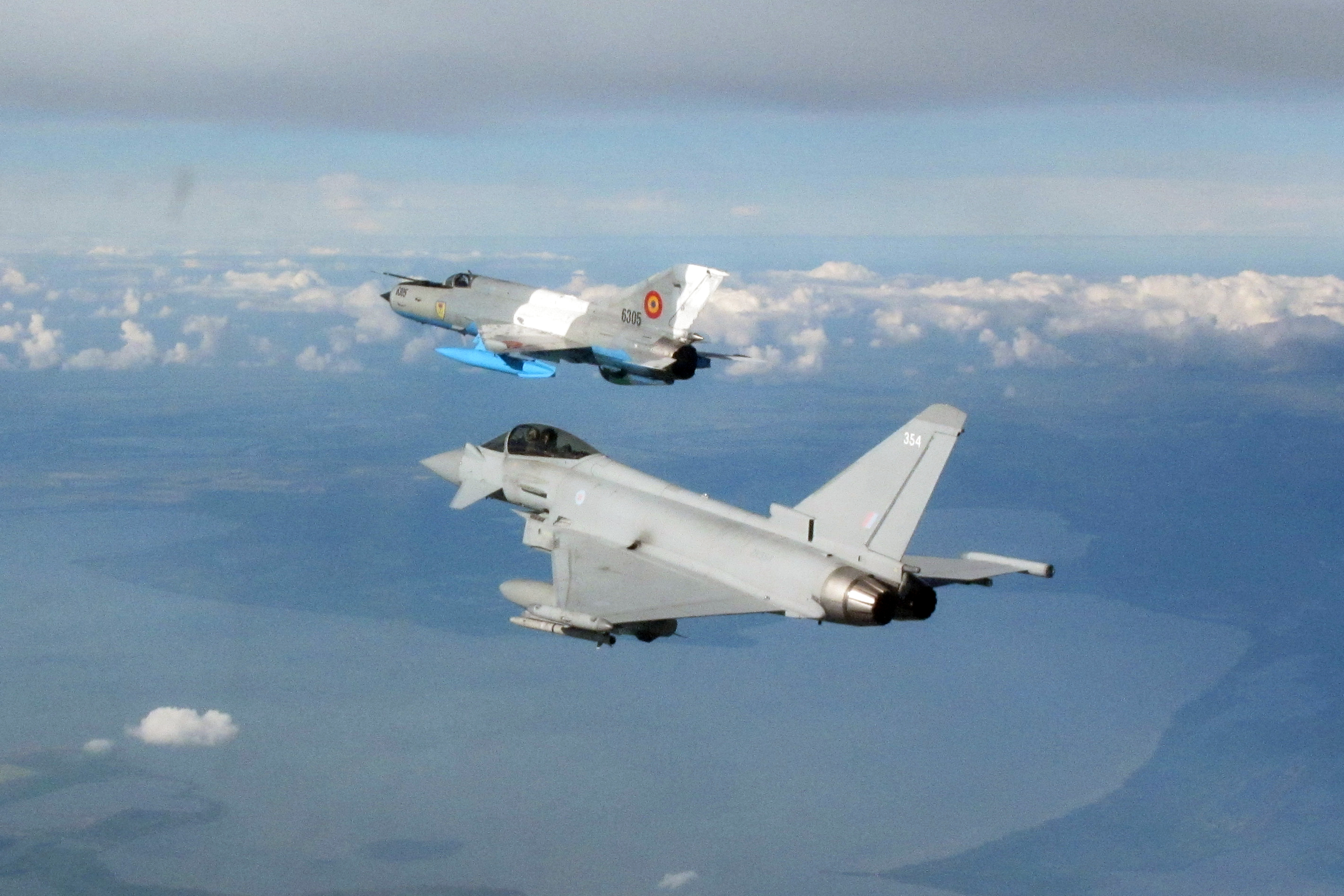
Typhoon of No. 9 Squadron flying in formation with a Romanian Air Force MiG-21 LanceR

The wing was reformed on 1 April 1953 as No. 121 (Day Fighter) Wing still under 2 TAF control at RAF Fassberg controlling: No. 14 Squadron RAF, No. 98 Squadron RAF and No. 118 Squadron RAF. The wing was disbanded on 1 November 1956 while under the control of No. 2 Group RAF. No. 121 Wing was reformed on 1 November 1956 at RAF Gütersloh with No. 59 Squadron RAF and No. 79 Squadron RAF until 1 September 1957 when it was disbanded. The wing reformed again one year later on 1 September 1958 still at Gutersloh with No. 14 Squadron RAF, No. 20 Squadron RAF, No. 26 Squadron RAF and 79 Squadron until it was disbanded again on 1 January 1960.

On 1 April 2006, the No. 121 Expeditionary Air Wing was formed at RAF Coningsby. In 2021, a detachment of No. 9 Squadron consisting of four Eurofighter Typhoons was deployed with 121 EAW at the Mihail Kogălniceanu Air Base in Romania as part of Operation Biloxi under the NATO Enhanced Air Policing mission. During the same deployment, airmen from German Air Force's Taktisches Luftwaffengeschwader 71 "Richthofen" were integrated into the British unit and conducted armed Quick Reaction Alert scramble and intercept training.
