= RAF Laarbruch =

Former Royal Air Force station in North Rhine-Westphalia, Germany

RAF Laarbruch
- Weeze, North Rhine-Westphalia in Germany
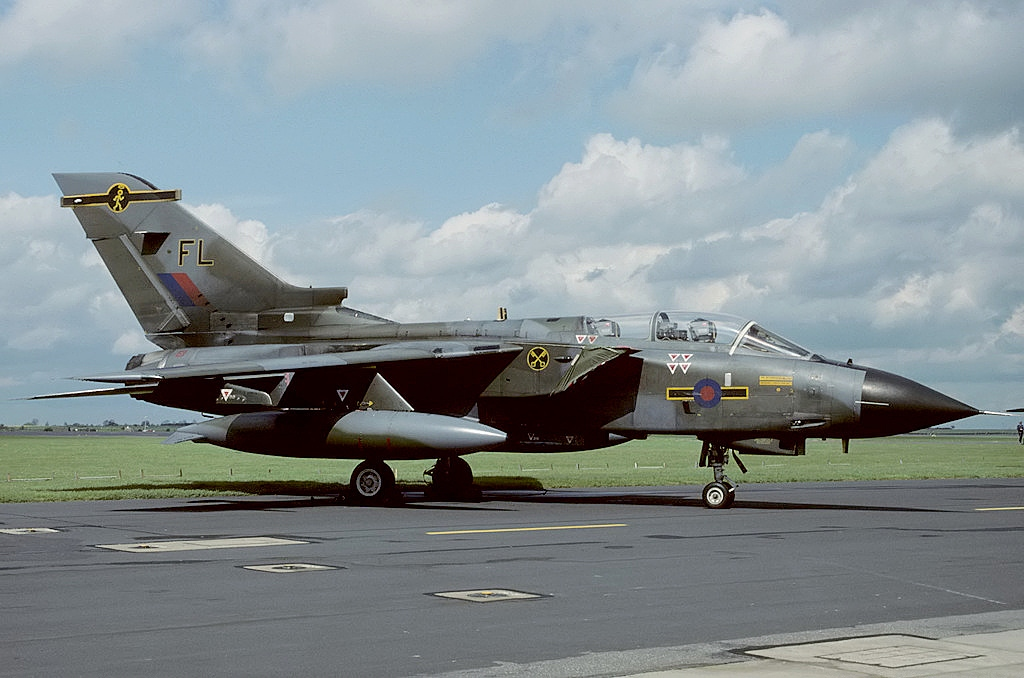
- A Panavia Tornado GR1 of No. 16 Squadron. The unit was based at Laarbruch between 1958 and 1991.

- Eine feste Burg; ("A Mighty Fortress")

Site information
- Type: Royal Air Force station
- Owner: Ministry of Defence (UK)
- Operator: Royal Air Force
- Controlled by: British Forces Germany
- Condition: Closed

Location
- Shown within North Rhine-Westphalia RAF Laarbruch (Germany)
- Coordinates: 51°36′09″N 06°08′32″E

Site history
- Built: 1945 & October 1954
- In use: 1945 – 30 October 1999
- Fate: Transferred to civilian use and became Weeze Airport in 2003.

Airfield information
- Identifiers: IATA: LRC, ICAO: ETUL (EDUL pre 1 Jan 1995), WMO: 10405
Runways
Direction	Length and surface
09/27	2,440 metres (8,005 ft) Concrete/asphalt

Royal Air Force Laarbruch, more commonly known as RAF Laarbruch ICAO EDUL (from 1 January 1995 ETUL) was a Royal Air Force station, a military airfield, located in Germany on its border with the Netherlands. The station's motto was Eine feste Burg (German for 'A Mighty Fortress').

The site now operates as the civilian Weeze Airport, in the Lower Rhine region of Germany. The airport also happens to be less commonly known as Niederrhein Airport.

== History ==
The British army built Advanced Landing Ground Goch (B-100) during the Second World War in preparation for the final push across the Rhine River (Operation Plunder) in early 1945. The infrastructure was straightforward and simple: a 3,600 feet (1,100 m) PSP runway with a parallel 3,000 feet (910 m) grass emergency runway, refuelling was done with jerrycans, and there was enough space for two complete Wings.

It was only used between 4 March and late April 1945. The first unit to fly from the airfield was No. 662 Squadron RAF operating Taylorcraft Auster, who remained at the airfield until 24 March. They were followed by the British 121 Wing (20 March), operating the Hawker Typhoon. Ten days later the Canadian No. 143 Wing joined them. The Hawker Typhoons of 121 Wing were exchanged for the Supermarine Spitfires of Canadian No. 127 Wing by mid-April, but by the end of that month all Wings had left. This ended the use of B-100 airfield.

In 1954, Royal Air Force Germany (RAFG) rebuilt the Second World War airfield, with a 2,565 meters (8,415 ft) runway, as RAF Laarbruch because of the Cold War. Laarbruch was home to various first-line squadrons, including No. 2 Squadron RAF flying the McDonnell Douglas F-4 Phantom FGR.2 and later the SEPECAT Jaguars; and 15 and 16 Squadrons flying Blackburn Buccaneer S.2Bs. These squadrons all moved onto the Panavia Tornado with four squadrons (2, 15, 16, and 20) resident. 25 Squadron's 'C' Flight was also located at Laarbruch, equipped with the Bristol Bloodhound surface to air missile system.

After the first Gulf War, many of the squadrons were relocated, No. 2 Sqn going back to RAF Marham; and 15, 16, and 20 becoming reserve squadrons. When RAF Gütersloh closed, the British Aerospace Harrier GR.5 of No. 3 Squadron RAF and No. 4 Squadron RAF squadrons moved in along with the helicopters of 18(B) Squadron. Laarbruch was also home to 1 and 26 Squadron RAF Regiment. 18 Squadron returned to RAF Odiham in 1997 with the remaining Harrier squadrons departing to RAF Cottesmore in 1999.

After closing in 1999 the airfield found a new civilian lease of life as the budget airline airport Flughafen Niederrhein (Lower Rhine Airport), now known as Weeze Airport after Weeze, the nearest village. Civil operations began in May 2003.

== Laarbruch squadrons ==
- No. 2 Squadron RAF; flying Phantom FGR.2 up to 1976 and the SEPECAT Jaguar GR.1A/T.2A from 1976 until the 1980s, then the Panavia Tornado GR.1/1A from the late 1980s until the unit was re-located to RAF Marham in 1991.
- No. 3 Squadron RAF; flying English Electric Canberra B(I).8 1968–72, from 1992 until 1999 with the BAe Harrier GR.5A, then Harrier GR.7 until the unit was re-located to RAF Cottesmore in 1999.
- No 4 Squadron RAF; flying the BAE Harrier GR.7 version from 1992 until the unit was re-located to RAF Cottesmore in 1999.
- No. 5 Squadron RAF; flying Gloster Javelin FAW.5 1959–62.
- No. 15 Squadron RAF; flying the Blackburn Buccaneer S.2 from the 1970s until conversion to the Panavia Tornado GR.1/1A in 1983 until 1991.
- No. 16 Squadron RAF; flying English Electric Canberra B(I).8 1958–72, Blackburn Buccaneer S.2 1972–83, Panavia Tornado GR.1/A 1983–91
- No. 18 Squadron RAF; flying Boeing Chinook HC.1 helicopters 1992–97, HC.2 conversion started on 1 February 1994.
- No. 20 Squadron RAF; flying Panavia Tornado GR.1/1A 1984–92
- No. 31 Squadron RAF; flying English Electric Canberra PR.7 1955–71
- No. 68 Squadron RAF; flying Gloster Meteor NF.11 (1957–59) until reformation as No.5 Squadron flying Gloster Javelin.
- No. 69 Squadron RAF; flying English Electric Canberra PR.3 1954–58.
- No. 79 Squadron RAF; flying Gloster Meteor FR.9 (54–55)
- No. 80 Squadron RAF; flying English Electric Canberra PR.7 1955–57.
- No. 25 Squadron RAF C Flight; Bristol Bloodhound II missiles
- No. 1 Squadron RAF Regiment
- No. 26 Squadron RAF Regiment with Rapier missiles
- Security Squadron RAF Police supplied on and off station security and Policing duties.
- L Troop, 220 Signal Squadron, 21st Signal Regiment (Air Support)
- 10 Field Squadron RAF(G) Support Royal Engineers
- 50 Field (Construction) Squadron Royal Engineers

== See also ==
- List of former Royal Air Force stations
- List of Royal Air Force aircraft squadrons
