= RAF Heathfield =

Former Royal Air Force station in South Ayrshire, Scotland

RAF Heathfield RNAS Ayr HMS Wagtail USAAF Station 570
- Near Prestwick, South Ayrshire in Scotland

Site information
- Type: Royal Air Force station
- Code: AR
- Owner: Air Ministry
- Operator: Royal Air Force; Royal Navy; United States Air Force
- Controlled by: RAF Fighter Command 1941-44 * No. 13 Group RAF; Fleet Air Arm 1944-46
- Condition: Disused

Location
- Shown within South Ayrshire RAF Heathfield (the United Kingdom)
- Coordinates: 55°29′10″N 004°35′56″W

Site history
- Built: 1940
- In use: April 1941-1946
- Fate: Farmland / Housing / Industry / Leisure
- Battles/wars: European theatre of World War II

Airfield information
- Elevation: 50 feet (15 m) AMSL
Runways
Direction	Length and surface
01/19	1,261 metres (4,137 ft) Tarmac/Asphalt
06/24	1,463 metres (4,800 ft) Tarmac/Asphalt
13/31	1,097 metres (3,599 ft) Tarmac/Asphalt

Royal Air Force Heathfield, or more commonly RAF Heathfield, sometimes known as RAF Ayr/Heathfield due to its proximity to Glasgow Prestwick Airport, which was also used by military flights, is a former Royal Air Force station. The airfield was situated 0.75 miles (1 km) from the coastline, on the periphery of the towns of Prestwick and Ayr, and is located 4 miles (6 km) away from the town and port of Troon.

It opened in April 1941 as an airbase for Royal Air Force day and night fighter squadrons. In September 1944 it was transferred to the Royal Navy. Known as Royal Naval Air Station Ayr (RNAS Ayr) and was commissioned as HMS Wagtail. It was 'paid off' in March 1946 and reduced to care and maintenance. The United States Air Force used it for storage between 1951 and 1957.

Like many other wartime airfields, its runways were of the triangular layout.

== History ==
=== Royal Air Force use ===
The following units were posted here at some point:

- No. 1 Squadron RAF
- No. 3 Squadron RAF
- No. 18 Squadron RAF
- No. 26 (South African) Squadron RAF
- No. 56 Squadron RAF
- No. 64 Squadron RAF
- No. 72 Squadron RAF
- No. 81 Squadron RAF
- No. 130 (Punjab) Squadron RAF
- No. 141 Squadron RAF
- No. 165 (Ceylon) Squadron RAF
- No. 169 Squadron RAF
- No. 186 Squadron RAF
- No. 219 (Mysore) Squadron RAF
- No. 222 (Natal) Squadron RAF
- No. 232 Squadron RAF
- No. 239 Squadron RAF
- No. 241 Squadron RAF
- No. 278 Squadron RAF
- No. 281 Squadron RAF
- No. 282 Squadron RAF
- No. 289 Squadron RAF
- No. 312 (Czechoslovak) Squadron RAF
- No. 313 (Czechoslovak) Squadron RAF
- No. 322 (Dutch) Squadron RAF
- No. 329 (GC I/2 'Cicognes') Squadron RAF
- No. 340 (GC IV/2 Île-de-France) Squadron RAF
- No. 345 (GC II/2 'Berry') Squadron RAF
- No. 402 Squadron RCAF
- No. 406 Squadron RCAF
- No. 410 Squadron RCAF
- No. 438 Squadron RCAF
- No. 439 (Fighter Bomber) Squadron RCAF
- No. 440 (Fighter Bomber) Squadron RCAF
- No. 485 Squadron RNZAF
- No. 486 Squadron RNZAF
- No. 488 Squadron RNZAF
- No. 516 Squadron RAF
- No. 602 (City of Glasgow) Squadron AAF
- No. 611 (West Lancashire) Squadron AAF
- No. 651 Squadron RAF
- No. 652 Squadron RAF

Units

- No. 8 Gliding School RAF (May 1944 – June 1945)
- Detachment from No. 13 Group Anti-Aircraft Co-operation Flight (1941)
- No. 22 (RCAF) (Fighter) Wing RAF (January – February 1944)
- Detachment from No. 58 Operational Training Unit RAF (October 1942)
- No. 143 (RCAF) Airfield Headquarters RAF (January – March 1944)
- 415th Night Fighter Squadron, with the USAAF regarding the location as USAAF Station 570
- No. 1490 (Fighter) Gunnery Flight (April – October 1943) then No. 14 Armament Practice Camp (October 1943 – September 1944)
- No. 1497 (Target Towing) Flight (June – July 1943)

== Royal Navy ==
=== HMS Wagtail (1944-1946) ===
The airbase was transferred on loan from No. 13 Group RAF to the Admiralty on 6 September 1944, when the Royal Navy assumed control under Commander(A) H. L. McCullock. Renamed Royal Naval Air Station Ayr (RNAS Ayr), the station was commissioned shortly afterwards, on 20 October 1944, as HMS Wagtail. One of the runways was redesigned for use by the Fleet Air Arm, enabling pilots to practise aircraft carrier landing techniques. During its period of naval control, HMS Wagtail supported a range of Fleet Air Arm activities. The station provided facilities for disembarked fighter squadrons and hosted a Bombardment Spotting School, No. 3 Barracuda Servicing Unit, and the Flag Officer Carrier Training Squadron. It also offered accommodation for two RAF squadrons. HMS Wagtail was 'paid off' on 10 March 1946, after which the station was placed on Care and Maintenance Status under the administration of RNAS Abbotsinch.

=== Squadrons at HMS Wagtail ===
A list of Royal Navy Fleet Air Arm aviation squadrons that were either stationed at or deployed to HMS Wagtail:

- 730 Naval Air Squadron
- 740 Naval Air Squadron
- 768 Naval Air Squadron
- 770 Naval Air Squadron
- 772 Naval Air Squadron
- 800 Naval Air Squadron
- 802 Naval Air Squadron
- 808 Naval Air Squadron
- 812 Naval Air Squadron
- 815 Naval Air Squadron
- 819 Naval Air Squadron
- 821 Naval Air Squadron
- 824 Naval Air Squadron
- 825 Naval Air Squadron
- 835 Naval Air Squadron
- 837 Naval Air Squadron
- 846 Naval Air Squadron
- 848 Naval Air Squadron
- 853 Naval Air Squadron
- 860 Naval Air Squadron
- 882 Naval Air Squadron
- 885 Naval Air Squadron
- 886 Naval Air Squadron
- 889 Naval Air Squadron
- 896 Naval Air Squadron
- 899 Naval Air Squadron
- 1770 Naval Air Squadron
- 1771 Naval Air Squadron
- 1840 Naval Air Squadron
- 1841 Naval Air Squadron
- 1843 Naval Air Squadron
- 1845 Naval Air Squadron
- 1846 Naval Air Squadron
- 1850 Naval Air Squadron

== United States Air Force ==
The site was used by the United States Air Force (USAF) between 1951 and 1957 for aircraft storage use. From then on the USAF decided to solely use the adjacent Prestwick.

== Current use ==
The site is now a mixture of housing, farmland and a golf club.

== See also ==
- List of former Royal Air Force stations
