= RAF Hurn =

Former Royal Air Force station in Dorset, England

RAF Hurn USAAF Station AAF-492
- Near Bournemouth, Dorset in England
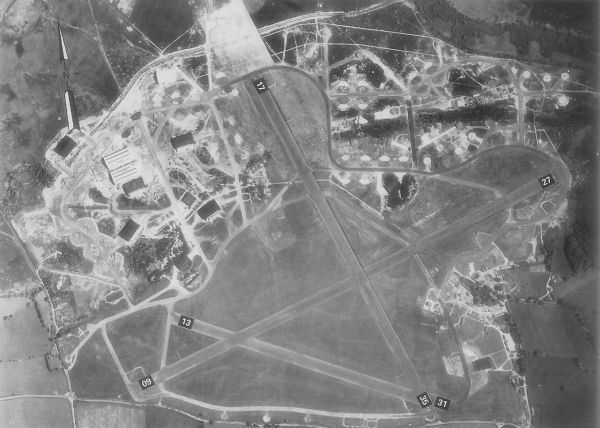
- Hurn airfield photographed in May 1947 still showing its Second World War configuration

Site information
- Type: Royal Air Force station
- Code: KU
- Owner: Air Ministry
- Operator: Royal Air Force; United States Army Air Forces 1944
- Controlled by: RAF Fighter Command 1941-44 * No. 11 Group RAF; Ninth Air Force

Location
- Shown within Dorset RAF Hurn (the United Kingdom)
- Coordinates: 50°46′54″N 001°50′23″W

Site history
- Built: 1940/41
- In use: July 1941 - 1946
- Battles/wars: European theatre of World War II

Airfield information
- Elevation: 10 metres (33 ft) AMSL
Runways
Direction	Length and surface
00/00	Concrete
00/00	Concrete
00/00	Concrete

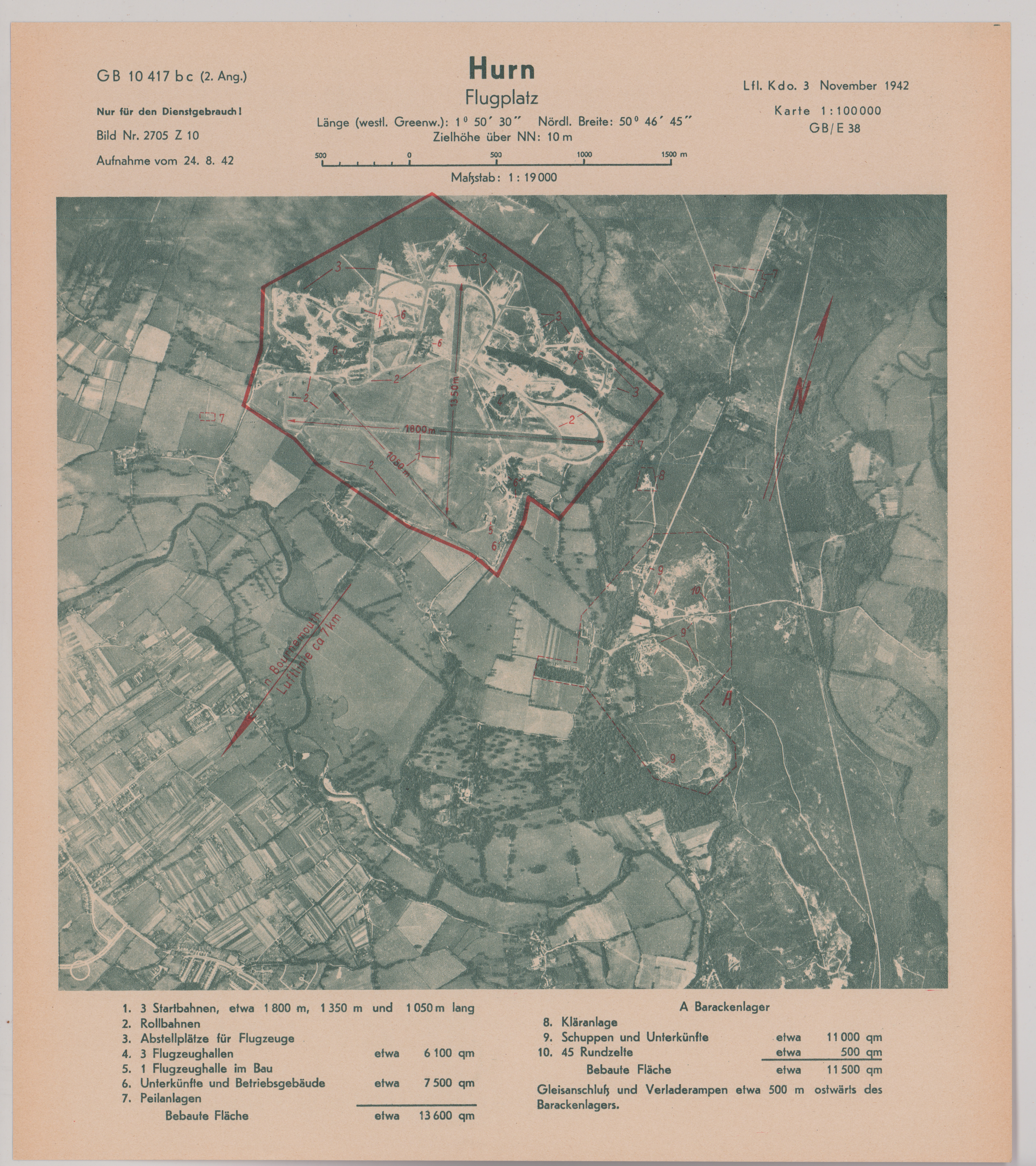
RAF Hurn on a target dossier of the German Luftwaffe, 1942

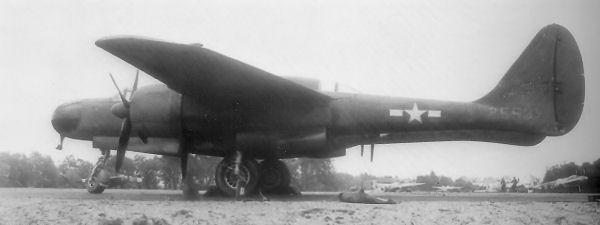
Northrop P-61A-5-NO Black Widow Serial 42-5535 of the 422nd Night Fighter Squadron.

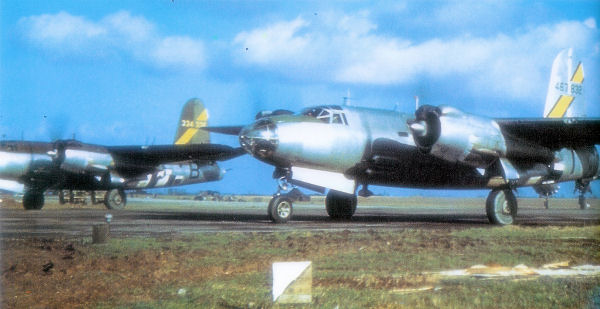
Martin B-26C-45-MO Marauder Serial 42-107832 of the 598th Bomb Squadron.

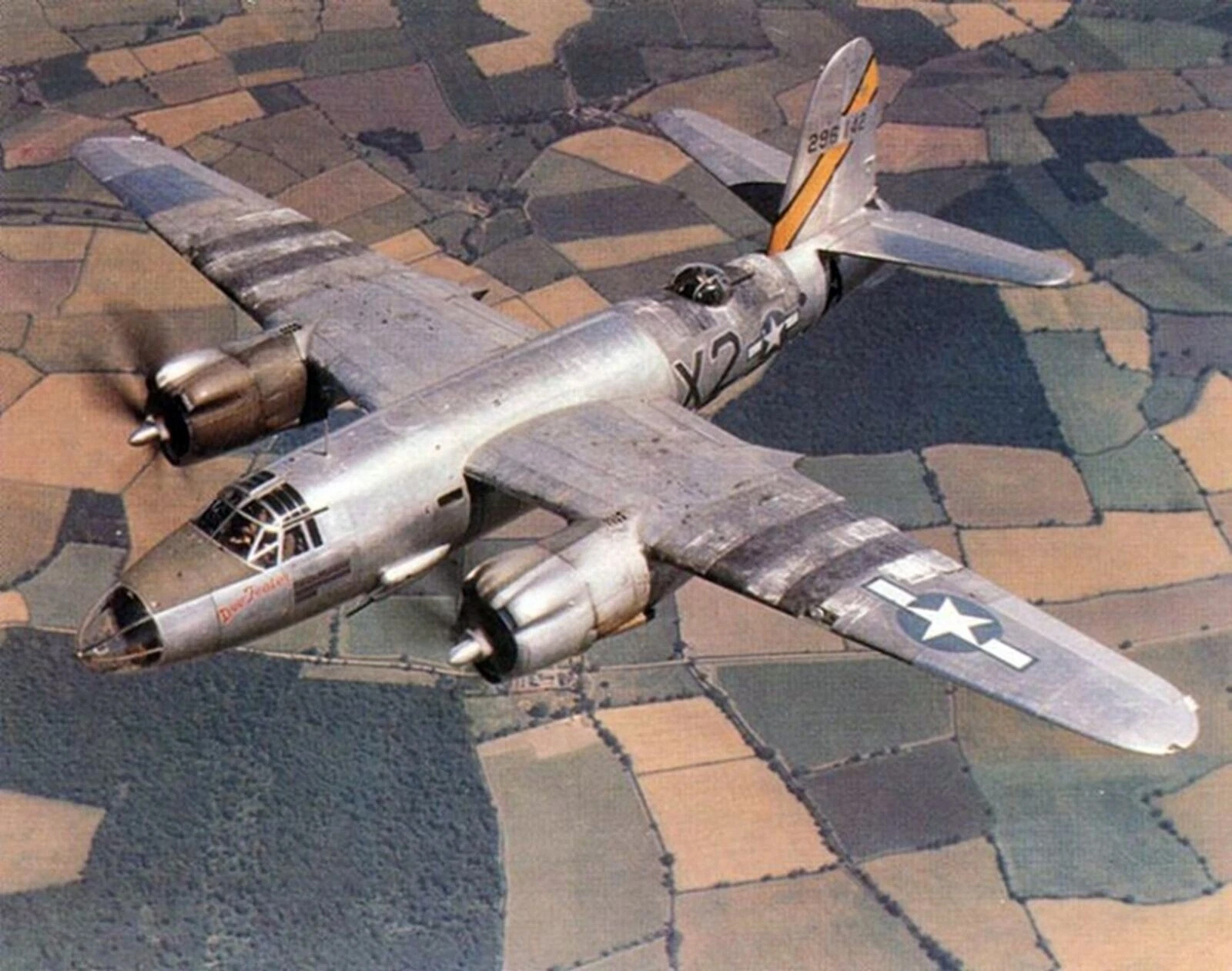
Martin B-26B-55-MA Marauder Serial 42-96142 of the 596th Bombardment Squadron.

Royal Air Force Hurn or more simply RAF Hurn is a former Royal Air Force station located approximately 4 miles (6.4 km) north west of Christchurch, Dorset, England.

Opened in 1941, it was used by both the Royal Air Force and United States Army Air Forces. During the war it was used primarily as a transport and fighter airfield.

Hurn was the final airfield in England for aircraft flying to Morocco for the North African and Italian campaigns, avoiding France, Spain and Portugal airspace.

Since 1969, it has also been called Bournemouth Airport. The RAF have returned to Hurn in the form of a temporary Outsourcing Contract for Multi-Engine Pilot Training to cope with limited capacity through normal Training Provisions using L3 Harris Airline Academy (2018 -).

== RAF use ==
The following squadrons were here at some point

- No. 88 (Hong Kong) Squadron RAF
- No. 125 (Newfoundland) Squadron RAF (1944)
- No. 170 Squadron RAF
- No. 198 Squadron RAF (1944)
- No. 239 Squadron RAF
- No. 263 (Fellowship of the Bellows) Squadron RAF (1944)
- No. 277 Squadron RAF
- No. 295 Squadron RAF
- No. 296 Squadron RAF
- No. 297 Squadron RAF
- No. 412 Squadron RCAF (1943)
- No. 418 Squadron RCAF (1944)
- No. 570 Squadron RAF
- No. 604 (County of Middlesex) Squadron AAF (1944)
- No. 609 (West Riding) Squadron AAF
- No. 620 Squadron RAF

Units:

- No. 2 Air Experience Flight RAF
- No. 3 Overseas Aircraft Despatch Unit RAF
- No. 16 (Mobile Fighter) Wing RAF
- No. 19 (Fighter) Sector RAF
- No. 20 (Fighter) Sector RAF
- No. 22 (RCAF) (Fighter) Sector RAF
- No. 22 (RCAF) (Fighter) Wing RAF
- No. 124 Airfield Headquarters RAF became No. 124 (Rocket Projectile) Wing RAF
  - No. 181 Squadron RAF (1944)
  - No. 182 Squadron RAF (1944)
  - No. 247 (China-British) Squadron RAF (1944)
- No. 136 (Fighter) Wing RAF
  - No. 164 (Argentine–British) Squadron RAF (1944)
  - No. 183 (Gold Coast) Squadron RAF (1944)
- No. 143 (RCAF) Airfield Headquarters RAF became No. 143 (RCAF) (Fighter) Wing RAF
  - No. 438 Squadron RCAF (1944)
  - No. 439 Squadron RCAF (1944)
  - No. 440 Squadron RCAF (1944)
- No. 146 (Fighter) Wing RAF
  - No. 193 (Fellowship of the Bellows) Squadron RAF (1944)
  - No. 197 Squadron RAF (1944)
  - No. 257 (Burma) Squadron RAF (1944)
  - No. 266 (Rhodesia) Squadron RAF (1944)
- No. 403 Repair & Salvage Unit
- No. 419 (RCAF) Repair & Salvage Unit
- No. 1302 Mobile Wing RAF Regiment
- No. 1498 (Target Towing) Flight RAF
- No. 2739 Squadron RAF Regiment
- No. 2742 Squadron RAF Regiment
- No. 2768 Squadron RAF Regiment
- No. 2773 Squadron RAF Regiment
- No. 2794 Squadron RAF Regiment
- No. 2796 Squadron RAF Regiment
- No. 3206 Servicing Commando
- Heavy Glider Maintenance Unit
- Southampton University Air Squadron

== USAAF use ==
Hurn was known as USAAF Station AAF-492 for security reasons by the USAAF during the war, and by which it was referred to instead of location. Its USAAF Station Code was "KU".

=== 422nd Night Fighter Squadron ===
On 28 June 1944, Northrop P-61 Black Widow night fighters of the 422nd Night Fighter Squadron arrived from RAF Scorton, where their crews had been tutored in this particular aspect of air combat by the RAF. The detachment commenced operational flying on 3 July only to return to Scorton a week later.

=== 397th Bombardment Group ===
On 5 August the 397th Bombardment Group arrived from RAF Rivenhall, equipped with Martin B-26 Marauders. The group consisted of the following operational squadrons:

- 596th Bombardment Squadron (X2)
- 597th Bombardment Squadron (9F)
- 598th Bombardment Squadron (U2)
- 599th Bombardment Squadron (6B)

The group's identification marking was a yellow diagonal band across both sides of the vertical tailplane. It moved the Advanced Landing Ground at Gorges, France, (A-26) on 19 August

The airfield was closed by the RAF in October 1944 and turned over for civil use.

== See also ==
- List of former Royal Air Force stations
