= No. 39 Wing RCAF =

No. 39 Wing RCAF No. 83 (RCAF) (Reconnaissance) Wing RAF No. 39 (Reconnaissance) Wing RCAF No. 39 (Army Co-operation) Wing RCAF 39th (Training) Wing RFC
- Active: 27 October 1917 - 4 April 1919 (RFC/RAF); 3 December 1942 – 9 July 1943 (RCAF); 9 July 1943 - 7 August 1945 (RAF)
- Country: Canada; United Kingdom
- Branch: Royal Canadian Air Force; Royal Air Force
- Type: Wing
- Role: Reconnaissance
- Part of: First Canadian Army; RAF Second Tactical Air Force

No. 39 Wing RCAF was a unit of the Royal Canadian Air Force which served with the Royal Air Force in Europe during the Second World War.

== History ==
No. 39 Wing was established on 12 September 1942 as an "Army Cooperation" Wing at Leatherhead, Surrey, England. It comprised No. 400 Squadron RCAF, No. 414 Squadron RCAF, and No. 430 Squadron RCAF. As a reconnaissance unit, its purpose was to gather photographic intelligence in support of allied ground operations.

However Ray Sturtivant and John Hamlin in their 2007 edition of "Royal Air Force flying training and support units since 1912" states the unit was reformed on 3 December 1942. However Ken Delve in his 1994 book "The Source Book of the RAF" says No. 39 Wing RCAF was formed on 1 August 1943 at RAF Redhill, disbanding on 7 August 1945.

The Wing left the UK and moved to the European continent on 2 July 1944 at Sommervieu, France. The Wing moved ever eastward following the front and finished the war at airfield B156 Luneburg, Germany where it was finally disbanded.

== Aircraft ==
- Curtiss Tomahawk I (1942–1943)
- North American Mustang I (1942–1945)
- Supermarine Spitfire LF IX (1944–1945)
- de Havilland Mosquito PR XVI (1943–1945)

== Commanding Officers ==
- G/C D.M. Smith, 12 Sep 42 – 9 Feb 44
- G/C E.H.G. Moncrieff AFC, 10 Feb 44 – 8 Feb 45
- G/C G.H. Sellers, AFC, 9 Feb 45 – 15 May 45
- G/C R.C.A. Waddell, DSO DFC, 16 May 45 – 7 Aug 45

== See also ==
- List of Wings of the Royal Air Force
