= Flensburg-Schäferhaus Airport =

Flensburg-Schäferhaus Airport (Advanced Landing Ground B-166)
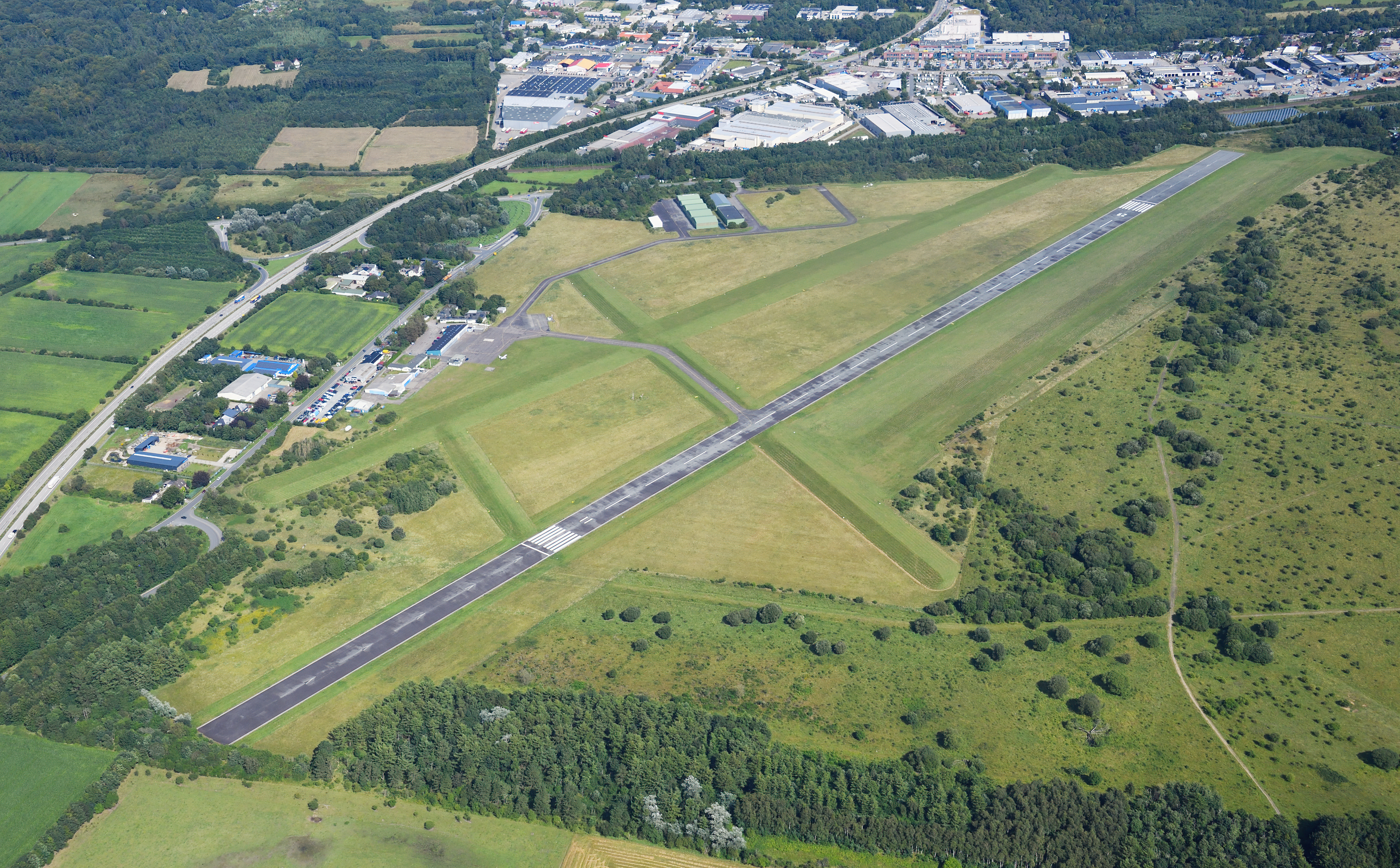
- IATA: FLF; ICAO: EDXF

Summary
- Airport type: Public
- Location: Flensburg, Germany
- Elevation AMSL: 40 m (130 ft)
- Coordinates: 54°46′25″N 009°22′36″E

Map
- Location of Flensburg-Schäferhaus Airport

Runways
Direction	Length		Surface
Direction	m	ft	Surface
04/22	700	2,297	Grass
11/29	1,220	4,003	Asphalt
11L/29R	1,200	3,797	Grass

Flensburg-Schäferhaus Airport is a regional airport in Germany (IATA: FLF, ICAO: EDXF). It supports general aviation with no commercial airline service scheduled.

== History ==
During World War II, the airport was used by the British Royal Air Force as Advanced Landing Ground B-166 Flensburg. There has been scheduled domestic passenger traffic, although not after around 1980.
