= No. 124 Wing RAF =

No. 124 Wing RAF No. 124 (Rocket Projectile) Wing RAF
- Active: 1943-46; 1953-57
- Country: United Kingdom
- Branch: Royal Air Force
- Role: Close air support
- Size: Wing
- Part of: RAF Second Tactical Air Force

Aircraft flown
- Attack: Hawker Typhoon

No. 124 Wing RAF was a Hawker Typhoon Wing of the Royal Air Force during the Second World War. It comprised No. 137 Squadron RAF, No. 181 Squadron RAF, No. 182 Squadron RAF and No. 247 (China-British) Squadron RAF.

On 10 June 1944 the wing took part in the Attack on Panzer Group West's headquarters at La Caine. Prior to the Normandy landings on 6 June 1944, the headquarters of Panzer Group West was established in the Chateau at La Caine. On 9 June 1944, three days after the Normandy landings, the headquarters' location was revealed to British Intelligence by deciphering of German signals traffic. On 10 June 1944, aircraft of the Second Tactical Air Force bombed the village. The raid was carried out by 40 rocket-armed Typhoons of No. 124 Wing (consisting of Nos. 181, 182 and 247 Squadrons) which attacked in three waves from low altitude and by 61 Mitchells of No. 137 and 139 Wings (comprising Nos 226, 98, 180 and 320 Squadrons) which dropped 500 lb bombs from 12,000 ft.

The wing was active from 12 December 1944 until 30 April 1946 as a Rocket Projectile unit and from 1 April 1953 - 2 October 1957 as a fighter unit.

On 1 July 1956, the wing was part of No. 2 Group RAF, RAF Second Tactical Air Force and located at RAF Oldenburg. It comprised No. 14 Squadron RAF, 20 Squadron, and 26 Squadron, all flying Hawker Hunters.

== See also ==
- List of Wings of the Royal Air Force
