= No. 143 Wing RAF =

No. 143 Wing RAF No. 143 (RCAF) (Fighter) Wing RAF
- Active: May 1944 - August 1945
- Country: United Kingdom
- Branch: Royal Air Force
- Size: Wing
- Part of: RAF Second Tactical Air Force; No. 83 (Composite) Group RAF

No. 143 Wing RAF was a unit of the Royal Air Force which served in Europe during the Second World War.

== History ==
RAF Second Tactical Air Force was established on 1 June 1943. No. 143 Wing was established on 10 January 1944. It comprised No. 438 Squadron RCAF, No. 439 Squadron RCAF, and No. 440 Squadron RCAF. As a fighter-ground attack unit, its purpose was to support the Canadian and British troops of 21st Army Group.

On 5 June 1944 while at RAF Hurn as "No. 143 (RCAF) (Fighter) Wing RAF"

From 22/23 June 1944 to 30 August 1944 the wing was located at B.5 (FRESNE CAMILLE) (for two days only) and then Lantheuil (B.9), just south of Creully, before moving forward to keep up with the ground forces.

The Typhoon aircraft has been painted by Robert Bailey, picturing F/Lt Harry Hardy, RCAF, flying the "Pulverizer 2".

Sqn Ldr Donald A. Brewster OBE was the Wing's Chief Technical Officer from April 1944 until the end of the war.

The wing disbanded on 26 August 1945.

== Aircraft ==
- Hawker Hurricane IV (November 1943 - May 1944)
- Hawker Typhoon IB (January 1944 - August 1945)

== See also ==
- List of Wings of the Royal Air Force
