= Bazenville Airfield =

Bazenville Airfield Crépon Airfield Advanced Landing Ground B-2
- Bazenville Airfield (France)

Site information
- Type: Military Airfield
- Controlled by: Royal Air Force

Location
- Coordinates: 49°18′17″N 000°33′43″W

Site history
- In use: June–August 1944
- Battles/wars: Western Front

Bazenville Airfield is a former Second World War airfield, located 1.8 km east of Bazenville in the Lower Normandy region, France. The B-2 Bazenville Advanced Landing Ground (ALG) was located only 5 kilometres (3.1 mi) southwest from the Normandy Gold landing beach, and when it opened the frontline was only 9 kilometres (5.6 mi) away.

== History ==
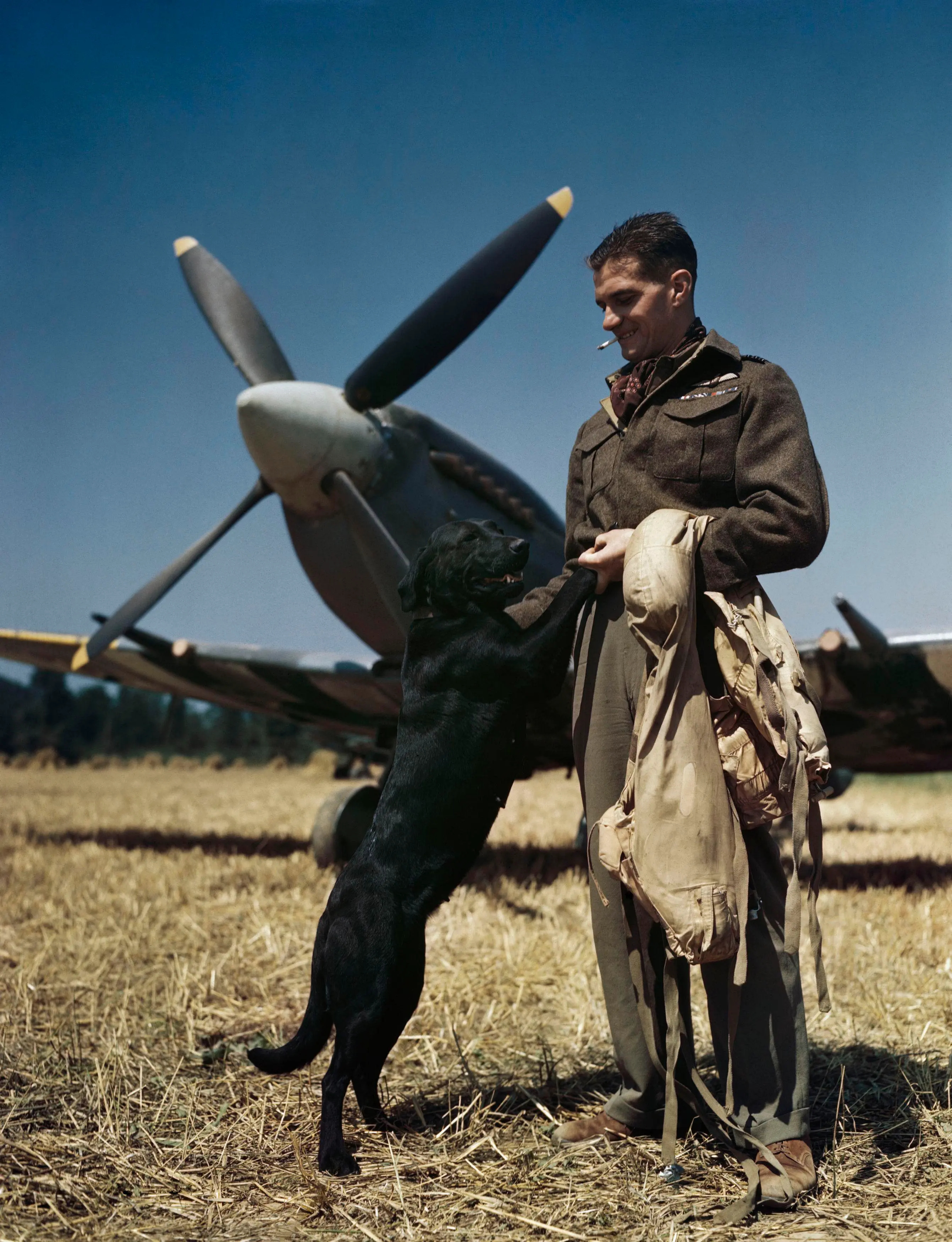
RAF ace Johnnie Johnson with his pet Labrador dog, 'Sally', at Bazenville Landing Ground, 31 July 1944

Bazenville Airfield was constructed by the Royal Engineers 16th Airfield Construction Group together with the RAF's 3207 and 3209 Servicing Commandos starting just after midnight after D-Day, 6 June 1944. The construction consisted of a 5,000' square-mesh track (SMT) surfaced runway aligned 07/25, dispersal areas, communications facilities, landing lights and many other requirements to run an airfield. Bazenville would have been completed as the first ALG in Normandy on 9 June, but a B-24 Liberator crashlanded at the uncompleted airfield that morning and ripped up a lot of SMT. Instead it was completed two days later, on 11 June, and serviced the first 36 aircraft (Spitfires) of No. 127 Wing RCAF that same day.

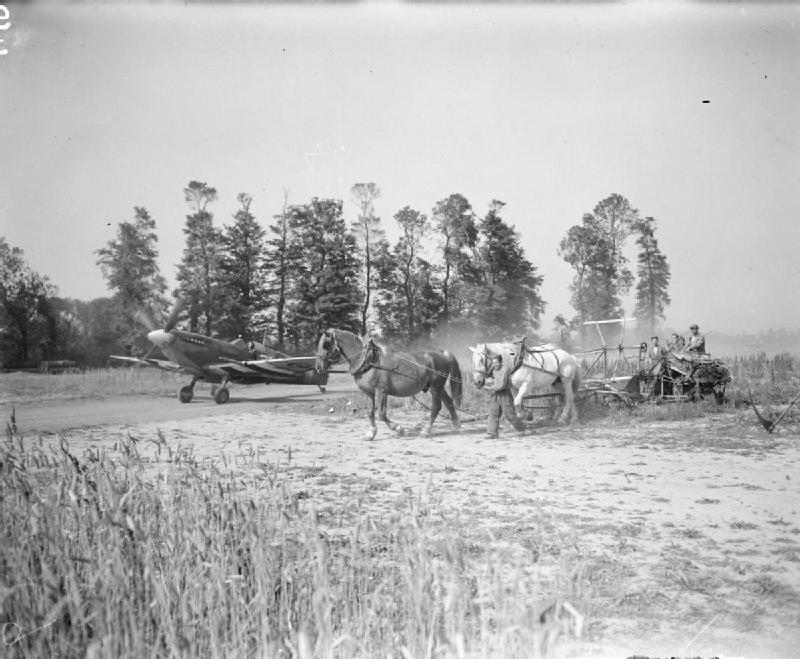
A Spitfire Mark IX of No. 443 Squadron RCAF taxies to dispersal at B2/Bazenville, alongside a field where French farmers are gathering in the wheat

The complete RCAF Wing (403, 416, 421 and 443 Sqns) moved in on 16 June 1944. Its facilities were those of a full air base, with dispersals all around the airstrip. A fuel and ammunition dump was located south of the airfield. Rows of tents housing nearly 1,000 men were located in orchards to the southeast.

A local church is believed to have served as Ground Control for the entire Normandy 2d Tactical Air Force area of responsibility. Over the first month of its existence, the frontline only moved to 19 kilometres (12 mi) away. While 127 Wing operated from the airfield it was also used to evacuate thousands of injured soldiers, sailors and airmen to England. In addition a constant stream of other Allied squadrons used the airfield for fuel, ammunition or repair.

Bazenville was used until 28 August 1944, and afterwards the engineers moved in and dismantled all recoverable equipment along with the SMT. The land was then returned to the French farmers, and over the years, the land has been used as agricultural fields. Today, nothing remains of the former airfield.
