= Henry Wallace McLeod =

Canadian flying ace (1915–1944)

- Official RAF photo, c. 1942
- Born: 17 December 1915; Regina, Saskatchewan, Canada
- Died: 27 September 1944 (aged 28); Wesel/Duisburg, Germany
- Military career
- Allegiance: Canada
- Branch: Royal Canadian Air Force
- Service years: 1940–1944
- Rank: Squadron leader
- Nicknames: "Wally" "The Eagle of Malta"
- Units: No. 132 Squadron RCAF (21 July – 28 August 1941); No. 485 Squadron RCAF (28 August – 2 December 1941); No. 602 Squadron (2–23 December 1941); No. 411 Squadron (23 December 1941 – 5 May 1942); No. 603 Squadron RCAF (3 June 1942 to June/July 1942); No. 1435 Squadron RCAF (June/July 1942 – 26 October 1942); No. 443 Squadron RCAF (12 February 1944 – 27 September 1944.
- Conflicts: Wars: Second World War; Battles: Battle of Malta; Battle of Normandy; Theatres: Western and Channel Fronts; African, Mediterranean and Middle East theatre of World War II
- Awards: Distinguished Service Order; Distinguished Flying Cross & Bar

Flight Lieutenant Henry Wallace McLeod DSO, DFC and Bar (17 December 1915 – 27 September 1944) was a Canadian fighter pilot and flying ace with the Royal Canadian Air Force during the Second World War. He achieved a total of 21 enemy aircraft destroyed, three probably destroyed, and 11 damaged, and one shared damaged. McLeod scored 13 kills during the Battle of Malta, earning the nickname "The Eagle of Malta".

== Early life ==
Henry McLeod was born in Regina, Saskatchewan to James Archibald McLeod, and Hannah Elizabeth McLeod on 17 December 1915. James McLeod was from Brooklyn, Nova Scotia and went to Acadia University. At the time of James' death, long after World War II, he was reputed to be the oldest living graduate of Acadia. McLeod's mother, Hannah, died from Spanish flu, during the pandemic, when he was three. McLeod was an average student, never excelling, but always managing pass grades. From a young age he had a reputation as a fast learner.

McLeod began his military career in 1928, serving with the 5th Saskatchewan Regiment and Regina Rifle Regiment until 1934. McLeod joined the Royal Canadian Air Force on 2 September 1940. He graduated from training on 1 April 1941 and arrived in Great Britain on 9 May 1941, attending 57 OTU.

== Second World War ==
=== RCAF ===
McLeod began fighter sweeps over France in July 1941 with No. 485 Squadron and No. 411 RCAF. By May 1942 he had scored five victories. On 13 October 1942 McLeod was awarded the Distinguished Flying Cross. The citation read:

Air Ministry, 13th October 1942.

ROYAL AIR FORCE.
The KING has been graciously pleased to approve the following awards in recognition of gallantry displayed in flying operations against the enemy: —
[...]
Distinguished Flying Cross
[...]
Acting Flight Lieutenant Henry Wallace McLEOD (Can/J.4912), Royal Canadian Air Force.

In September 1942, this officer participated in an engagement against at least 20 Messerschmitt 109's [sic]. Despite the odds, Flight Lieutenant McLeod so skilfully led his section during the combat that the enemy force was completely broken up. This officer has always displayed the greatest determination to engage the enemy and has destroyed at least 5 and damaged a number of other hostile aircraft. His leadership has been most inspiring.

Soon afterwards McLeod was moved to No. 603 Squadron on Malta and in July joined No 1435 Squadron. On 3 November 1942, he received a Bar to his DFC for his actions in the island's defence. It is believed McLeod was credited with 12 enemy aircraft at this point. During his time in Malta, it is thought McLeod may have shot down and killed the 47 victory ace Heinz "Figaro" Golinski on 16 October 1942. The citation read:

Air Ministry, 3rd November 1942.

ROYAL AIR FORCE.
The KING has been graciously pleased to approve the following awards in recognition of gallantry displayed in flying operations against the enemy: —
[...]
Bar to the Distinguished Flying Cross
[...]
Acting Flight Lieutenant Henry Wallace McLEOD, D.F.C. (Can./J.4912), Royal Canadian Air Force.

One day in October, 1942, this officer took part in an attack on a formation of six Junkers 88's and shot two of them down. Although his aircraft was damaged in the combat he led his section in an attack on another formation of nine enemy bombers. Afterwards, he skilfully flew his damaged aircraft to base. During a period of five days Flight Lieutenant McLeod destroyed five enemy aircraft in the defence of Malta. A gallant fighter, this officer has destroyed 12 and damaged many more enemy aircraft.

On 4 December 1942 it was reported that McLeod had been sent for a rest in Britain after destroying 13 enemy aircraft in three months. Included in his claims were seven Messerschmitt Bf 109s, three Junkers Ju 88s and three Macchi C.202.

On 5 September 1944 McLeod was appointed a Companion of the Distinguished Service Order for 250 missions and 21 aerial victories, plus three probably destroyed and 12 damaged. McLeod scored most of his kills in the Spitfire Mk V, scoring 13 kills, two probables, 11 damaged and 1 shared damaged. The citation read:

Air Ministry 5th September 1944.

The KING has been graciously pleased to approve the following awards in recognition of gallantry displayed in flying operations against the enemy:—
Distinguished Service Order.
[...]
Acting Squadron Leader Henry Wallace McLEOD, D.F.C. (Can/J.4912), R.C.A.F., 443 (R.C.A.F.) Sqn.

This officer continues to display the highest standard of courage and resolution in air operations. He is an exceptional leader and a relentless fighter whose achievements are worthy of the highest praise. He has destroyed 17 enemy aircraft.

=== Death ===
On 27 September 1944, McLeod was leading a section of six aircraft of his squadron on high patrol as part of the fighter Wing led by Wing Commander James "Johnnie" Johnson over Nijmegen, Netherlands. During the action McLeod went missing. Johnson made repeated calls over the R/T, but McLeod did not answer. After landing, Johnson could see his friend had not returned. Johnson questioned the rest of the pilots and one reported seeing Wally chasing a lone Messerschmitt. Knowing McLeod's character, Johnson believed he would have attacked regardless of the enemy fighter's advantage:

I feel certain that he wouldn't have let go of the 109 until the issue had been decided one way or the other. There was no other aircraft in the area [that Johnson had seen] and they must have fought it out together, probably above the cloud. To start with he would have been at a disadvantage, for the 109 was already several thousand feet higher. I think the Messerschmitt got him. It was always all or nothing for Wally.

Remains of his Spitfire IX (NH425) were discovered in September 1949. McLeod was still in the wreckage of his Spitfire, in the outskirts of Wesel, near Duisburg, just inside the German border. He was buried in the Commonwealth War Graves Commission cemetery at Rheinberg. McLeod may have been shot down by Major Siegfried Freytag of Jagdgeschwader 77 flying a Bf 109, who claimed on this day, the only Spitfire shot down in the Duisburg area near Wesel for his 101st victory.

== Honours and tributes ==
In September 2002, a building at 15 Wing, the military air training base south of Moose Jaw was named for Henry Wallace McLeod. A McLeod Street in Regina's industrial district is jointly named for him and for broadcaster Jim McLeod (no relation).
