= No. 421 Squadron RCAF =

Canadian air force squadron

No. 421 (Red Indian) Squadron RCAF
- Active: 9 April 1942 to 23 July 1945; 15 September 1949 to 31 August 1992
- Country: Canada
- Branch: Royal Canadian Air Force and Royal Canadian Artillery
- Type: Article XV squadron
- Nickname: Red Indian
- Motto: Bellicum Cecinere
- Battle honours: Defence of Britain 1942-43, Fortress Europe 1942-44, France and Germany 1944-45, Normandy 1944 Arnhem Rhine

Aircraft flown
- Fighter: Supermarine Spitfire de Havilland Vampire; Canadair Sabre; Canadair CF-104 Starfighter; McDonnell Douglas CF-18 Hornet

No. 421 Squadron RCAF was a unit of the Royal Canadian Air Force. It was the last RCAF fighter squadron to be formed in the UK during World War II.

== Establishment ==
Initially established at RAF Digby in April 1942 with Supermarine Spitfire Mk VA, the squadron moving to RAF Fairwood Common in May and received Spitfire Mk VB.

The squadron's motto was Bellicum cecinere ("They have sounded the war trumpet"). Its badge was, in front of two tomahawks in saltire, a Red Indian warrior.

== Second World War ==
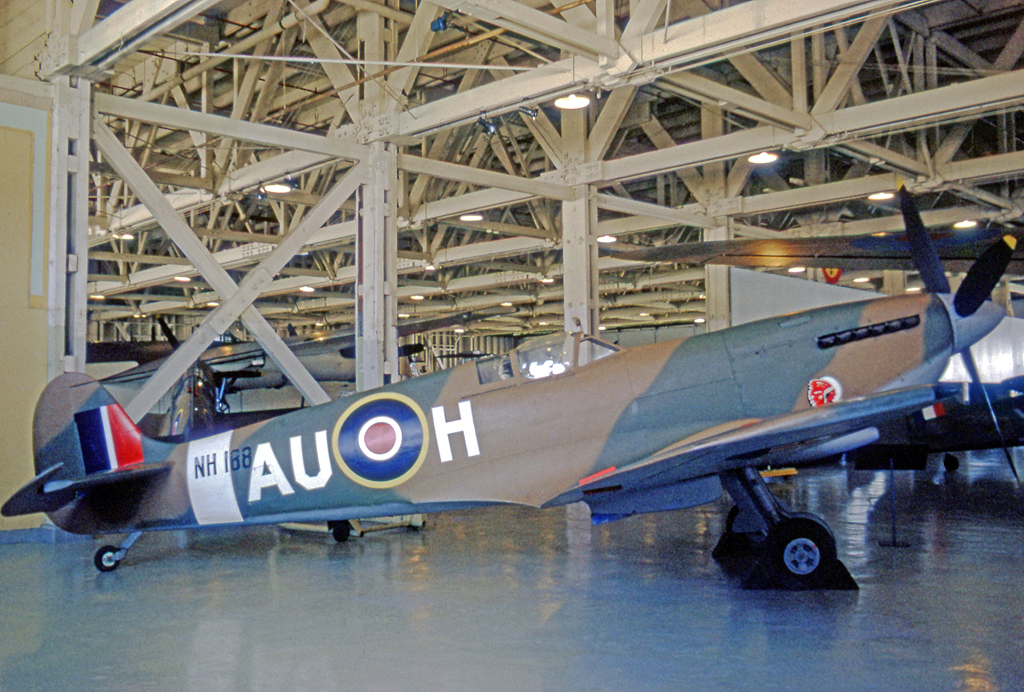
Supermarine Spitfire IX wearing the Red Indian markings and AU code of No. 421 Squadron on display at the Canada Aviation Museum at Rockcliffe Airport near Ottawa.

During 1942 the squadron was under 10 Group and flew its mission from RAF Warmwell, RAF Fairwood Common, RAF Bolt Head, RAF Ibsley, RAF Angle, RAF Zeals and RAF Charmy Down. In January 1943 the squadron joined the 127 (Canadian) Wing and moved to RAF Redhill. Late in spring of 1943 the squadron received Spitfire Mk IX and flew under the command of Wing Commander Johnnie Johnson.

In preparation for the Normandy landings the 127 Wing was assigned to RAF Second Tactical Air Force. On June 16 the squadron was along with the other squadrons of 127 Wing the first to be moved to Normandy and flew air superiority missions. After the allied breakout and quick advance towards the Reich 421 squadron was based in Advanced landing ground B-56 Evere in Belgium by October 1944. During December 1944 the squadron received Spitfire XVI. In 1945 the unit participated in the liberation of the Netherlands, before moving into Germany. At the end of the war the unit had achieved over 90 aerial victories.

== Postwar ==
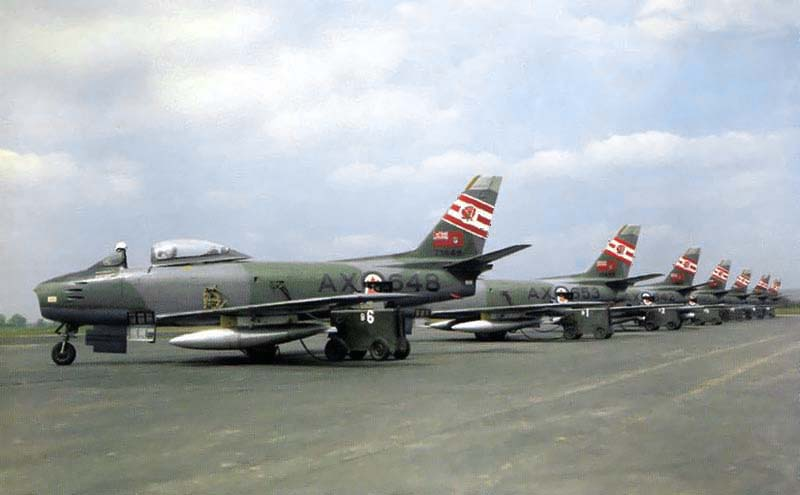
421 Squadron Sabres at RCAF Station Grostenquin France, 1957

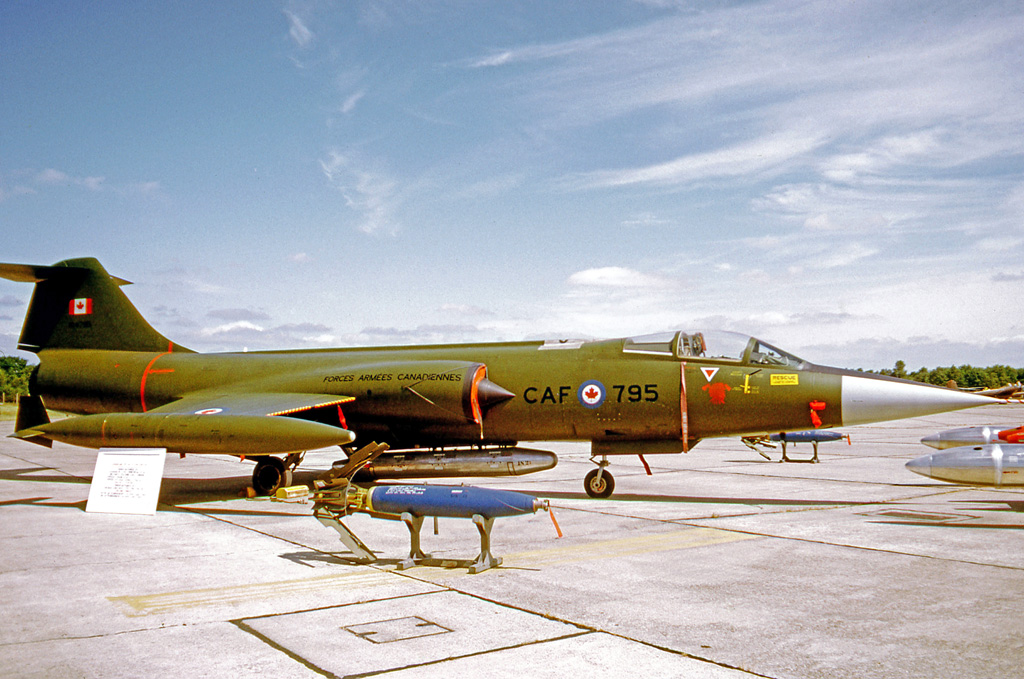
421 Squadron Canadair CF-104G Starfighter in 1973

Having been disbanded shortly after the war the squadron was re-activated on 15 September 1949 at Chatham flying Vampire aircraft. It moved overseas flying from RAF Odiham in the UK between January and November 1951. The squadron returned to Canada still flying Vampires from RCAF station St-Hubert until September 1952 when it returned overseas flying Canadair Sabres from Grostenquin, France. In 1962 it was equipped with CF-104 Starfighters and in 1967 the squadron moved to Zweibrücken becoming part of 1 Air Division RCAF (later renamed 1 Canadian Air Group) based at CFB Baden-Soellingen, West Germany. During the early 1980s it was equipped with CF-18 Hornets. At the end of the Cold War the squadron was disbanded and its aircraft and personnel returned to Canada.
