= Heinz Golinski =

German fighter ace and Knight's Cross recipient

- Born: 11 July 1919; Nordstemmen, Germany
- Died: 16 October 1942 (aged 23); Malta
- Cause of death: Killed in action
- Military career
- Allegiance: Nazi Germany
- Branch: Luftwaffe
- Service years: 1939–1942
- Rank: Feldwebel (sergeant)
- Unit: JG 53
- Conflicts: World War II: Eastern Front; Western Front
- Awards: Knight's Cross of the Iron Cross

Heinz Golinski (11 July 1919 – 16 October 1942) was a German fighter pilot in the Luftwaffe during World War II and a recipient of the Knight's Cross of the Iron Cross.

== Career ==
Golinski was born on 11 July 1919 in Nordstemmen and was posted as an Unteroffizier to 3./Jagdgeschwader 53 (JG 53) in the autumn of 1941, operating over the German Bight and over Malta. He then served as a test pilot with Messerschmitt. In August 1942, Golinski joined I./JG 53 on the Eastern Front. He claimed his first victory on 28 July 1942, an R-5 biplane. During August, he claimed 17 victories. Golinski claimed 27 victories in September. In late September, I./JG 53 transferred to the Mediterranean.

=== Malta and death ===
In October 1942, I. Gruppe of JG 53 relocated from the Eastern Front to Comiso Airfiled in Sicily where they arrived on 10 October. On 16 October, Golinski claimed a Supermarine Spitfire fighter shot down in a location 15 kilometers (9.3 miles) south of Ħal Far. His Messerschmitt Bf 109 G-2 trop (Werknummer 10582—factory number) was then shot down 10 kilometers (6.2 miles) south of Ħal Far, killing Golinski. It is thought Golinski was the victim of the Canadian fighter pilot F/L Henry Wallace "Wally" McLeod of No. 1435 Squadron RCAF. Prior to flying this fighter escort mission for seven Junkers Ju 88 bombers, Golinski had sprained an ankle and was unable to walk nor able to fly. When he reported this to his superior, he was accused of cowardice in the face of the enemy and forced to fly. Golinski's casualty report noted that after his Bf 109 was hit, it was observed that he made a half-role, then his right undercarriage came down before it went straight down and crashed. Posthumously, Golinski was awarded the German Cross in Gold (Deutsches Kreuz in Gold) on 5 November and the Knight's Cross of the Iron Cross (Ritterkreuz des Eisernen Kreuzes) on 30 December for his 47 aerial victories.

== Summary of career ==
=== Aerial victory claims ===
Spick states that Golinski had a mission-to-claim ratio of 3.19. Mathews and Foreman, authors of Luftwaffe Aces – Biographies and Victory Claims, researched the German Federal Archives and found records for 47 aerial victory claims plus. With the exception of a single aerial victories claimed over the Western Allies, all other aerial victories were claimed on the Eastern Front.

Victory claims were logged to a map-reference (PQ = Planquadrat), for example "PQ 1762". The Luftwaffe grid map (Jägermeldenetz) covered all of Europe, western Russia and North Africa and was composed of rectangles measuring 15 minutes of latitude by 30 minutes of longitude, an area of about 360 square miles (930 km^{2}). These sectors were then subdivided into 36 smaller units to give a location area 3 km × 4 km (1.9 mi × 2.5 mi) in size.

Chronicle of aerial victories
This and the ? (question mark) indicates information discrepancies listed by Prien, Stemmer, Rodeike, Bock, Mathews and Foreman.
Claim	Date	Time	Type	Location	Claim	Date	Time	Type	Location
– 3. Staffel of Jagdgeschwader 53 – Eastern Front — 28 May – 27 September 1942
1	28 July 1942	12:25	R-5	PQ 1762	25	9 September 1942	12:58	Yak-1	PQ 4079; 65 km (40 mi) north of Gumrak
2	29 July 1942	15:45	MiG-1	PQ 1711	26	9 September 1942	16:54? (Note: According to Mathews and Foreman claimed at 17:04.)	Il-2	PQ 4919; 15 km (9.3 mi) north of Grebenka
3	3 August 1942	10:55	Il-2	PQ 3919 vicinity of Kalach	27	10 September 1942	05:10	P-40	PQ 4944 vicinity of Stalingrad
4	3 August 1942	11:02	Il-2	PQ 3927 vicinity of Kalach	28	10 September 1942	08:40	Il-2	PQ 4927; 20 km (12 mi) southeast of Stalingrad
5	5 August 1942	09:38	Il-2	PQ 4957; 30 km (19 mi) north-northeast of Aksay	29	11 September 1942	16:20	Yak-1	PQ 5073; 10 km (6.2 mi) east of Stalingrad
6	8 August 1942	05:58	Il-2	PQ 4956; 45 km (28 mi) south of Stalingrad	30	12 September 1942	09:15	LaGG-3	PQ 4928; 80 km (50 mi) northeast of Stalingrad
7	8 August 1942	05:59	Il-2	PQ 4956; 45 km (28 mi) south of Stalingrad	31	12 September 1942	12:45	LaGG-3	PQ 4927; 25 km (16 mi) east of Stalingrad
8	12 August 1942	04:24	Il-2	PQ 2823	32	13 September 1942	09:30	Yak-1	PQ 49244; 15 km (9.3 mi) east of Stalingrad
9	13 August 1942	17:45	Il-2	PQ 3929 vicinity of Pitomnik	33	13 September 1942	09:33	Yak-1	PQ 40871; 10 km (6.2 mi) northeast of Stalingrad
10? (Note: This claim is not listed by Mathews and Foreman.)	14 August 1942	05:05	MiG-3		34	14 September 1942	10:22	LaGG-3	PQ 4945; 30 km (19 mi) northeast of Stalingrad
11	19 August 1942	08:55	R-5	PQ 49471	35	14 September 1942	16:48? (Note: According to Mathews and Foreman claimed at 16:47.)	LaGG-3	PQ 49413; 15 km (9.3 mi) southeast of Stalingrad
12	19 August 1942	15:26	Il-2	PQ 49294; 30 km (19 mi) south-southeast of Stalingrad	36	15 September 1942	10:32	La-5	PQ 4941; 20 km (12 mi) east of Stalingrad
13	22 August 1942	11:35	LaGG-3	PQ 5077, northeast of Rachinka; 35 km (22 mi) east of Stalingrad	37	16 September 1942	10:35	LaGG-3	PQ 49293; 15 km (9.3 mi) southeast of Stalingrad
14	22 August 1942	11:35? (Note: According to Mathews and Foreman claimed at 11:37.)	LaGG-3	PQ 5077, northeast of Rachinka; 50 km (31 mi) northeast of Stalingrad	? (Note: This claim is not listed by Prien, Stemmer, Rodeike and Bock.)	16 September 1942	10:35	LaGG-3	35 km (22 mi) east of Stalingrad
15	22 August 1942	17:22	MiG-3	PQ 5077, northeast of Rachinka; 50 km (31 mi) northeast of Stalingrad	38	16 September 1942	16:28	Pe-2	PQ 49424; 25 km (16 mi) east of Stalingrad
16	23 August 1942	10:17	U-2	PQ 5077, northeast of Rachinka; 50 km (31 mi) northeast of Stalingrad	39	18 September 1942	15:22	Yak-1	PQ 4078; 20 km (12 mi) north of Gumrak
17	23 August 1942	15:45	R-5	PQ 4922; 50 km (31 mi) northeast of Stalingrad	40	22 September 1942	07:40	Yak-1	PQ 4076; 10 km (6.2 mi) north of Grebenka
18	30 August 1942	05:29	Il-2	PQ 4921; 10 km (6.2 mi) east of Grebenka	41	22 September 1942	07:43	Yak-1	PQ 4075; 25 km (16 mi) north of Grebenka
19	30 August 1942	10:10	MiG-3	PQ 5935; 15 km (9.3 mi) northeast of Grebenka	42	23 September 1942	09:21	Yak-1	PQ 4075; 30 km (19 mi) north of Gumrak
20	2 September 1942	06:05	I-180 (Yak-7)	PQ 4989; 55 km (34 mi) east-southeast of Stalingrad	43	25 September 1942	06:25	Yak-1	PQ 49223; 25 km (16 mi) northeast of Stalingrad
21	2 September 1942	09:45	P-40	PQ 4949; 25 km (16 mi) south of Stalingrad	44	25 September 1942	09:42	Yak-1	PQ 49364; 35 km (22 mi) east of Stalingrad
22	6 September 1942	13:34	Il-2	PQ 4913; 50 km (31 mi) southeast of Stalingrad	45	25 September 1942	14:00	Yak-1	PQ 49263; 35 km (22 mi) east of Stalingrad
23	8 September 1942	12:05	Il-2	PQ 4943; 15 km (9.3 mi) north of Grebenka	46	25 September 1942	14:04	La-5	PQ 49261; 35 km (22 mi) east of Stalingrad
24	8 September 1942	16:37	Yak-1	PQ 4052; 40 km (25 mi) east-southeast of Stalingrad					
– 3. Staffel of Jagdgeschwader 53 – Eastern Front — Mediterranean Theater — 1–16 October 1942
47	16 October 1942	11:17	Spitfire	15 km (9.3 mi) south of Ħal Far					

=== Awards ===
- Iron Cross (1939) 2nd and 1st Class
- Honor Goblet of the Luftwaffe on 26 October 1942 as Unteroffizier and pilot
- German Cross in Gold on 5 November 1942 as Unteroffizier in the I./Jagdgeschwader 53
- Knight's Cross of the Iron Cross on 30 December 1942 (posthumous) as Unteroffizier and pilot in the 3./Jagdgeschwader 53 (Note: According to Scherzer as pilot in the I./Jagdgeschwader 53.)
