= Bazenville =

- Commune
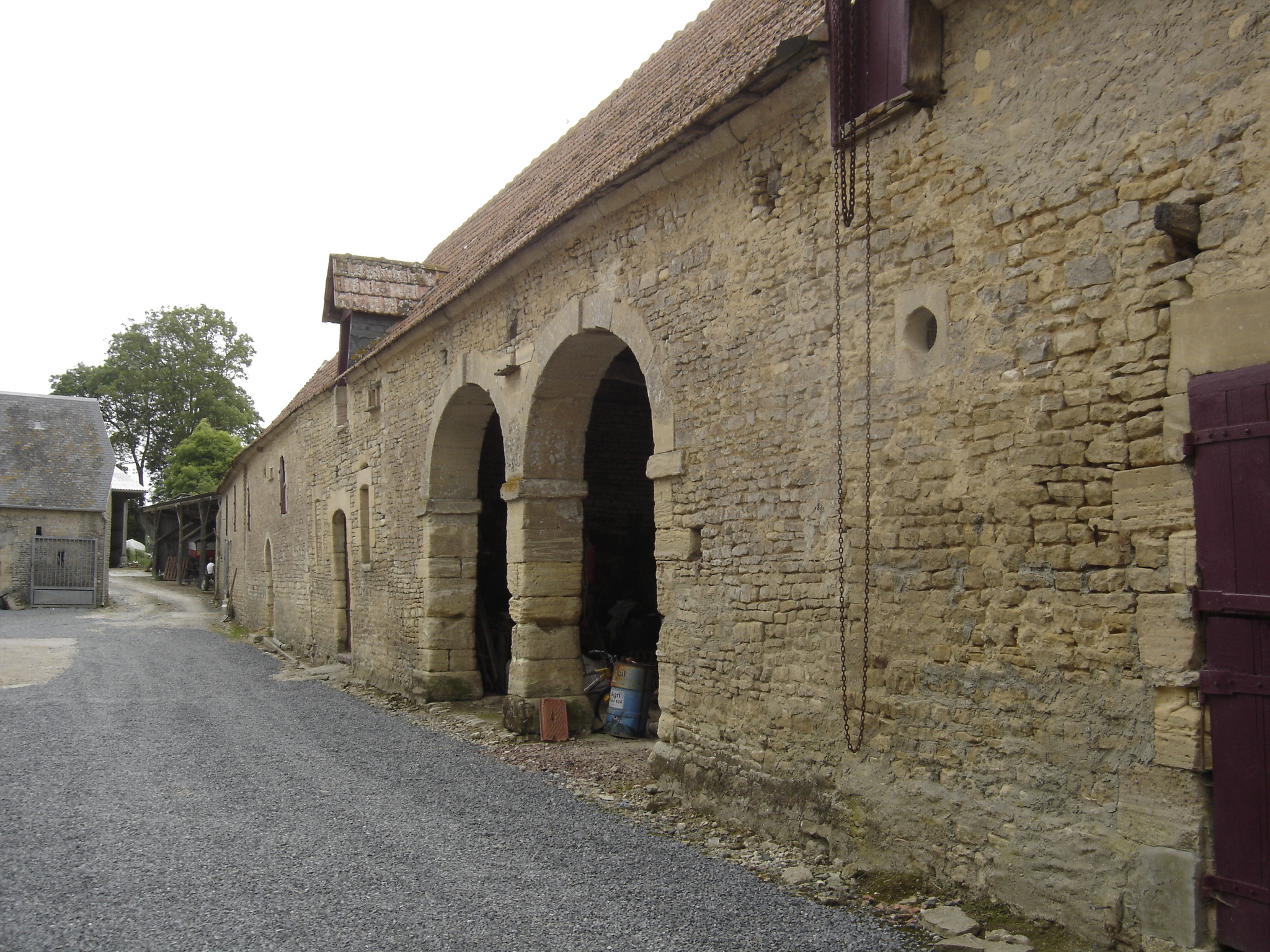
- An old barn in Bazenville

- Coat of arms
- Location of Bazenville
- Location within France Location within Normandy
- Coordinates: 49°18′13″N 0°35′06″W
- Country: France
- Region: Normandy
- Department: Calvados
- Arrondissement: Bayeux
- Canton: Courseulles-sur-Mer
- Intercommunality: CC Seulles Terre Mer

Government
  - Mayor (2020–2026): Marcel Dubois
- Area^{1}: 4.07 km^{2} (1.57 sq mi)
- Elevation: 30 m (98 ft)
- Highest elevation: 67 m (220 ft)
- Lowest elevation: 53 m (174 ft)
- Population (2023): 142
  - Density: 34.9/km^{2} (90.4/sq mi)
- Time zone: UTC+01:00 (CET)
  - Summer (DST): UTC+02:00 (CEST)
- INSEE/Postal code: 14049 /14480
- ^{1} French Land Register data, which excludes lakes, ponds, glaciers > 1 km^{2} (0.386 sq mi or 247 acres) and river estuaries.

Bazenville (French pronunciation: [bazɑ̃vil]) is a commune in the Calvados department in the Normandy region of north-western France.

Bazenville Airfield was a former World War II Advanced Landing Ground, mostly located outside the commune of Bazenville 1.8 km to the north-east.

The inhabitants of the commune are known as Bazenvillais or Bazenvillaises.

== Geography ==
Bazenville is located some 6 km east by north-east of Bayeux and 4 km south by south-east of Arromanches-les-Bains. Access to the commune is by the D87 road from Ryes in the north-west which passes through the commune south of the village and continues south-east to Villiers-le-Sec. The D112 from Sommervieu to Crépon forms the north-western border of the commune. Apart from the village there is the hamlet of Les Noyaux. There is a British Military Cemetery in the west of the commune on the D87. The commune is entirely farmland.

== Toponymy ==
Bazonille is mentioned as Basonni villa in 875.

Bazenville appears as Bazanville on the 1750 Cassini Map and as Bazan ville on the 1790 version.

== History ==
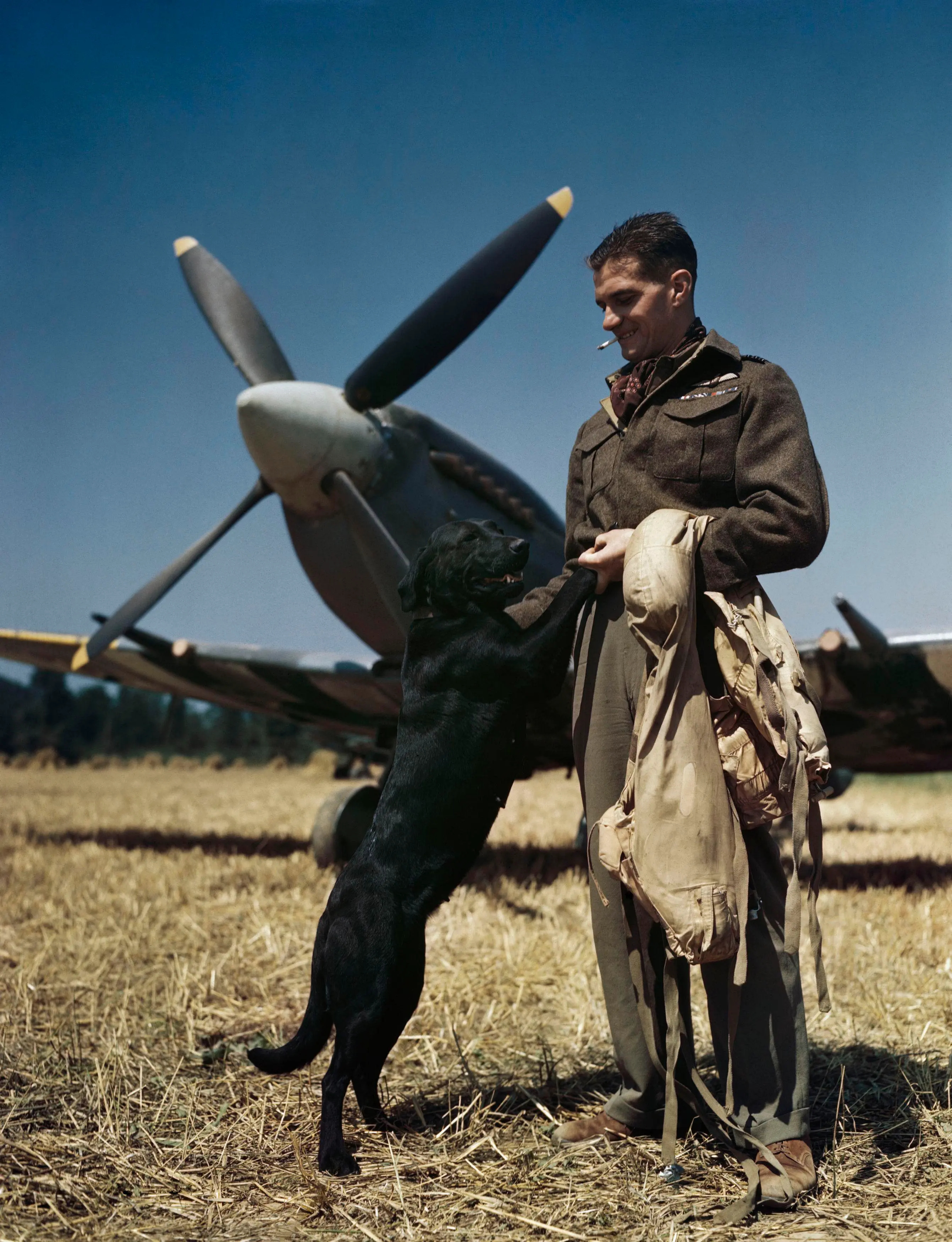
Wing Commander James "Johnny" Johnson at Bazenville Normandy 31 July 1944

Bazenville was liberated on the same day as the Normandy landings on 6 June 1944. An interim Canadian aerodrome (referred to as Bazenville Airfield, Advanced Landing Ground B-2 Bazenville, or B-2 Crépon) was built commencing the following night near the commune in a large part of the triangle formed by the Bazenville, Crépon, and Villiers-le-Sec villages.

It was on this aerodrome that the French ace Pierre Clostermann flew, on 11 June 1944, for the first time in France after his entry into the war in 1942: "All my life I will remember the people of Bazenville the first French to whom I spoke".

== Administration ==
List of Successive Mayors

From	To	Name	Party	Position
2001	2005	Pierre Vallerend		Farmer
2005	2026	Marcel Dubois		Retired

== Demography ==
Historical population

Year	Pop.	±% p.a.
1793	381	—
1821	409	+0.25%
1846	362	−0.49%
1872	291	−0.84%
1901	216	−1.02%
1926	153	−1.37%
1946	192	+1.14%
1954	177	−1.01%
1962	196	+1.28%

Year	Pop.	±% p.a.
1968	177	−1.69%
1975	149	−2.43%
1982	164	+1.38%
1990	145	−1.53%
1999	144	−0.08%
2007	146	+0.17%
2012	145	−0.14%
2017	137	−1.13%
2023	142	+0.60%

Source: EHESS and INSEE

== Culture and heritage ==
=== Civil heritage ===
- A Commemorative plaque remembering the site of the airfield where Pierre Clostermann arrived on 11 June 1944.

The commune has many buildings and sites that are registered as historical monuments:

- A Farmhouse at Rue des Alliés (1759)
- A Tradesman's house at Rue des Cordiers (19th century)
- The Bazenville Farmhouse at Rue de l'Eglise (17th century)
- A House at Rue de l'Eglise (18th century)
- A Notable's House at Rue de l'Eglise (18th century)
- The Chateau of Bazenville at Rue de la Grotte (17th century)
- The Manor of Tournebu at Rue des Noyaux (17th century)
- A Worker's House at Route de Villiers-le-Sec (19th century)
- The Chateau de la Croix at Route de Villiers-le-Sec (1727)
- The British Cemetery of Ryes (20th century). The cemetery contains 979 graves: 630 British, 21 Canadians, one Australian, one Pole, and 326 Germans.
- The War Memorial (1929)
- The Grotto of Lourdes (1947)
- Bazenville Village (Ancient times)
- Houses (17th-19th century)

=== Religious heritage ===
The commune has several religious buildings and sites that are registered as historical monuments:

- A Presbytery at Rue de l'Eglise (19th century)
- The Parish Church of Saint-Martin at le Bourg (13th century) The Church contains a large number of objects which are registered as historical objects.

=== Heritage Picture Gallery ===
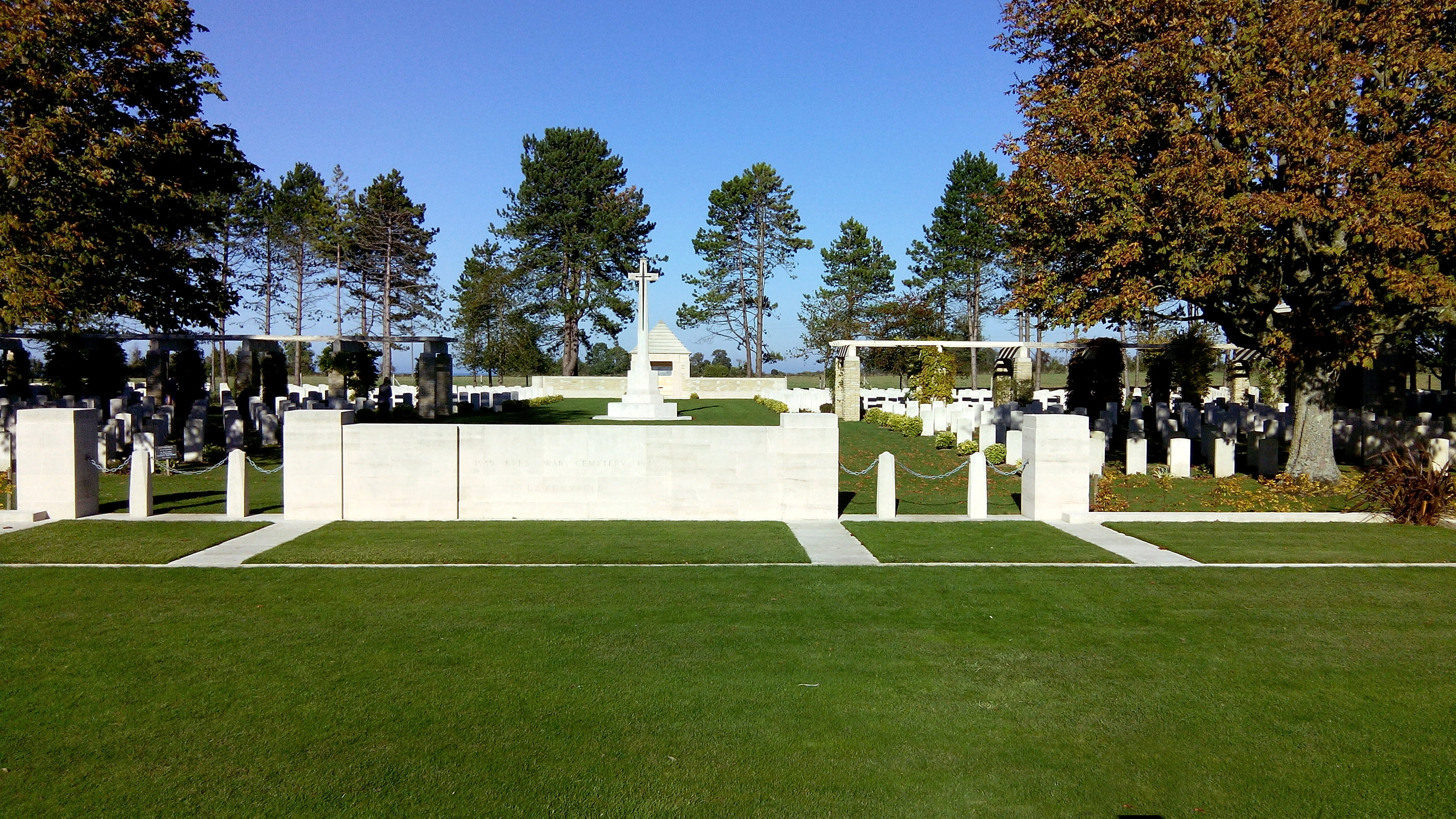
The British Military Cemetery in Bazenville

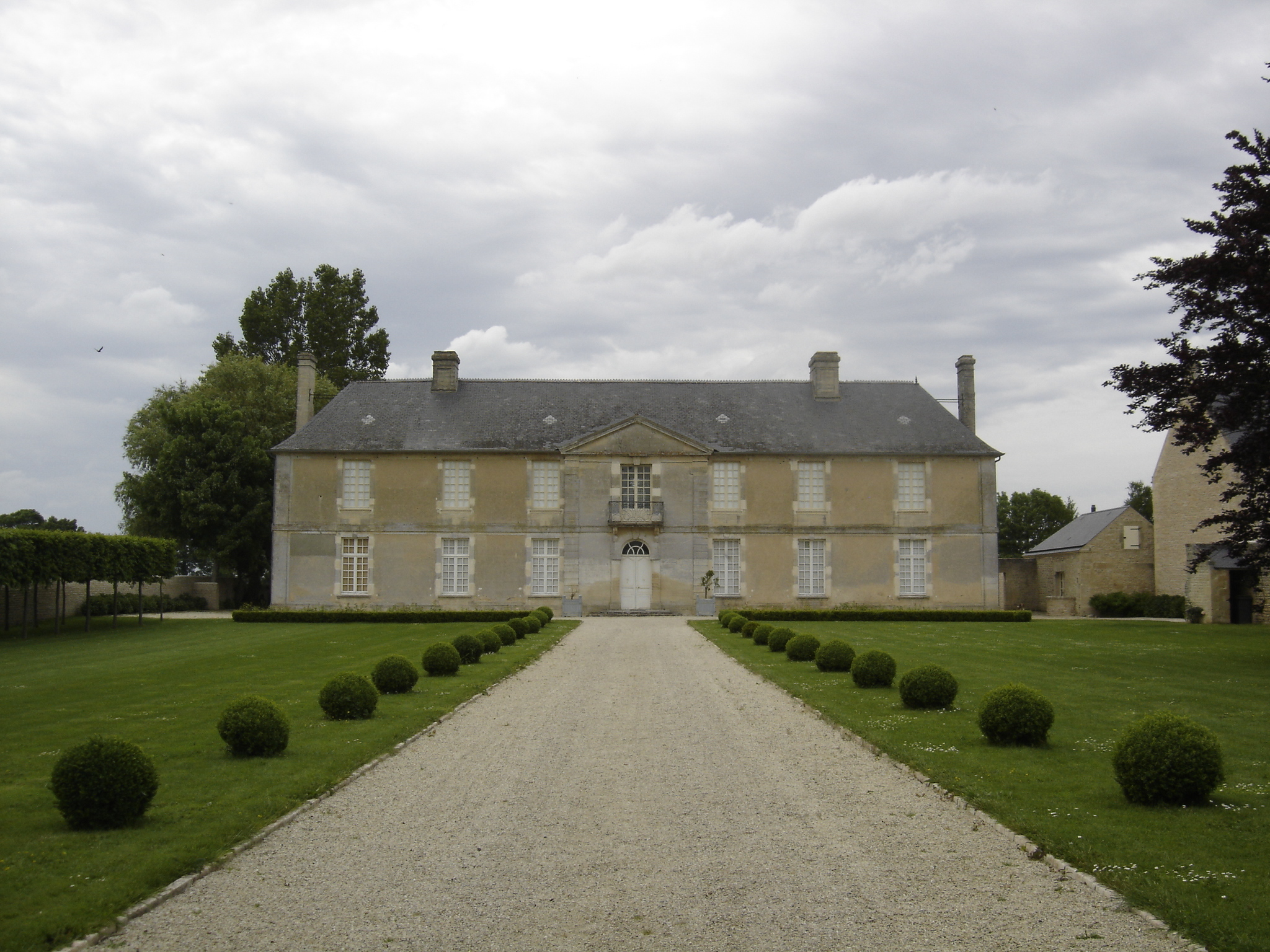
The Chateau of Bazenville

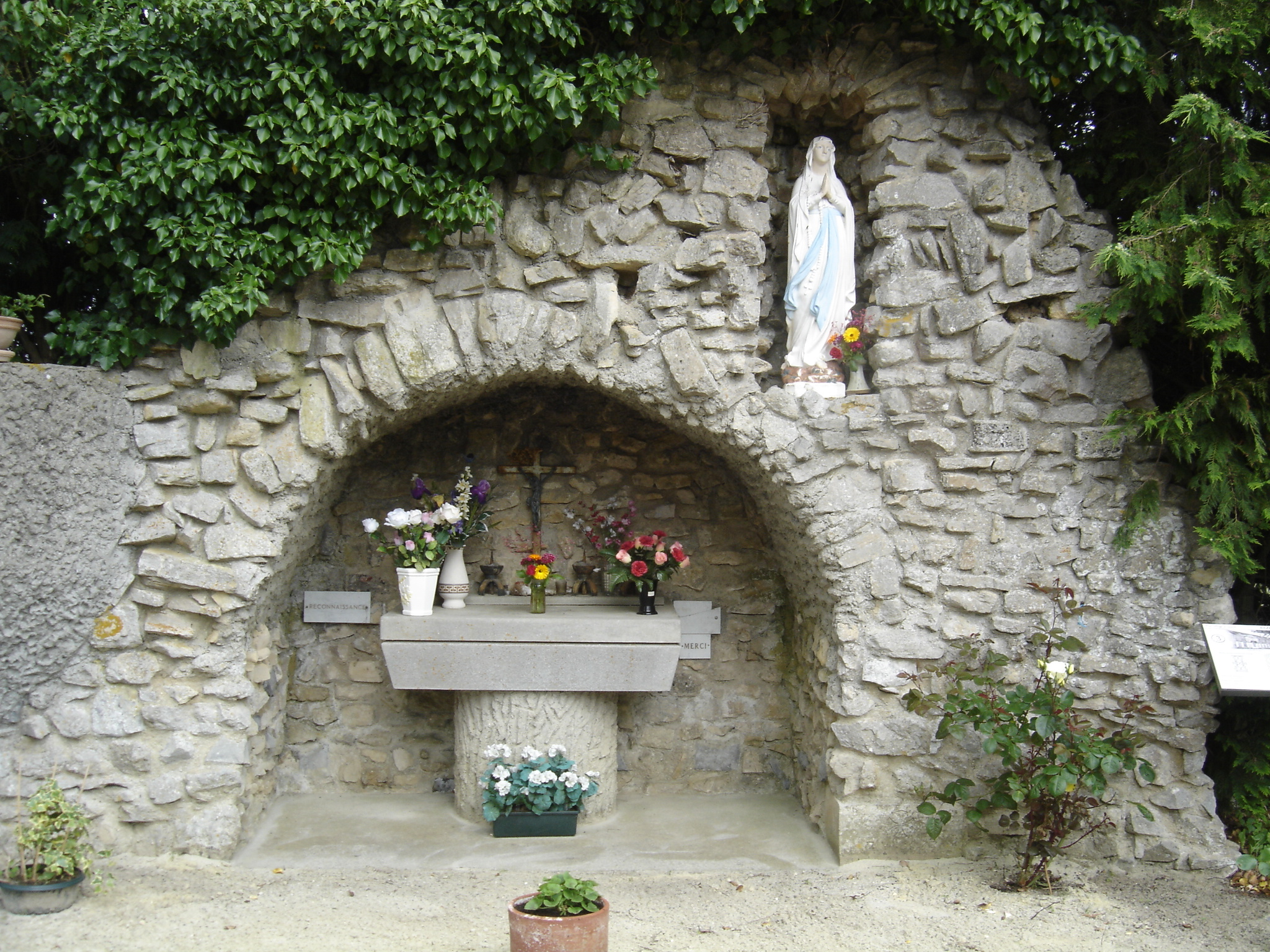
The Grotto of Lourdes

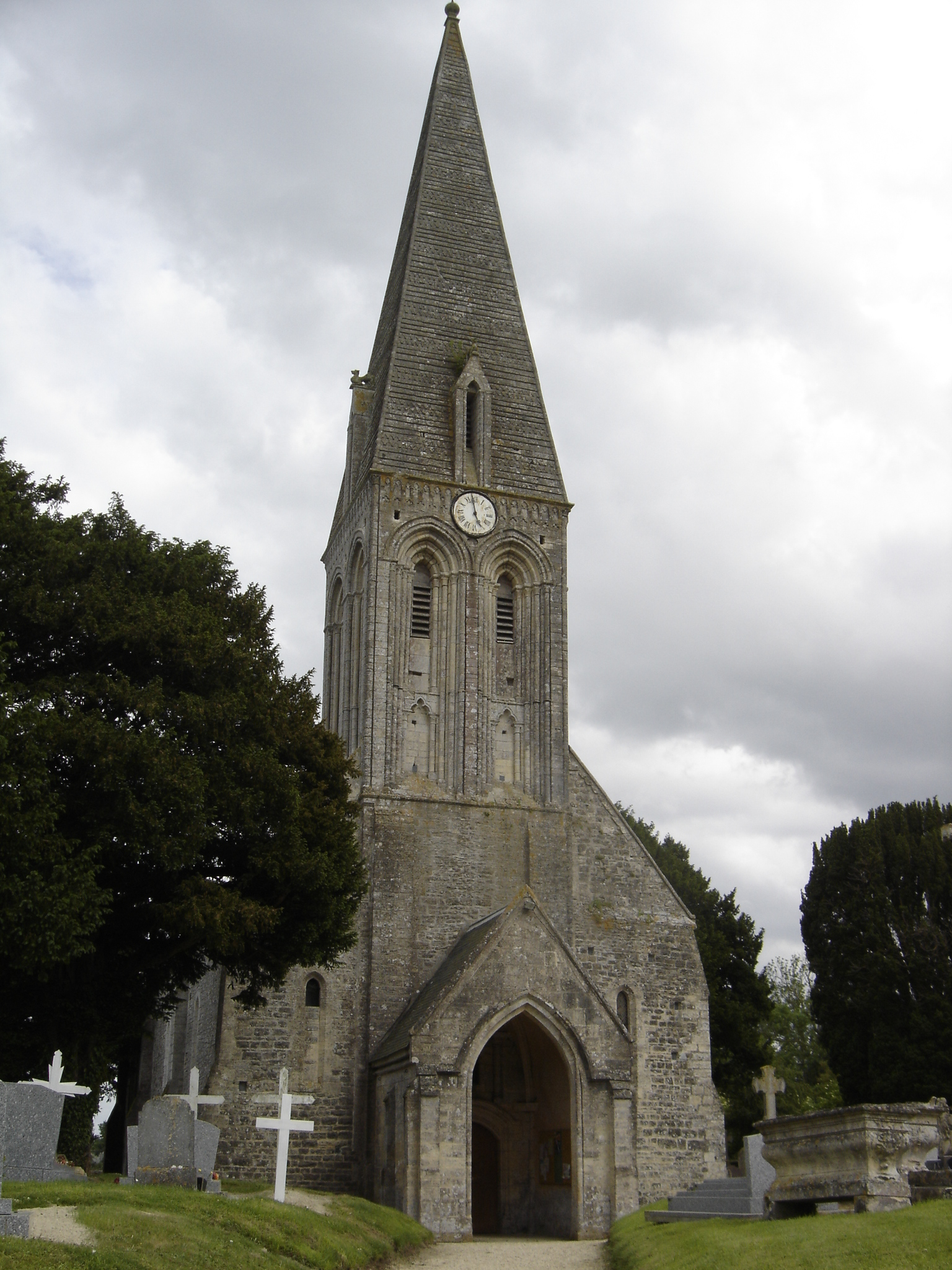
The Church of Saint Martin

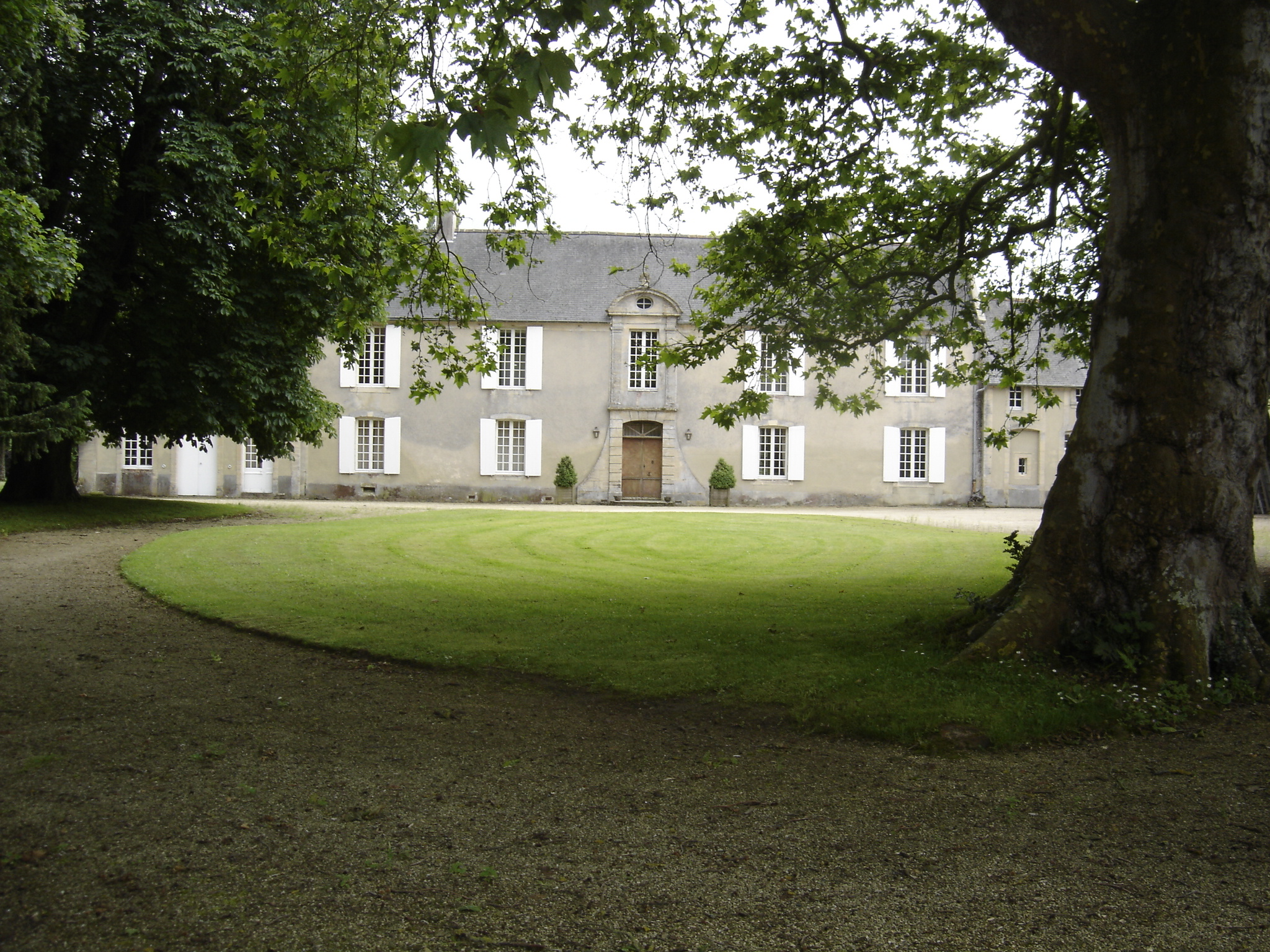
The Chateau de la Croix

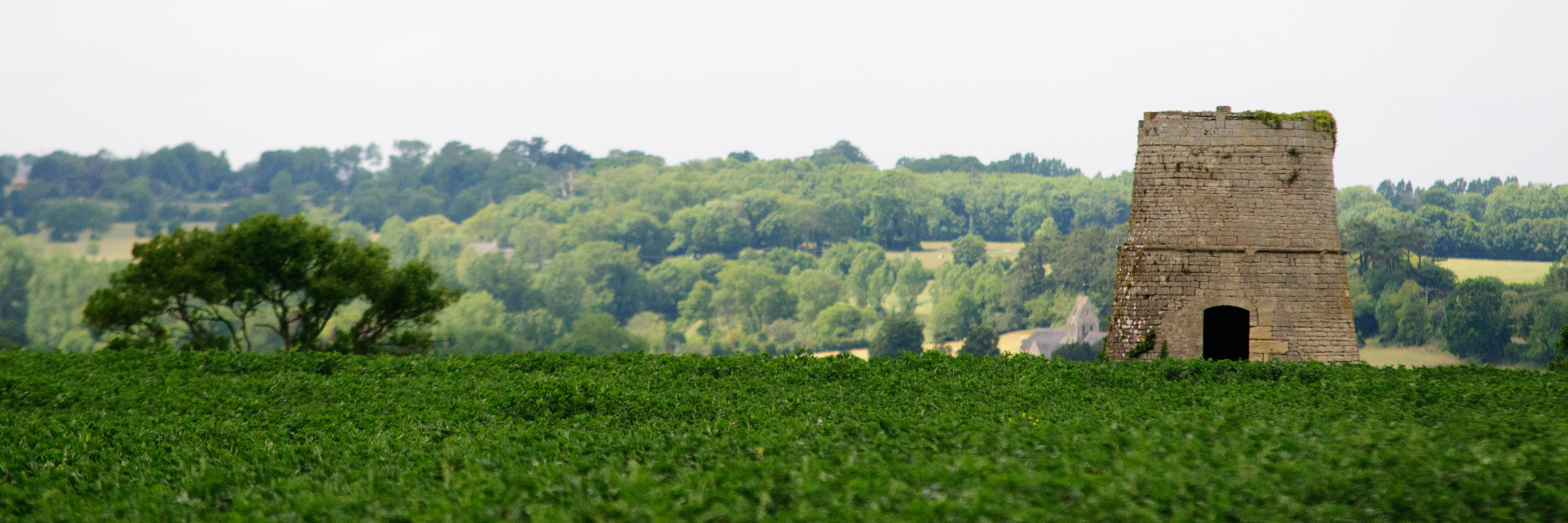
The War Cemetery

== Notable people linked to the commune ==
- Antoine Halley, born in 1593 at Bazenville died in 1675, poet.

== See also ==
- Communes of the Calvados department
