= No. 127 Wing RAF =

No. 127 Wing RAF No. 127 (RCAF) (Fighter) Wing RAF No. 127 Airfield Headquarters RAF
- Country: United Kingdom
- Branch: Royal Air Force
- Role: Air supremacy
- Size: wing
- Part of: No. 11 Group RAF; RAF Second Tactical Air Force (2 TAF)
- Garrison/HQ: RAF Kenley; RAF Tangmere

Commanders
- Notable commanders: Hugh Constant Godefroy; J.E. Johnson; Lloyd Chadburn

Aircraft flown
- Attack: Hawker Typhoon
- Fighter: Supermarine Spitfire Mk.IX

No. 127 Wing RAF was a formation of the Royal Air Force during the Second World War. It comprised No. 403 Squadron RCAF, No. 416 Squadron RCAF and No. 443 Squadron RCAF.

== History ==
127 Wing, or the 'Kenley Wing', based at RAF Kenley, was led by Wing Commander 'Johnnie' Johnson from Spring to September 1943, and he returned to command it during the Normandy Campaign.

On 5 June 1944 the wing was based at RAF Tangmere and consisted of 403, 416, and 421 Squadron's

== See also ==
- List of wings of the Royal Air Force
