= Johnnie Johnson (RAF officer, born 1915) =

RAF flying ace in the Second World War

Air Vice-Marshal Johnnie Johnson CB CBE DSO** DFC* DL
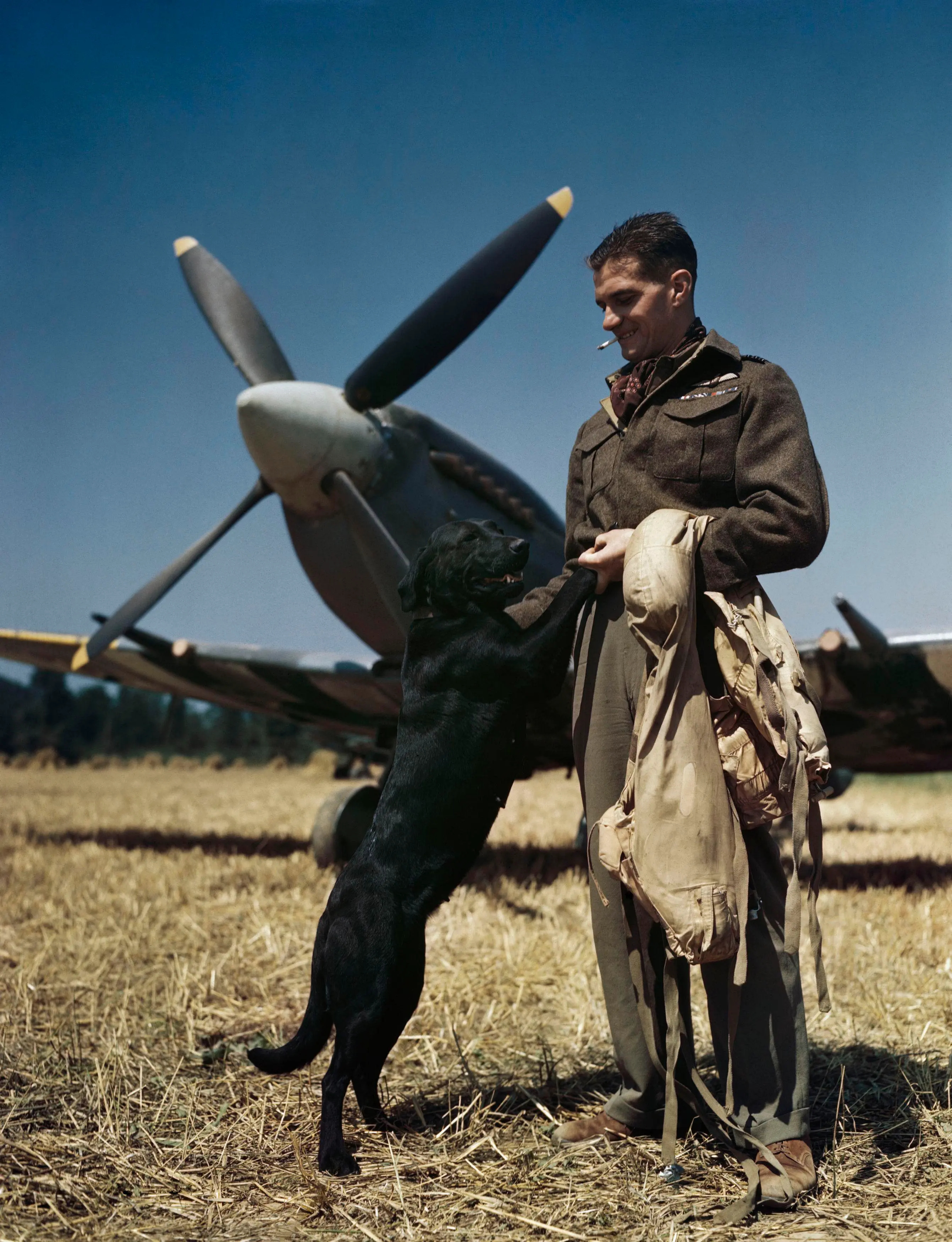
- Johnson in 1944, with his Labrador, Sally
- Born: 9 March 1915; Barrow upon Soar, Leicestershire
- Died: 30 January 2001 (aged 85); Buxton, Derbyshire
- Military career
- Allegiance: United Kingdom
- Branch: Royal Air Force
- Service years: 1939–1966
- Rank: Air Vice-Marshal
- Nickname: "Johnnie"
- Service number: 754750 (airman); 83267 (officer)
- Commands: No. 610 Squadron (1942–43); No. 144 Wing (1944); No. 127 Wing (1944–45); No. 125 Wing (1945); No. 124 Wing (1945–46); RAF Wildenrath (1952–54); RAF Cottesmore (1957–59); Air Forces Middle East (1963–65)
- Conflicts: Second World War; Korean War
- Awards: Companion of the Order of the Bath; Commander of the Order of the British Empire; Distinguished Service Order & Two Bars; Distinguished Flying Cross & Bar; Officer of the Order of Leopold with Palms (Belgium); Croix de guerre (Belgium); Legion of Merit (US); Distinguished Flying Cross (US); Air Medal (US); Commander of the Legion of Honour (France)
- Other work: Deputy lieutenant for the County of Leicestershire

Air Vice-Marshal James Edgar Johnson (9 March 1915 – 30 January 2001), nicknamed "Johnnie", was an English Royal Air Force (RAF) pilot and flying ace who flew and fought during the Second World War.

Johnson grew up and was educated in the East Midlands, where he qualified as an engineer. A sportsman, Johnson broke his collarbone while playing rugby, an injury that later complicated his ambitions of becoming a fighter pilot. Johnson had been interested in aviation since his youth and applied to join the RAF. He was initially rejected, first on social, and then on medical grounds; he was eventually accepted in August 1939. The injury problems, however, returned during his early training and flying career, resulting in his missing the Battle of France and the Battle of Britain between May and October 1940.

In 1940 Johnson had an operation to reset his collarbone, and began flying regularly. He took part in the offensive sweeps over German-occupied Europe from 1941 to 1944, almost without rest. Johnson was involved in heavy aerial fighting during this period. His combat tour included participation in the Dieppe Raid, Combined Bomber Offensive, Battle of Normandy, Operation Market Garden, the Battle of the Bulge and the Western Allied invasion of Germany. Johnson progressed to the rank of group captain by the end of the war.

Johnson was credited with 34 individual victories over enemy aircraft, as well as seven shared victories, three shared probable, ten damaged, three shared damaged and one destroyed on the ground. Johnson flew 700 operational sorties and engaged enemy aircraft on 57 occasions. Included in his list of individual victories were 14 Messerschmitt Bf 109s and 20 Focke-Wulf Fw 190s destroyed making him the most successful RAF ace against the Fw 190. This score made him the highest scoring Western Allied fighter ace against the German Luftwaffe. (Note: Only Marmaduke Pattle claimed more victories—around 50—but over half of his claims were made against the Italian Regia Aeronautica (Italian Royal Air Force).)

Johnson continued his career in the RAF after the war, and served in the Korean War before retiring in 1966 with the rank of air vice marshal. He maintained an interest in aviation and did public speaking on the subject as well as entering into the business of aviation art. Johnnie Johnson remained active until his death from cancer in 2001.

== Early life ==
Johnson was born 9 March 1915 in Barrow upon Soar, Leicestershire, to Alfred Johnson and Beatrice May Johnson. He lived and was brought up in Melton Mowbray, where his father was a policeman. Alfred Johnson was an inspector by the mid-1930s. One evening Oswald Mosley, the leader of the British Union of Fascists, held a meeting in the town. The licence for the meeting expired at 10 p.m. at which time Alfred Johnson went alone and ejected the Fascists from the building.

Johnson was educated at Camden Street Junior School and Loughborough Grammar School. Johnson's uncle, Edgar Charles Rossell, who had won the Military Cross with the Royal Fusiliers in 1916, paid for Johnson's education at Loughborough. According to his brother Ross, during his time there, Johnson was nearly expelled after refusing punishment for a misdemeanour, believing it to be unjustified: "he was very principled and simply dug his heels in". Among Johnson's hobbies and interests were shooting and sports; he shot rabbits and birds in the local countryside.

Johnson attended the University College Nottingham (later the University of Nottingham), where he qualified as a civil engineer, aged 22. Johnson became a surveyor at Melton Mowbray Urban District Council before progressing to assistant engineer with Chigwell Urban District Council at Loughton. In 1938, Johnson broke his collarbone playing rugby for Chingford Rugby Club; the injury was wrongly set and did not heal properly, which later caused him difficulty at the start of his flying career.

== Joining the RAF ==
Johnson started taking flying lessons at his own expense. He applied to join the Auxiliary Air Force (AAF) but encountered some of the social problems that were rife in British society. Johnson felt he was rejected on the grounds of his class status. Johnson's fortunes were to improve. The prospect of war increased in the aftermath of the Munich Crisis, and the criteria for applicants changed as the RAF expanded and brought in men from ordinary social backgrounds. Johnson re-applied to the AAF. He was informed that sufficient pilots were already available but there were some vacancies in the balloon squadrons. Johnson rejected the offer.

Inspired by some Chingford friends who had joined, Johnson applied again to join the Royal Air Force Volunteer Reserve (RAFVR). The RAFVR was a means to enter the RAF for young men with ordinary backgrounds. All volunteer aircrew were made sergeant on joining with the possibility of a commission. Once again he was rejected, this time on the grounds that there were too many applicants for vacancies and his injury made him unsuitable for flight operations. His ambition frustrated, Johnson joined the Leicestershire Yeomanry, where the injury was not a bar to recruitment. He joined the Territorial Army unit because, though he was in a reserved occupation, if war came, he had "no intention of seeing out the duration building air raid shelters or supervising decontamination squads". Johnson was content in the Yeomanry. One day while riding through Burghley, near Stamford, on annual camp Johnson took a detour to RAF Wittering nearby (now in Cambridgeshire.) Upon seeing a line of Hawker Hurricane fighters Johnson remarked "If I've got to fight Hitler I'd sooner fight him in one of those than on a bloody great horse!".

=== Flight training ===
In August 1939, Johnson was finally accepted by the RAFVR and began training at weekends at the airfield at Stapleford Tawney, a satellite airfield of RAF North Weald. There he received ground instruction on airmanship. Taught by retired service pilots of 21 Elementary & Reserve Flying Training School, Johnson trained on the de Havilland Tiger Moth biplane. Upon the outbreak of war in September 1939, with the rank of sergeant, Johnson entrained for Cambridge. He arrived at the 2nd Initial Training Wing to begin flight instruction. He was interviewed by senior officers in which he said his profession and knowledge of topography, surveying and mapping would make him more useful in a reconnaissance role. The wing commander agreed, but nonetheless, Johnson was selected for fighter pilot training and given the service number 754750 with the rank of sergeant. While assigned here Johnson learned basic military drill, sometimes given the slang name "square bashing".

By December 1939, Johnson began his initial training at 22 EFTS (Elementary Flying Training School), Cambridge. He flew only three times in December 1939 and eight in January 1940, all as second pilot. On 29 February 1940, Johnson flew solo for the first time in Tiger Moth N6635. On 15 March and 24 April, he passed a 50-minute flight test followed by two night flights the following day. The chief flying instructor passed him on 6 May. He then moved to 5 FTS at Sealand before completing training at 7 OTU (Operational Training Unit) – RAF Hawarden in Wales. He he flew the Miles Master N7454 and earned his instrument, navigation, night-flying ratings and practised forced landings. After his training was complete on 7 August 1940, Johnson received his "wings" and was inducted into the General Duties Branch of the RAF as a pilot officer with 55 hours and 5 minutes solo flying.

On 19 August 1940, Johnson flew a Spitfire for the first time. Over the next weeks he practised handling, formation flying, attacks, battle climbs, aerobatics and dogfighting. During his training flights, he stalled and crashed a Spitfire. Johnson had his harness straps on too loose, and wrenched his shoulders – revealing that his earlier rugby injury had not healed properly. The Spitfire did a ground loop, ripping off one of the undercarriage legs and forcing the other up through the port main plane. The commanding officer (CO) excused Johnson, for the short airfield was difficult to land on for an inexperienced pilot. Johnson got the impression, however, that he would be watched closely, and felt that if he made another mistake, he would be "certainly washed out". Johnson tried to pack the injured shoulder with wool, held in place by adhesive tape. He also tightened the straps to reduce vibrations while flying. The measures proved useless and Johnson found he had lost feeling in his right hand. When he dived the pressure aggravated his shoulder. He often tried to fly using his left hand only, but Spitfires had to be handled with both hands during anything other than simple manoeuvres. Despite the difficulties with his injuries, on 28 August 1940, the course was complete. Johnson had 205.25 hours on operational types including 23.50 on the Spitfire.

After training, in August 1940, he was briefly posted to No. 19 Squadron as a probationary pilot officer. Due to equipment difficulties, 19 Squadron were unable to complete Johnson's training and he left the unit. On 6 September 1940 Johnson was posted to No. 616 Squadron at RAF Coltishall. Squadron Leader H.L "Billy" Burton took Johnson on a 50-minute training flight in X4055. After the flight Burton impressed upon Johnson the difficulties of deflection shooting and the technique of a killing shot from line-astern or near line-astern positions; the duty of the number two whose job was not to shoot down enemy aircraft but to ensure the leader's tail was safe. Burton also directed Johnson to some critical tactical essentials; the importance of keeping good battle formation and the tactical use of sun, cloud and height. Five days later, Johnson flew an X-Raid patrol in Spitfire X4330, qualifying for the Battle of Britain clasp.

Johnson's old injury continued to trouble him and he found flying high performance aircraft like the Spitfire extremely painful. RAF medics gave him two options; he could have an operation that would correct the problem, but this meant he would miss the Battle of Britain, or becoming a training instructor flying the light Tiger Moth. Johnson opted for the operation. He had hoped for discreet treatment, but word soon reached the CO, and Johnson was taken off flying duties and sent to the RAF hospital at Rauceby. He did not return to the squadron until 28 December 1940. CO Burton took Johnson up for a test flight on 31 December 1940 in Miles Magister L8151. After the 45-minute flight, Johnson's fitness to fly was approved.

== Second World War ==
Johnson returned to operational flying in early 1941 in 616 Squadron, which was forming part of the Tangmere Wing. Johnson often found himself flying alongside Wing Commander Douglas Bader and Australian ace Tony Gaze.

On 15 January 1941, Johnson, the recently appointed Squadron Leader Burton, and Pilot Officer Hugh Dundas took off to offer cover for a convoy off North Cotes. The controller vectored the pair onto an enemy aircraft, a Dornier Do 17. Both attacked the bomber and lost sight of it and each other. Although the controllers intercepted distress signals from the bomber Johnson did not see it crash. They were credited with one enemy aircraft damaged. It was the only time Johnson was to engage a German bomber. By the end of January, Johnson had added another 16.35 flying hours on Spitfires.

In the opening months of 1941, Johnson flew as a night fighter pilot. Using day fighters to act as night fighters without radar was largely unsuccessful in intercepting German bombers during the Blitz; Johnson's only action occurred on 22 February 1941 when he damaged a Messerschmitt Bf 110 in Spitfire R6611, QJ-F. A week later, Johnson's squadron was moved to RAF Tangmere on the Channel coast. Johnson was eager to see combat after just 10.40 operational hours and welcomed the prospect of meeting the enemy from Tangmere. If the Germans did not resume their assault the wing was to take the fight to them.

In November 1940 Air Marshal Sholto Douglas became Air Officer Commanding (AOC) RAF Fighter Command. On 8 December 1940 a directive from the Air Staff called for "Sector Offensive Sweeps". It ordered hit-and-run operations over Belgium and France. The operations were to be conducted by three squadrons to harass German air defences. On 10 January 1941 Circus attacks were initiated by sending small bomber formations protected by large numbers of fighters. The escalation of offensive operations throughout 1941 was designed to draw up the Luftwaffe as Douglas' command took an increasingly offensive stance. These operations became known as the Circus offensive. Trafford Leigh-Mallory, AOC 11 Group, penned Operations Instruction No. 7, which he had written on 16 February. Leigh-Mallory outlined six distinct operations for day fighters: Ramrod (bomber escort with primary goal the destruction of the target); Fighter Ramrod (the same goal where fighters escorted ground-attack fighters); Roadstead (bomber escort and anti-shipping operations); Fighter Roadstead (the same operation as Roadstead but without bombers) along with Rhubarb (poor weather ground attack operation) and Circus operations. (Note: see Glossary of RAF code names)

=== Circus offensives ===
Johnson's first contact with enemy single-engine fighters did not go as planned. Bader undertook a patrol with Dundas as his number two. Johnson followed in his section as number three with Whaley "Nip" Heppell guarding his tail as Red Four. Johnson spotted three Bf 109s a few hundred feet higher and travelling in the same direction. Johnson, forgetting to calmly report the number, type and position of the enemy, shouted, "Look out Dogsbody!" (Bader's call sign). Such a call was only to be used if the pilot in question was in imminent danger of being attacked. The section broke in all directions and headed to Tangmere singly. The mistake brought an embarrassing rebuke from Bader at the debriefing.

Johnson flew various operations over France including the Rhubarb ground attack missions which Johnson hated—he considered it a waste of pilots. Several successful fighter pilots had been lost this way. Flight Lieutenant Eric Lock and Wing Commander Paddy Finucane were killed on Rhubarb operations in August 1941 and July 1942 respectively. Squadron leader Robert Stanford Tuck would be captured carrying out a similar operation in January 1942. During this time, Dundas and other pilots also expressed dissatisfaction with the formation tactics being used in the wing. After a long conversation into the early hours, Bader accepted the suggestions by his senior pilots and agreed to the use of more flexible tactics to lessen the chances of being taken by surprise. The tactical changes involved operating overlapping line abreast formations similar to the German finger-four formation. The tactics were used thereafter by all RAF pilots in the wing.

The first use of these tactics by the Tangmere Wing was used on 6 May 1941. The wing engaged Bf 109Fs from Jagdgeschwader 51 (Fighter Wing 51), led by Werner Mölders. Noticing the approaching Germans below and behind them, the Spitfires feigned ignorance. Waiting for the optimum moment to turn the tables, Bader called for them to break, and whip around behind the Bf 109s. Unfortunately for the Tangmere Wing, while the tactic had been successful in avoiding a surprise attack, the break was mistimed. It left some Bf 109s still behind the Spitfires. In the battle that followed the wing shot down one Bf 109 and damaged another, although Dundas was shot down for the second time in his career—and once again by Mölders, who had remained behind the British. Dundas was able to nurse his crippled fighter back to base and crash-land.

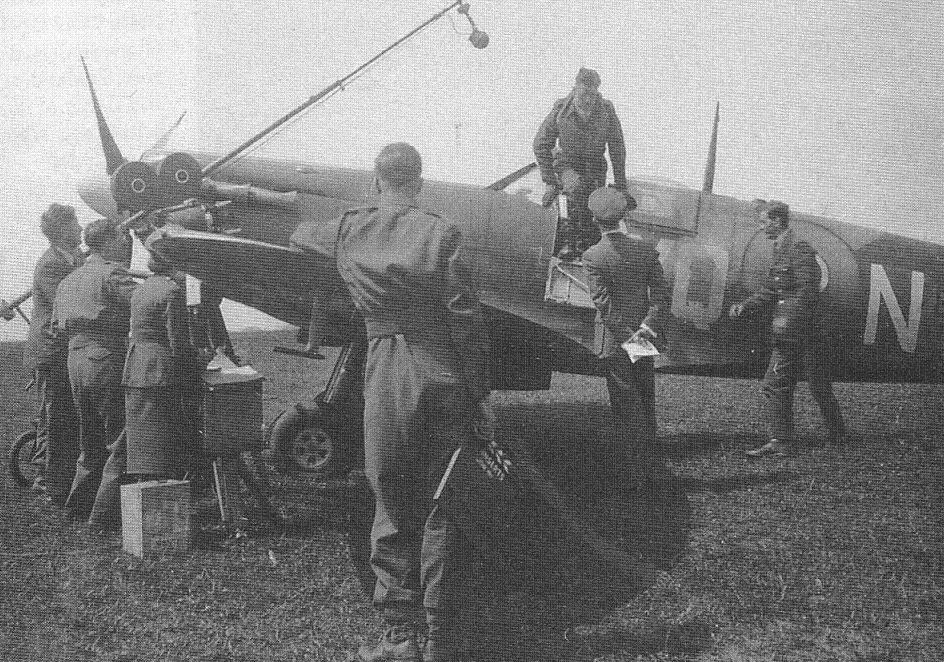
Johnson climbs out of the cockpit before waiting media, RAF Kings Cliffe, 1942

One month later, Johnson gained his first air victory. On 26 June Johnson participated in Circus 24. Crossing the coast near Gravelines, Bader warned of 24 Bf 109s nearby, southeast, in front of the wing. The Bf 109s saw the British and turned to attack the lower No. 610 Squadron from the rear. While watching three Bf 109s above him dive to port, Johnson lost sight of his wing commander at 15,000 feet. Immediately a Bf 109E flew in front of him and turned slightly to port at a range of 150 yards. After receiving hits, the Bf 109's hood was jettisoned and the pilot baled out. Several No. 145 Squadron pilots witnessed the victory. He had expended 278 rounds from P7837's guns. The Bf 109 was one of five lost by Jagdgeschwader 2 (Fighter Wing 2) that day.

A flurry of action followed. On 1 July 1941 he expended 89 rounds and damaged a Bf 109E. Bader's section was attacked and Johnson out-turned his assailant. Firing, he saw glycol streaming behind it. On 14 July, the Tangmere Wing flew on Circus 48 to St Omer. Losing sight of the squadron, Johnson and his wingman proceeded inland at 3,000 ft (910 m) after spotting three aircraft. Turning in behind them, he identified them as Bf 109Fs. Johnson dived so as to come up and underneath into the enemy's blind spot. Closing to 15 yards, he gave the trailing Bf 109 a two-second burst. The tail was blown off and his windshield was covered in oil from the Messerschmitt. Johnson saw the other Bf 109s spinning down out of control. Having also lost his wingman, Johnson disengaged. Climbing and crossing the coast at Etaples, Johnson bounced a Bf 109E. Giving chase in a dive to 2,000 ft (610 m) and firing at 150 yd (140 m), he observed something flying off the Bf 109's starboard wing. Johnson could not see any more owing to the oil-covered windscreen and did not make a claim. His second victory was probably Unteroffizier (corporal) R. Klienike, III./Jagdgeschwader 26 (Third Group, Fighter Wing 26) who was posted missing.

On 21 July, Johnson shared in the destruction of another Bf 109 with Pilot Officer Heppell. Johnson's wingman disappeared during the battle. Sergeant Mabbet was mortally wounded but made a wheels-up landing near St Omer. Impressed with his skilful flying while badly wounded, the Germans buried him with full honours. On 23 July, Johnson damaged another Bf 109.

Johnson took part in the 9 August 1941 mission in which Bader was lost over France. On that day Douglas Bader had been without his usual wingman Sir Alan Smith who was unable to fly due to having a head cold. During the sortie, Johnson destroyed a solitary Messerschmitt Bf 109. Johnson flew as wingman to Dundas in Bader's section. As the wing crossed the coast, around 70 Bf 109s were reported in the area, the Luftwaffe aircraft outnumbering Bader's wing by 3:1. Spotting a group of Bf 109s 1,000 ft (300 m) feet below them, Bader led a bounce on a lower group. The formations fell apart and the air battle became a mass of twisting aircraft;

It seemed to me the biggest danger was a collision rather than being shot down, that's how close we all were. We got the 109s we were bouncing then (Squadron Leader) Holden came down with his section, so there were a lot of aeroplanes ... just 50 yards apart. It was awful ... all you could think about was surviving, getting out of that mass of aircraft.

Johnson exited the melee and was then immediately attacked by three Bf 109s. The closest was 100 yards away. Maintaining a steep, tight, spiralling turn, he dived into cloud and immediately headed for Dover. Coming out of the cloud, Johnson saw a lone Bf 109. Suspecting it to be one of the three that had chased him, he searched for the other two. Seeing nothing, Johnson attacked and shot it down. It was his fourth victory. Johnson ended his month's tally by adding a probable victory on 21 August. But it had been a bad day and month for the wing. The much loathed Circus and Rhubarb raids had cost Fighter Command 108 fighters. The Germans lost just 18. On 4 September 1941 Johnson was promoted to flight lieutenant and awarded the Distinguished Flying Cross (DFC).

Johnson's last certain victories of the year were achieved on 21 September 1941. Escorting Bristol Blenheims to Gosnay, the top cover wings failed to rendezvous with the bombers. Near Le Touquet at 15:15 and around 20,000 feet, Johnson's section was bounced by 30 Bf 109s. Johnson broke and turned in and behind a Bf 109F. Approaching from a quarter astern and slightly below, Johnson fired closing from 200 to 70 yards. Pilot Officer Smith of Johnson's section observed the pilot bail out. Pursued by several enemy aircraft, Johnson dived to ground level. About 10 miles off Le Touquet, other Bf 109s attacked. Allowing the Germans to close within range, Johnson turned into a steep left-hand turn. It took him onto the tail of a Bf 109. Johnson fired and broke away at 50 yards. The Bf 109 was hit, stalled and crashed into the sea. Johnson was pursued until 10 miles south of Dover. The two victories made Johnson's total to six destroyed, which now meant he was an official flying ace. In winter 1941, Johnson and 616 Squadron moved to training duties. The odd convoy patrol was flown but it was an idle period for the squadron which had now concluded its "Tangmere tour".

=== Squadron leader to wing commander ===
On 31 January 1942, the squadron moved to RAF Kings Cliffe in Northamptonshire. After an uneventful few months, RAF Fighter Command resumed its offensive policy in April 1942 when the weather cleared for large-scale operations. Johnnie flew seven sweeps that month. But the situation had now changed. The Spitfire V, which was flown by the RAF had been a match for the Bf 109F, however, the Germans had introduced a new fighter: the Focke-Wulf Fw 190. It was faster at all altitudes below 25,000 ft (7,600 m), possessed a faster roll rate, was more heavily armed and could out-dive and out-climb the Spitfire. Only in the turn could the Spitfire outperform the Fw 190. The introduction of this new enemy fighter resulted in heavier casualty rates among the Spitfire squadrons until a new mark of Spitfire could be produced. Johnson claimed a damaged Fw 190 on 15 April 1942 but he witnessed the Fw 190s get the better of the British pilots consistently throughout most of 1942:

Yes, the 190 was causing us real problems at this time. We could out-turn it, but you couldn't turn all day. As the number of 190s increased, so the depth of our penetrations decreased. They drove us back to the coast really.

On 25 May, Johnson experienced an unusual mission. His section engaged a Dornier Do 217 carrying British markings, four miles west of his base. Johnson allowed the three inexperienced pilots to attack it, but they only managed to damage the bomber. Days later, on 26 June 1942, Johnson was awarded the bar to his DFC. More welcome news was received late in the month as the first Spitfire Mk. IXs began reaching RAF units. On 10 July 1942, Johnson was promoted to the rank of squadron leader, effective as of 13 July, and given command of 610 Squadron.

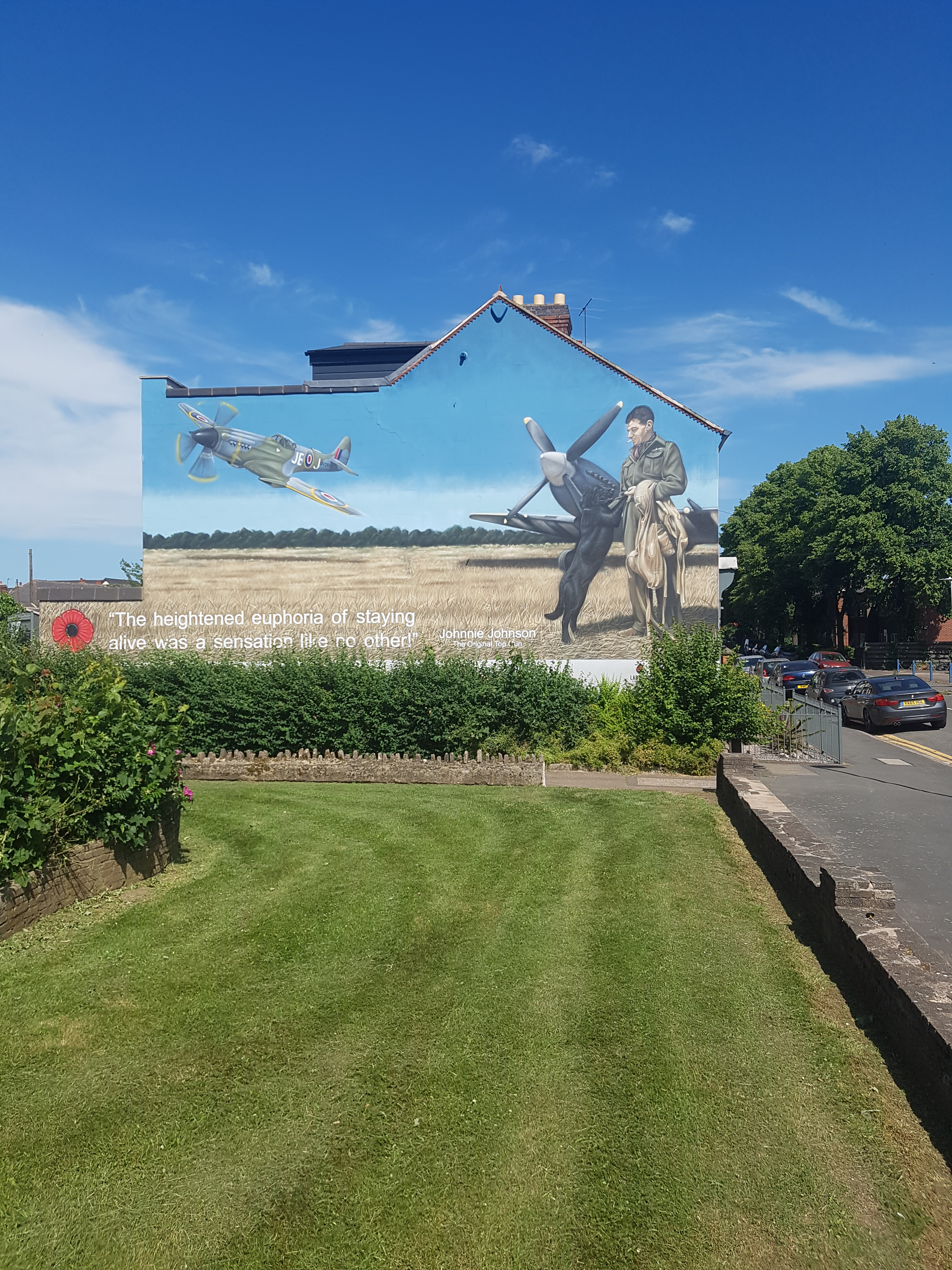
A mural on the side of a house in the town of Loughborough, UK, depicting Johnson. The house is across the road from Loughborough Grammar School, where Johnson was educated. The Mural is based upon a photograph of Johnson taken at Bazenville Landing Ground, Normandy, July 1944, with his Labrador, Sally.

In Rhubarb operations over France, Johnson's wing commander, Patrick Jameson, insisted that the line-astern formation be used which caused Johnson to question why tactics such as the finger-four had not been universally adopted. Johnson criticised the lack of tactical consistency and when his squadron flew top cover, he often changed to the finger-four as soon as they reached the French coast, hoping his wing leader would not notice.

By August 1942, preparations were begun for a major operation, Jubilee, at Dieppe. The Dieppe raid took place on 19 August 1942. Johnson took off at 07:40 in Spitfire VB. EP254, DW-B. Running into around 50 Bf 109s and Fw 190s in fours, pairs and singly. In a climbing attack Johnson shot down one Fw 190 which crashed into the sea and shared in the destruction of a Bf 109F. While heading back to base, Johnson attacked an alert Fw 190 which met his attack head on. The dogfight descended from 8,000 to zero feet. Flying over Dieppe, Johnson dived towards a destroyer in the hope its fire would drive off the Fw 190, now on his tail. The move worked and Johnson landed back at RAF West Malling at 09:20. For the remainder of the year, the squadron was moved to RAF Castletown in September 1942 to protect the Royal Navy fleet at Scapa Flow.

Johnson took command of No. 127 Wing RCAF based at RAF Kenley after Christmas and they received the new Spitfire IX: the answer to the Fw 190. After gaining a probable against a Fw 190 in February 1943, Johnnie selected Spitfire EN398 after a 50-minute test flight on 22 March 1943. It became his regular mount. Being a wing commander now meant his initials could be painted on the machine. His Spitfires now carried JE-J. He was also allotted the call sign "Greycap".

Johnson set about changing the wing's tactical approach. He quickly forced the wing to abandon the line-astern tactics for the finger-four formation which offered much more safety in combat; enabling multiple pilots to participate in scanning the skies for enemy aircraft so as to avoid an attack, and also being better able to spot and position their unit for a surprise attack upon the enemy. Johnson made another alteration to his units operations. He loathed ground-attack missions which highly trained fighter pilots were forced to participate in. He abandoned ground attack missions whenever he could. During these weeks, Johnson's wing escorted United States Army Air Forces (USAAF) bombers to targets in France. On a fighter sweep, Ramrod 49, Johnson destroyed an Fw 190 for his eighth victory. Unteroffizier Hans Hiess from 6. Staffel bailed out, but his parachute failed to open.

The spring proved to be a busy one; Johnson claimed three Fw 190s damaged two days later. On 11 and 13 May he destroyed an Fw 190 to reach ten individual air victories while sharing in the destruction of another on the later date and a Bf 109 on 1 June. A further five victories against Fw 190s were achieved in June. Two were claimed on 15 June. On 17 June while leading the wing over Calais Johnson bounced one of JG 26's Gruppen led by Wilhelm-Ferdinand Galland. He shot down Unteroffizier Gunther Freitag, 8./JG 26 who was killed. On 24 June he claimed one destroyed and one damaged on and another victory on the 27th to bring his total to 15.

Johnson scored more success in July. The USAAF began Blitz Week; a concentrated effort against German targets coinciding with RAF Bomber Command's attack on Hamburg. Escorting American bombers, Johnson destroyed three Bf 109s and damaged another, the last being shot down on 30 July; his tally stood at 18. There was still no standard formation procedure in Fighter Command, and Johnson's use of the finger-four made the wing distinct in the air. It earned 144 Wing the nickname "Wolfpack". The name remained until 144 Wing was moved to an Advanced Landing Ground (ALG) at Lashenden and was renamed No. 127 Wing RCAF, part of the RAF Second Tactical Air Force under the command of No. 83 Group RAF.

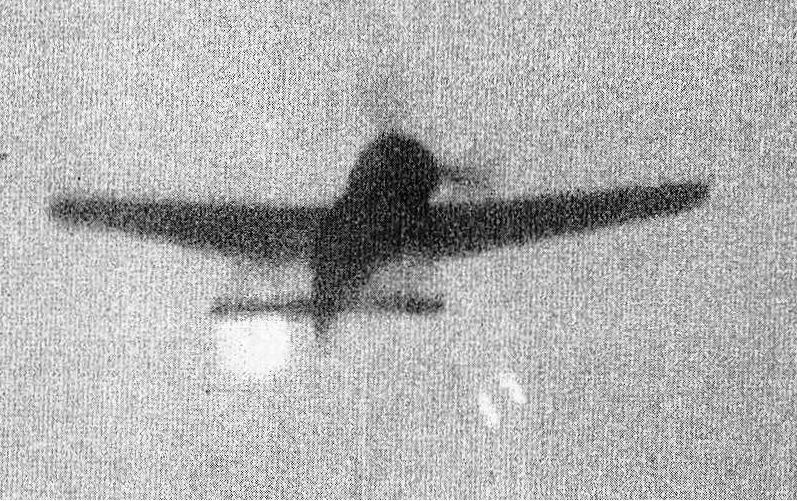
Gun camera image of Erich Borounik's Fw 190 on 23 August 1943 when Borounik became Johnson's 19th victory

The tactics proved successful in the Canadian wing. Johnson scored his 19th to 21st victories on 23 and 26 August, whilst claiming yet another Fw 190 on 4 September 1943. Johnson's 19th victory was Oberfeldwebel (First-Sergeant) Erich Borounik 10./JG 26, and Johnson's 21st victim was Oberfeldwebel Walter Grunlinger also of 10./JG 26. Both were killed.

Johnson's portrait is included in a montage of eighteen pilots painted by Olive Snell at RAF Westhampnett in 1943; it is now in the Goodwood collection on the same site.

=== Normandy to the Rhine ===
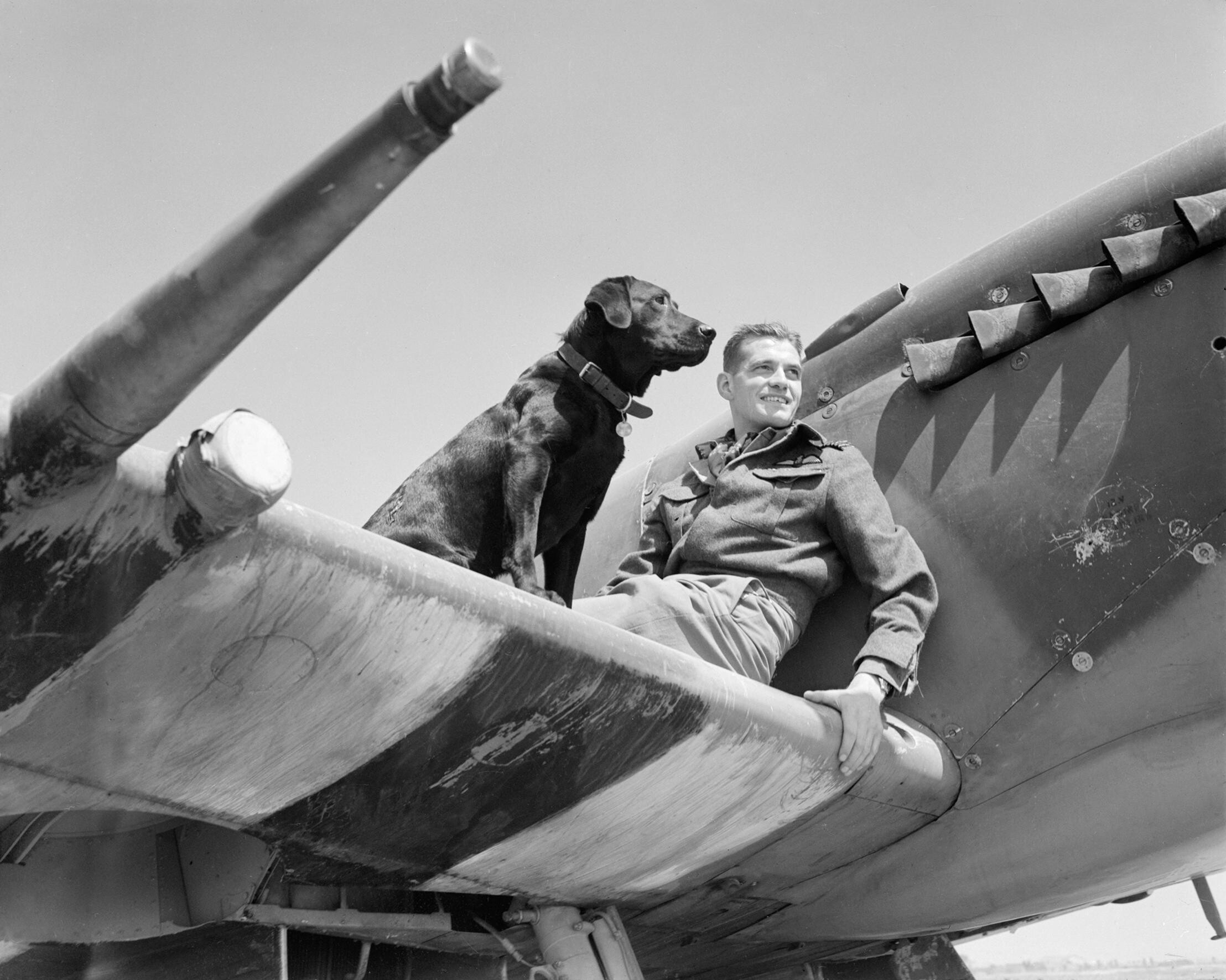
Johnson with his Labrador dog, Sally, on the wing of his Spitfire in Normandy, c. June–August 1944

In the lead up to the Battle of Normandy and the D-Day landings Johnson continued to score regularly. His 22nd and 23rd victories were achieved on 25 April 1944 and Johnson became the highest scoring ace still on operations. These victories were followed by another Fw 190 on 5 May (no. 24); III./JG 26 lost Feldwebel Horst Schwentick and Unteroffizier Manfred Talkenberg killed during the air battle. After the landings in France on 6 June 1944, Johnson added further to his tally, claiming another five aerial victories that month including two Bf 109s on 28 June. The mission in which Johnson recorded his 26th victory on 22 June was particularly eventful; four more Fw 190s fell to his wing. After bouncing a formation of Bf 109s and Fw 190s, he shot down a Bf 109 for his 29th victory. Five days later, Johnson destroyed two Fw 190s to reach his 30th and 31st air victories.

Johnson's wing was the first to be stationed on French soil following the invasion. With their radius of action now far extended compared to the squadrons still in Britain, the wing scored heavily through the summer. On 21 August 1944, Johnson was leading No. 443 Squadron on a patrol over the Seine, near Paris. Johnson bounced a formation of Focke-Wulf Fw 190s, shooting down two, which were recorded on the cine camera. Climbing back to his starting point at 8,000 ft, Johnson attempted to join a formation of six aircraft, he thought were Spitfires. The fighters were actually Messerschmitt Bf 109s. Johnson escaped by doing a series of steep climbs, during which he nearly stalled and blacked out. He eventually evaded the Messerschmitts, which had been trying to flank him on either side, while two more stuck to his tail. Johnson's Spitfire IX was hit by enemy aircraft fire for the only time, taking cannon shells in the rudder and elevators. Johnson had now equalled and surpassed Sailor Malan's record score of 32, shooting down two Fw 190s for his 32nd and 33rd air victories. However Johnson considered Malan's exploits to be better. Johnson points out, when Malan fought (during 1940–41), he did so outnumbered, and had matched the enemy even then. Johnson said:

Malan had fought with great distinction when the odds were against him. He matched his handful of Spitfires against greatly superior numbers of Luftwaffe fighters and bombers. He had been forced to fight a defensive battle over southern England and often at a tactical disadvantage, when the top-cover Messerschmitts [Bf 109s and Bf 110s] were high in the sun. I had always fought on the offensive, and, after 1941, I had either a squadron, a wing or sometimes two wings behind me.

In September 1944 Johnson's wing participated in support actions for Operation Market Garden in the Netherlands. On 27 September 1944, Johnson's last victory of the war was over Nijmegen. His flight bounced a formation of nine Bf 109s, one of which Johnson shot down. During this combat Squadron Leader Henry "Wally" McLeod, of the Royal Canadian Air Force, and his squadron had joined Johnson. During this action McLeod went missing, possibly shot down by Siegfried Freytag of Jagdgeschwader 77 (Fighter Wing 77).

The wing rarely saw enemy aircraft for the remainder of the year. Only on 1 January 1945 did the Germans appear in large numbers, during Operation Bodenplatte to support their faltering attack in the Ardennes. Johnson witnessed the German attack on his wing's airfield at Brussels–Melsbroek. He recalled the Germans seemed inexperienced and their shooting was "atrocious". Johnson led a Spitfire patrol to prevent a second wave of German aircraft attacking but engaged no enemy aircraft, since there was no follow-up attack. From late January and through most of February, Johnson reduced his flying time.

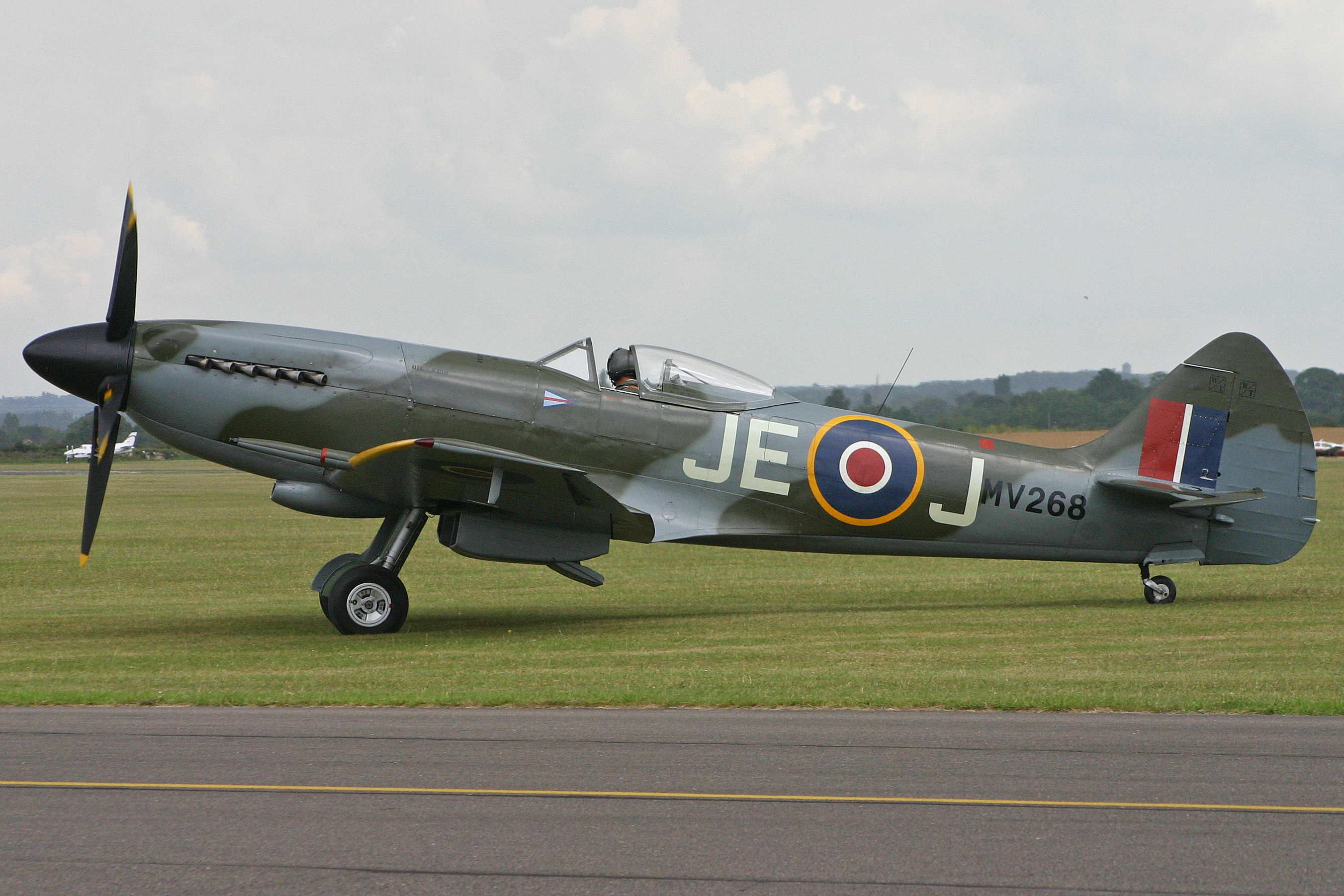
Spitfire Mk XIV G-SPIT (2011). As a tribute to Johnson, this aircraft was painted to represent MV268, a Spitfire of the same type that he flew

In March 1945, Johnson patrolled as Operation Plunder and Operation Varsity pushed Allied armies into Germany. There was little sign of the Luftwaffe. Numerous ground-attack operations were carried out instead. On 26 March Johnson's wing was relocated to Twente and he was promoted to group captain. Days later Johnson took command of No. 125 Wing. On 5 April, after returning from patrol in Spitfire Mk XIV MV268, he switched off the engine just as a Bf 109 flew overhead. Seeing the Spitfire, it turned in for an attack; Johnson took cover under his fighter while the airfield defences shot down the 109. On 16 April 1945 Johnson's wing moved to RAF Celle in Germany.

During the last week of the war, Johnson's squadron flew patrols over Berlin and Kiel as German resistance crumbled. During a flight over central Germany looking for jet fighters, Johnson's squadron attacked Luftwaffe airfields. On one sortie, his unit strafed and destroyed 11 Bf 109s that were preparing to take off. On another sortie, an enemy transport was sighted, but took evasive action and retreated back to German held territory but Johnson's pilots shot it down. On another occasion, Johnson intercepted a flight of four Fw 190s. The German fighters, however, waggled their wings to signal non-hostile intent and Johnson's unit escorted them to an RAF airfield.

After the German capitulation in May 1945, Johnson relocated with his unit to Copenhagen, Denmark. Here, his association with the Belgian No. 350 Squadron RAF led him to be awarded the Croix de Guerre with Palm and the rank of officer of the Order of Léopold with Palms.

== Post-war ==
Johnson was given a permanent commission by the RAF after the war initially as a squadron leader, on promotion to wing commander (his wartime rank) becoming OC Tactics at the Central Fighter Establishment at RAF West Raynham in Norfolk.

=== Korean War and afterwards ===
During an exchange posting to the US Air Force, in 1950 he served in the Korean War flying the Lockheed F-80 Shooting Star, and later flew the North American F-86 Sabres with the US Air Force Tactical Air Command. Johnson did not leave any written record of his experiences but at the end of his tour received the US Air Medal and Legion of Merit.

In 1951, Johnson commanded a wing at RAF Fassberg, a station in the RAF Second Tactical Air Force in West Germany. In 1952, he was promoted to group captain and commanded RAF Wildenrath in West Germany until 1954. From 1954 to 1957 he was deputy director operations (DD(Ops)) at the Air Ministry in London. In 1956 his wartime memoir, Wing Leader was published. On 20 October 1957, Johnson became commanding officer of RAF Cottesmore in the UK, commanding a station operating the Victor V bomber. In 1960 he was promoted to air commodore and attended the Imperial Defence College (IDC) course in London and in June 1960 was made a Commander of the Order of the British Empire (CBE) for his work as station commander at Cottesmore. After the course he was posted to the headquarters of No. 3 Group RAF of Bomber Command at RAF Mildenhall. On 1 October 1963 he was promoted to air vice marshal and served as air officer commanding (AOC) RAF Middle East based at Aden.

In 1964 he published his book Full Circle, a history of air fighting, co-written with Percy "Laddie" Lucas, a former Member of Parliament and Douglas Bader's brother-in-law. In 1965 on retirement from the RAF he was appointed a Companion of the Order of the Bath (CB).

=== Later life ===
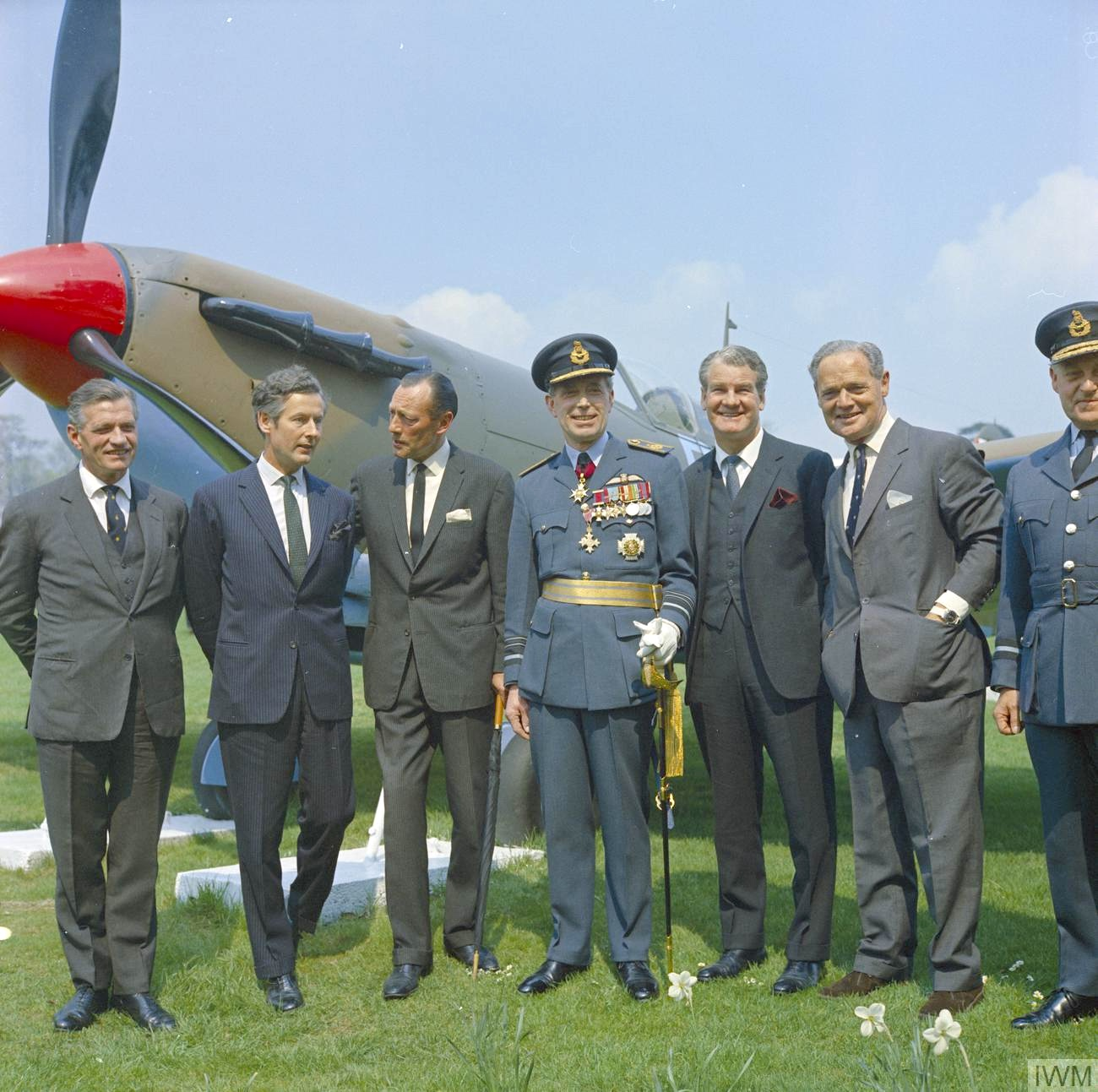
Johnson with several other World War II aces, 1968

Johnson was a deputy lieutenant for the County of Leicestershire in 1967. He established the Johnnie Johnson Housing Trust. In 1969 and by 2001 the housing association managed over 4,000 properties.

After the death of the WW2 RAF fighter pilot Douglas Bader in 1982, Johnson, Denis Crowley-Milling and Sir Hugh Dundas set up the Douglas Bader Foundation, to continue supporting disabled charities, of which Bader was a passionate supporter.

Johnson was also the first to recognise the skills of Robert Taylor, aviation artist, in the 1980s. Depictions of aircraft and battle scenes in print began to become popular and he helped Taylor promote them. The venture was successful and Johnson's sons set up their own distribution networks in the United States and Britain.

Johnson spent most of the 1980s and 1990s as a keynote speaker, fundraiser and spending time on his hobbies; travelling, fishing, shooting and walking his dogs. Johnson appeared on the long–running British television show This Is Your Life on 8 May 1985, the 40th anniversary of VE Day. Among the programme's guests was German fighter ace Walter Matoni. British wartime propaganda had alleged Johnson had challenged Matoni to a personal duel; a version of events denied by Johnson. The two men arranged to meet after the war but were unable to do so until the TV programme. Among other guests was Hugh Dundas, "Nip" Heppel, who flew alongside Johnson on his first operation—in which he earned a rebuke from Bader—Crowley-Milling, Johnson's former wing commander Patrick Jameson and his uncle, Charlie Rossell who was over 100 years old at the time.

== Personal life ==
As a teenager, Johnson became fascinated by speed and joined the Melton Car Club with two boyhood friends. Johnson enjoyed the lifestyle of cars and "pacey women". Although he had many early interests, Johnson later settled and added to his family. On 14 November 1942, Johnson married Pauline Ingate in Norwich during home leave. Hugh Dundas acted as best man and Lord Beaverbrook's son, Wing Commander Max Aitken also attended. During the war Pauline worked for the Fire Service. They had two sons: Michael (16 October 1944) and Chris (born 1 December 1946). After the couple split up, Johnson lived in Buxton, Derbyshire with his partner, Janet Partridge.

On 30 January 2001, Johnson, aged 85 years, died from cancer. A memorial service took place on 25 April 2001 at St Clement Danes and the hymns Jerusalem and I Vow to Thee, My Country were played. His children scattered his ashes on the Chatsworth estate in Derbyshire. The only memorial was a bench dedicated to him at his favourite fishing spot on the Monsall Dale area of the estate; the inscription reads "In Memory of a Fisherman".

== List of air victories ==
Johnson's wartime record was 515 sorties flown, 34 aircraft claimed destroyed with a further seven shared destroyed (three and one shared victories), three probable destroyed, 10 damaged, and one shared, destroyed on the ground. All his victories were fighters. As a wing leader, Johnson was able to use his initials "JE-J" in place of squadron code letters. He scored the bulk of his victories flying two Mk IXs: EN398/JEJ in which he shot down 12 aircraft and shared five plus six and one shared damaged, while commanding the Kenley Wing; MK392/JEJ, an L.F Mk. IX, 12 aircraft plus one shared, destroyed on the ground. His last victory of the war was scored in this aircraft. Johnson ended the war flying a Mk XIVE, MV268/JEJ. His post-war mount was MV257/JEJ; it was the last Spitfire to carry his initials.

The ability to verify British claims against the British' main opponents in 1941 and 1942, JG 26 and JG 2, is very limited. Only two of the 30 volumes of War Diaries produced by JG 26 survived the war. Historian Donald Caldwell has attempted to use what limited German material is available to compare losses and air victory claims but acknowledges the lack of sources leave the possibility for error.

List of aerial victories
Claim No.	Date	Location	Flying	Aircraft type	Notes
	15 Jan 1941		Spitfire IA K4477	Dornier Do 17 half-share damaged	
1.	26 June 1941	Near North Coates	Spitfire IA; K4477	Messerschmitt Bf 109	RAF Fighter Command claimed nine; JG 2 lost five and two pilots killed. Johnson witnessed the pilot bail out. Possibly the Bf 109F-2 (Werknummer 6759—factory number) flown by Unteroffizier Max Meindl of 4./JG 2. It seems as though Meindl was hit as Johnson was firing, as he attempted to bail out. Meindl's death was confirmed the following day.
	4 July 1941	Gravelines	Spitfire IIA P7837	Messerschmitt Bf 109 damaged	
2.	6 July 1941	South of Dunkirk	Spitfire IIA P7837	Messerschmitt Bf 109	RAF Fighter Command claimed 11; JG 26 reported two Bf 109s damaged.
3.	14 July 1941	Fauquembergues	Spitfire VB P8707	Messerschmitt Bf 109	Unteroffizier Robert Klienike, III./JG 26, missing. According to the War Diary of JG 26, Klienike was confirmed to have been killed.
	21 July 1941	Merville, Nord	Spitfire IIA P7837	Messerschmitt Bf 109 half-share "probable".	JG 26 claimed six for two losses—Heinrich Gleixner of II./JG 26. JG claimed five for one loss.
	23 July 1941	10 miles inland from Boulogne	Spitfire IIA P7837	Messerschmitt Bf 109 damaged	
4.	9 August 1941	Over Béthune	Spitfire VB W3334	Messerschmitt Bf 109 half-share Bf 109 destroyed	RAF Fighter Command claimed 18; JG 26 lost two fighters. JG 2 losses unknown.
	21 August 1941	10 miles east Le Touquet	Spitfire VB W3457	Messerschmitt Bf 109 "probable"	
	4 September 1941	Le Touquet	Spitfire VB W3432	Messerschmitt Bf 109 half-share "probable"	Fighter Command lost seven Spitfires and three damaged. JG 26 claimed 9 and JG 2 filed three claims. According to surviving German records no losses were sustained by any German unit.
5–6.	21 September 1941	Near Le Touquet	Spitfire VB W3428	Two Messerschmitt Bf 109s	According to the German diary JG 26 lost Leutnant Ulrich Dzialas shot down from 8./JG 26. JG 2 losses are unknown. JG 2 claimed 10 and JG 26 filed claims for another 15 victories. Fighter Command lost 12.
	15 April 1942	Le Touquet	Spitfire VB BM121	Focke-Wulf Fw 190 damaged	
7.	19 August 1942	Dieppe	Spitfire VB EP215 "DW-B"	Focke-Wulf Fw 190; Fw 190 a half-share damaged third-share Bf 109F destroyed	Claimed during patrol from 07:40 – 09:10, it is likely his opponents were from I./JG 26 which landed at 09:30. Of the six pilot losses JG 26 suffered, times are unknown for three. In the Dieppe area Oberfeldwebel Werner Gerhardt 5 staffel was killed in Fw 190A-3 (Werknummer 538), code BK+3. Unteroffizier Heinrich von Berg was also killed in Fw 190A-3/U3 (Werknummer 2240). The third pilot flew a Bf 109; its pilot Johannes Schmidt was killed in Werknummer 14058. The third share Bf 109 destroyed was with P/O Smith and F/S Creagh. JG 2 lost 15 Fw 190s with two pilots killed, six missing, and seven wounded. Among the casualties was Oberleutnant and Gruppenkommandeur Erich Leie who parachuted to safety after claiming his 42nd victory.
	20 August 1942	Off French Coast	Spitfire VB EP215	Focke-Wulf Fw 190 "probable"	
	13 February 1943	Near Boulogne	Spitfire IX EP121	Focke-Wulf Fw 190 "probable"	Part of 'Rodeo 168' flown by 11 Group; Four Spitfires lost in total. 610 Sqn lost one Spitfire in combat with 7.JG 2. RAF claimed 2–1–1. No Luftwaffe losses recorded, though two Fw 109s (of unspecified units) landed with combat damage during the day.
8.	3 April 1943	Montreuil, Pas-de-Calais	Spitfire IX EN398	Focke-Wulf Fw 190	First operation as Kenley Wing Leader, part of 'Ramrod 49' to bomb Abbeville airfield. Fw 190A-4 (Werknummer 2440) "Brown 5" of Unteroffizier Hans Hiess, 6./JG 26 (6 Staffel or Squadron) killed.
	5 April 1943	Ostend-Ghent area	Spitfire IX EN398	Three Focke-Wulf Fw 190 damaged	B-17 escort. Combat probably versus I./JG 2 and/or II./JG 1.
9.	11 May 1943	Gravelines	Spitfire IX EN398	Focke-Wulf Fw 190	Circus 29 to the rail-yards at Outreau, escorting six No. 180 Squadron RAF B-25 Mitchell II bombers. Fw 190s led by Josef Priller engaged the wing. According to JG 26 records neither side scored.
10.	13 May 1943	Berck-Le Touquet	Spitfire IX EN398	Focke-Wulf Fw 190 third-shared Fw 190 destroyed	Fighter Command claimed 10. JG 26 lost 2. I./JG 27 (Fighter Wing 27) lost two, III./JG 54 lost one, JG 2 lost four, JG 26 lost eight. Fw 190 shared with Pilot Officer Dowding and Flight Officer Bowen both of No. 403 Squadron RCAF. The 7-victory ace Otto "Stotto" Stammberger from 4./JG 26 was shot down by Spitfires on this date. His Fw 190 A-4, Werknummer 739 "White 9" was destroyed and Stammberger was injured when the parachute only partially opened. 6./JG 26's Unteroffizier Werner Lonsdorfer, in Werknummmer 2433 "Brown 13" was killed in action with Spitfires on this date also.
11.	14 May 1943	Near Nieuwpoort.	Spitfire IX EN398	Focke-Wulf Fw 190	Ramrod 71 escorting 88 B-17s. Opponents were from JG 1 and JG 26. JG 26 suffered 7 Fw 190s lost. One in a collision with a 611 Spitfire, three in action with American bombers and two in action with P-47 Thunderbolts. JG 1 were also in action against the bombers.
	1 June 1943	Baie de Somme	Spitfire IX EN398	Half-share Messerschmitt Bf 109 destroyed	Shared with F/O Bowen of No 403 Sqn. Running dogfight involving over 80 fighters versus I./JG 27 and II./JG 26 between Abbeville-St. Pol. Three claimed by Kenley Wing; I./JG 27 lost three 109s, including Gruppenkomandeur Hauptmann Erich Hohagen, who baled out injured.
12–13.	15 June 1943	Yvetot	Spitfire IX EN398	Two Focke-Wulf Fw 190s	The Kenley Wing claimed three; I./JG 2 lost two Fw 190s; one was Unteroffizier Karl Heinz Kürth, wounded and force landed his Fw 190A-5 (Werknummer 2355) on Bernay airfield.
14.	17 June 1943	Ypres-Saint-Omer	Spitfire IX EN398	Focke-Wulf Fw 190	Fw 190A-5 (Werknummer 7308) "Black 9" of Unteroffizier Gunther Freitag, 8./JG 26. Crashed and killed at Steenvorde, Ypres, Flanders.
15.	24 June 1943	Fécamp-Valmont, Seine-Maritime	Spitfire IX EN398	Focke-Wulf Fw 190; Fw 190 damaged	Victim probably from Jafu 3's I./JG 2.
16.	27 June 1943	St Omer	Spitfire IX EN398	Focke-Wulf Fw 190	Freelance sweep over St. Omer by Hornchurch and Kenley Wings. RAF claimed one Fw 190 and two Bf 109s, but according to the JG 26 War Diary the Germans claimed no victories and claimed to have sustained no losses.
17.	15 July 1943	Senarpont	Spitfire IX EN398	Messerschmitt Bf 109	Johnson spotted a lone pair of Bf 109s, shooting down one. Possibly versus I./JG 27.
18.	25 July 1943	Schipol	Spitfire IX EN398	Messerschmitt Bf 109	Victim probably from III./JG 54. The pilot was reported killed but the victim's identity is unknown. Pilot Officer Isbister and Flying Officer L. Foster watched the enemy aircraft dive pouring white smoke. Isbister said it began to break up and Foster saw it dive into some cloud at 3,000 feet and a short time later saw an aircraft burning on the ground in the same area. May possibly be either Unteroffizier Pfeiffe (baled out wounded), or Unteroffizier Werner Walther (killed).
	29 July 1943	Amsterdam	Spitfire IX EN398	Messerschmitt Bf 109 damaged	
	30 July 1943	Axel Schipol	Spitfire IX EN398	Half-share Messerschmitt Bf 109 destroyed	'Ramrod 23' to Schipol.
	12 August 1943		Spitfire IX EN398	Half-share Messerschmitt Bf 109 destroyed half-share Bf 109 damaged	Versus 11 staffel, JG 26. The War Diary records no losses.
	17 August 1943	Ghent	Spitfire IX EN398	Quarter-share Messerschmitt Bf 110 destroyed	
19.	23 August 1943	Gosnay	Spitfire IX EN398	Focke-Wulf Fw 190	Oberfeldwebel Erich Borounik 10./JG 26 Killed in Fw 190A-5 "Black 12". The victory was recorded on Johnson's gun camera film.
20.	26 August 1943	Rouen	Spitfire IX MA573	Focke-Wulf Fw 190	JG 26 War Diary has no entry for this date.
21.	4 September 1943	Roubaix	Spitfire IX MA573	Focke-Wulf Fw 190	A Fw 190A-5 (Werknummer 57287) of Oberfeldwebel Walter Grünlinger, a 7-victory ace with 10./JG 26, killed.
	5 September 1943	Daynze area	Spitfire IX EN938	Messerschmitt Bf 109 damaged	
22–23.	25 April 1944	Laon	Spitfire IXB MK392	Two Focke-Wulf Fw 190s	Two victories witnessed by Pilot Officer Gomez and Flying Officer Stephens. Both saw the Fw 190s crash.
24.	5 May 1944	Douai	Spitfire IXB MK392	Focke-Wulf Fw 190	Among Johnson's opponents were III./JG 26. Feldwebel Horst Schwentick, in Fw 190A-8 (Werknummer 170116) "White 10", and Unteroffizier Manfred Talkenberg, who were both killed. Henry Wallace McLeod filed a claim and recorded the wreckage on his gun camera film over a field three miles east of Douai. Two more claims were made by Pilot Officer F.A.W.J. Wilson of 441 Squadron and Pilot Officer T.C. Gamey of the same unit. German records only record two losses. Johnson stated in his report that the Fw 190 pilot he shot down baled out.
25.	16 June 1944	Villers-Bocage, Somme	Spitfire IXB MK392	Focke-Wulf Fw 190	Victory was recorded on gun camera film over an unidentified Fw 190.
26.	22 June 1944	Argentan	Spitfire IXB MK392	Messerschmitt Bf 109	Victory recorded on gun camera film over an unidentified Bf 109. 144 Wing claimed four destroyed. Opponents were from III./JG 26 and JG 2.
27–28.	28 June 1944	Caen	Spitfire IXB MK392	Two Messerschmitt Bf 109s	Recorded on gun camera film over two unidentified Bf 109s 'fighter bombers' while leading No. 442 Sqn. on an armed reconnaissance. 5. Jagd Division made a large effort in this area in support of German land defences during Operation Epsom. Around 24 Fw 190s and Bf 109s were lost. RAF fighters claimed 34, and 144 Wing as a whole claimed 25 destroyed outright, one 'probable' and 13 damaged. The Germans claimed five Spitfires and three American fighters. The action was so intense it is impossible to match up individual combats. III./JG 26 lost three Bf 109s shot down, including the Bf 109G-6 (Werknummer 165186) "Blue 10"; Leutnant Josef Menze, who was injured. The other two pilots baled out unhurt. Ofhr. Helmut Schwartz-Arnyasy of Stab./JG 27, in Bf 109G-6 (Werknummer 163246) "<4+"was shot down and posted missing in action north west of Caen.
29.	30 June 1944	E Gace	Spitfire IXB NH380	Messerschmitt Bf 109.	
30–31.	5 July 1944	Alençon	Spitfire IXB NH380	Two Focke-Wulf Fw 190s	144 Wing claimed four downed. Johnson's victims likely belonged to I./JG 11 (Fighter Wing 11). Oberleutnant Heinz-Gerhard Vogt, a 28-victory ace, was shot down in this area in this battle. Vogt, of 7./JG 26, survived to be killed in action later in the year.
	20 July 1944	Argentan	Spitfire IXB MK392	Focke-Wulf Fw 190 damaged	Probably the Fw 190A-8 (Werknummer 172682) "Yellow 11" of Unteroffizier Otto Stuckenbrock of 6./JG 1. He baled out over Allied territory and was taken prisoner.
32–33.	23 August 1944	Senlis	Spitfire IXB NH382	Two Focke-Wulf Fw 190s	127 Wing claimed 12 destroyed (eight Fw 190s, four Bf 109s) for three losses. I./JG 2, I./JG 11 and II./JG 26 were flying in the Paris area at that time (13:35 hours) and lost 10 Fw 190s, while III./JG 27 lost three Bf 109s. I./JG 2 lost four: Unteroffizier Kurt Dreissig unhurt, Fähnrich Hans Gunther killed, Hauptmann Siegfried Bogs killed and an unknown pilot. I./JG 11 lost Unteroffizier Karl Brunner unhurt, Leutnant Kurt Ebener captured, Leutnant Kurt Hubinek captured, Oberfähnrich Alfred Wittig and an unknown pilot. II./JG 26 lost Obergefreiter Heinz Nieter wounded (crashed on take-off). III./JG 27 lost Gefreiter Josef Steigenberger killed, Oberleutnant Dietrich Sponnagel unwounded, and Feldwebel Heinrich Eickhof killed.
34.	27 September 1944	Rees on Rhine	Spitfire IXB NH382	Messerschmitt Bf 109	Probably belonging to JG 77. McLeod lost in combat with Siegfried Freytag. Unteroffizier Franz Mayer of 6./JG 77 was posted missing in Bf 109G-6 (Werknummer 163463) near Nijmegen. Unteroffizier Hans Röhrich from 5./JG 77 Bf 109 G-6 Werknummer 163506 was lost near Arnhem not far from Rees. Also shot down that day was 5./JG 77 Staffelkapitän Franz Hrdlicka. He parachuted out over Bocholt, Germany, a few miles east of Rees.

== Notes ==
Military offices
Preceded by Frederick Rosier	Air Officer Commanding Air Forces Middle East; 1963–1965	Succeeded by Andrew Humphrey
