= Otto Stammberger =

German aviator and World War II flying ace

- Born: 20 February 1920; Michelau in Oberfranken, Weimar Germany
- Died: 11 July 2000 (aged 80)
- Military career
- Allegiance: Nazi Germany
- Branch: Luftwaffe
- Service years: 1939–1945
- Rank: Oberleutnant
- Unit: JG 26
- Conflicts: World War II

Otto Stammberger (20 February 1920 – 11 July 2000) was a German aviator and World War II flying ace.

On 26 February 1943, Stammberger was appointed Staffelkapitän of 4. Staffel of Jagdgeschwader 26 "Schlageter" (JG 26—26th Fighter Wing). He succeeded Oberleutnant Kurt Ebersberger who was transferred. On 13 May, he was shot down in his Focke-Wulf Fw 190 A-4 (Werknummer 0739—factory number). He bailed out near Lynck, located approximately 3 kilometers (1.9 miles) south-southwest of Looberghe. Due to his injuries sustained, he was replaced by Leutnant Helmut Hoppe as commander of the Staffel.

Mathews and Foreman, authors of Luftwaffe Aces – Biographies and Victory Claims, researched the German Federal Archives and found records for seven aerial victory claims, plus four further unconfirmed claims. All of his aerial victories were claimed over the Western Allies and includes five four-engine bombers.
