= 443 Maritime Helicopter Squadron =

- 443^{e} Escadron d'hélicoptères maritimes
- Active: 20 April 1942–15 March 1946; 12 September 1951–31 March 1964; 25 October 1974–present
- Country: Canada
- Branch: Royal Canadian Air Force
- Role: Maritime helicopter
- Part of: 12 Wing Shearwater
- Base: Patricia Bay, British Columbia
- Nickname(s): Hornet
- Motto(s): Our sting is death
- Battle honours: Fortress Europe, 1944; France and Germany, 1944–1945; Normandy, 1944; Arnhem; Rhine; Libya, 2011; Arabian Sea
- Website: canada.ca/en/air-force/corporate/squadrons/443-squadron.html

Insignia
- Squadron badge heraldry: A hornet affronté
- Squadron codes=: 2I (Feb 1944 – Mar 1946); PF (Sep 1951 – 1958)

Aircraft flown
- Attack: Supermarine Spitfire, North American Mustang, North American F-86 Sabre
- Helicopter: Sikorsky CH-124 Sea King, CH-148 Cyclone
- Trainer: North American Harvard, Beechcraft Model 18

443 Maritime Helicopter Squadron (French: 443^{e} Escadron d'hélicoptères maritimes) is a Canadian Armed Forces helicopter squadron under the Royal Canadian Air Force (RCAF), on Vancouver Island, British Columbia. It was originally a Second World War RCAF squadron that operated as part of RAF Fighter Command in Europe with the Supermarine Spitfire.

== History ==
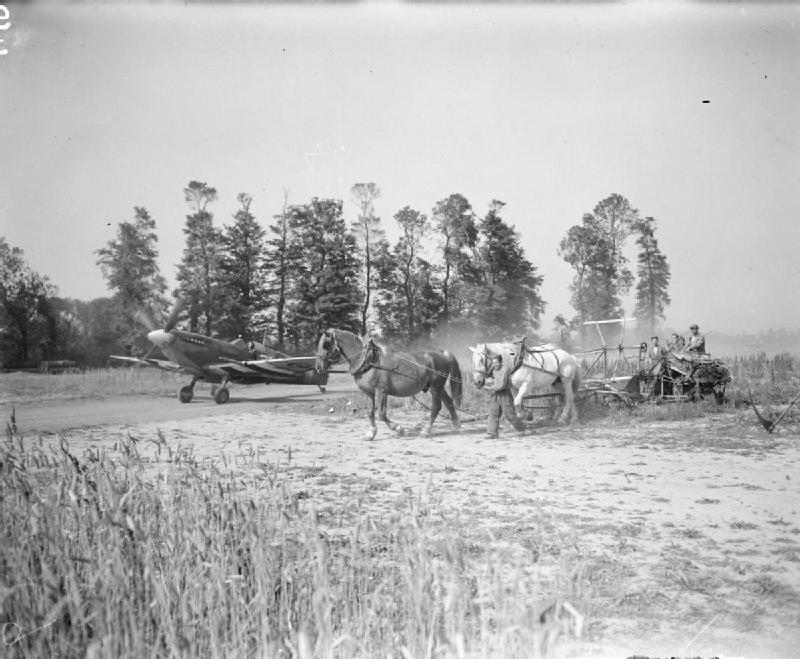
A Spitfire Mark IX of No. 443 Squadron taxies to dispersal at B-2 Bazenville, alongside a field where French farmers are gathering in the wheat

=== Formation and World War II ===
Originally formed as No. 127 (Fighter) Squadron in the fighter role in July 1942, it operated along the East Coast of Canada (Including RCAF Gander in Newfoundland) flying Hawker Hurricanes until late 1943, when it was selected for overseas service. Arriving in Britain on 8 February 1944, it was redesignated No. 443 Squadron at Bournemouth and was soon based at RAF Digby, Lincolnshire, together with Nos. 441 and 442 Squadrons as Article XV squadrons under the control of the British Royal Air Force.

Working up on Spitfire Mk. Vs from RAF Westhampnett, the squadron received Spitfire Mk. IXs the following month when a move was made to Holmsley South to form No. 144 Wing RAF, Second Tactical Air Force, and the squadron became operational. The first sorties were as bomber escorts and until the invasion in June the squadron carried out deep penetration missions using 90-imperial-gallon (410 L) drop tanks. During the Normandy landings themselves, the squadron provided low-level fighter cover and on 15 June it moved to France in the close-support and armed aerial reconnaissance role. It was now heavily involved in ground attack sorties and continued to move forward following the Allied advance through Belgium and into the Netherlands to maintain its close air support of the ground forces. Having returned to RAF Warmwell for an air-firing course the squadron missed the Luftwaffe's New Year's attack on Allied airfields. Unlike its two fellow squadrons, it did not return to Britain, but stayed on the continent, following the Allied armies advance into Germany equipped with the Spitfire Mk. XVI. With the end of the war the squadron joined the British Air Forces of Occupation until disbanding at Uetersen on 15 March 1946.

=== Post war ===
The squadron was re-formed on 12 September 1951 at RCAF Station Sea Island (Vancouver) and became New Westminster (Vancouver) Auxiliary Squadron. Aircraft flown included the North American P-51 Mustang, Harvard, and Expeditor. The squadron again disbanded on 31 March 1964.

No. 443 was reactivated again on 25 October 1974 as 443 Anti-Submarine Helicopter Squadron at CFB Shearwater, Nova Scotia. In the late 1980s, the squadron moved to Patricia Bay on Vancouver Island. In 1995 the squadron changed its name to 443 Maritime Helicopter Squadron. It flew the CH-124 Sea King helicopter in support of Canadian Forces warships in the Arabian Sea after the 11 September 2001 terrorist attacks. As of March 2019, the squadron operates three CH-148 Cyclone helicopters.

== Aircraft operated ==
Dates	Aircraft	Variant	Notes
February 1944 – April 1944	Supermarine Spitfire	Mk.Vb	Single-engined piston fighter
April 1944 – February 1945	Supermarine Spitfire	Mk.IXb	
January 1945 – January 1946	Supermarine Spitfire	Mk.XVI	
January 1946 – April 1946	Supermarine Spitfire	Mk.XIVe	
September 1951 – March 1964	Beechcraft Expeditor	C-45	Dual-engined Trainer & Utility aircraft
December 1951 – September 1958	North American Harvard	T-6 (Harvard Mk.2)	Single-engined trainer
November 1952 – October 1956	North American Mustang	P-51D (Mustang Mk.4)	Single-engined piston fighter
August 1956 – 1958	North American Sabre	F-86 (Sabre Mk.5)	Single-engined jet fighter
October 1974 – December 2018	Sikorsky Sea King	CH-124	Helicopter
August 2018 – Present	Sikorsky CH-148 Cyclone	CH-148	Helicopter
