= No. 85 Group RAF =

Former Royal Air Force operations group

No. 85 Group
- Active: 17 December 1943-1 July 1946; 1 December 1948-1 July 1950
- Country: United Kingdom
- Branch: Royal Air Force
- Type: Royal Air Force group
- Role: Base construction and air defence
- Size: Up to 8 flying and construction wings
- Part of: RAF Second Tactical Air Force
- Engagements: Operation Overlord; Operation Market Garden; Defence of Antwerp

Commanders
- Notable commanders: Air Vice-Marshal John Cole-Hamilton; Air Vice-Marshal Charles Steele; Air Vice-Marshal Dermot Boyle

No. 85 Group was a Group of the Royal Air Force (RAF) during World War II. It was responsible for airfield construction and the air defence of the beachhead bases during the Allied invasion of Normandy in 1944 (Operation Overlord) and the subsequent campaign.

== History ==
No. 85 Group was formed on 17 December 1943 within 2nd Tactical Air Force (2nd TAF) from wings of the RAF Airfield Construction Service. It was renamed No. 85 (Base) Group under the command of Air Vice Marshal John Cole-Hamilton on 14 February 1944.

85 Group's role was to defend the vital beachhead and base area for 21st Army Group and 2nd TAF once the landings on D-Day had been achieved. Air superiority over the battlefield was vital and the landing area had been chosen partly because of the availability of suitable sites for airfields. Until these could be constructed, 2nd TAF aircraft had to operate from Southern England, which curtailed their time over the bridgehead. The Group's composition and chain of command was anomalous. Its Night-fighter force operated jointly with 11 Group in Air Defence of Great Britain (ADGB) and its single-engined fighters were under operational control of 2nd TAF, while airfield construction was under the control of Commander 21st Army Group Royal Engineers (CAGRE).

== D-Day Order of Battle ==
The composition of 85 Group from June to August 1944 was as follows (airfields given for 6 June):

- 141 (Fighter) Wing
  - No. 91 (Nigeria) Squadron RAF at West Malling (Spitfire XIV)
  - No. 322 (Dutch) Squadron RAF at Hartford Bridge (Spitfire XIV)
- 142 (Fighter) Wing Night fighter wing
  - No. 264 (Madras Presidency) Squadron RAF at Hartford Bridge (Mosquito XIII)
  - No. 604 (County of Middlesex) Squadron AAF at Hurn (Mosquito XIII)
- 147 (Night Fighter) Wing
  - No. 29 Squadron RAF (Mosquito)
- 148 (Night Fighter) Wing
  - No. 409 Squadron RCAF (Mosquito XIII)
- 149 (Long Range Fighter) Wing
  - No. 410 Squadron RCAF at Hunsdon (Mosquito XIII)
  - No. 488 Squadron RNZAF at Zeals (Mosquito XIII)
- 150 (Fighter) Wing
  - No. 3 Squadron RAF at Newchurch (Tempest V)
  - No. 56 Squadron RAF at Newchurch (Spitfire IX LF; Tempest from 6 July)
  - No. 486 Squadron RNZAF at Newchurch (Tempest V)
  - No. 124 (Baroda) Squadron RAF at Bradwell Bay (Spitfire VII)
- Airfield Construction Wing
  - 5022, 5023, 5357 Airfield Construction Squadrons
- 1 2, 4 Beach Squadrons
- 974, 976, 980, 991 Balloon Squadrons
- 14 Port Balloon Flight

== D-Day tasks ==
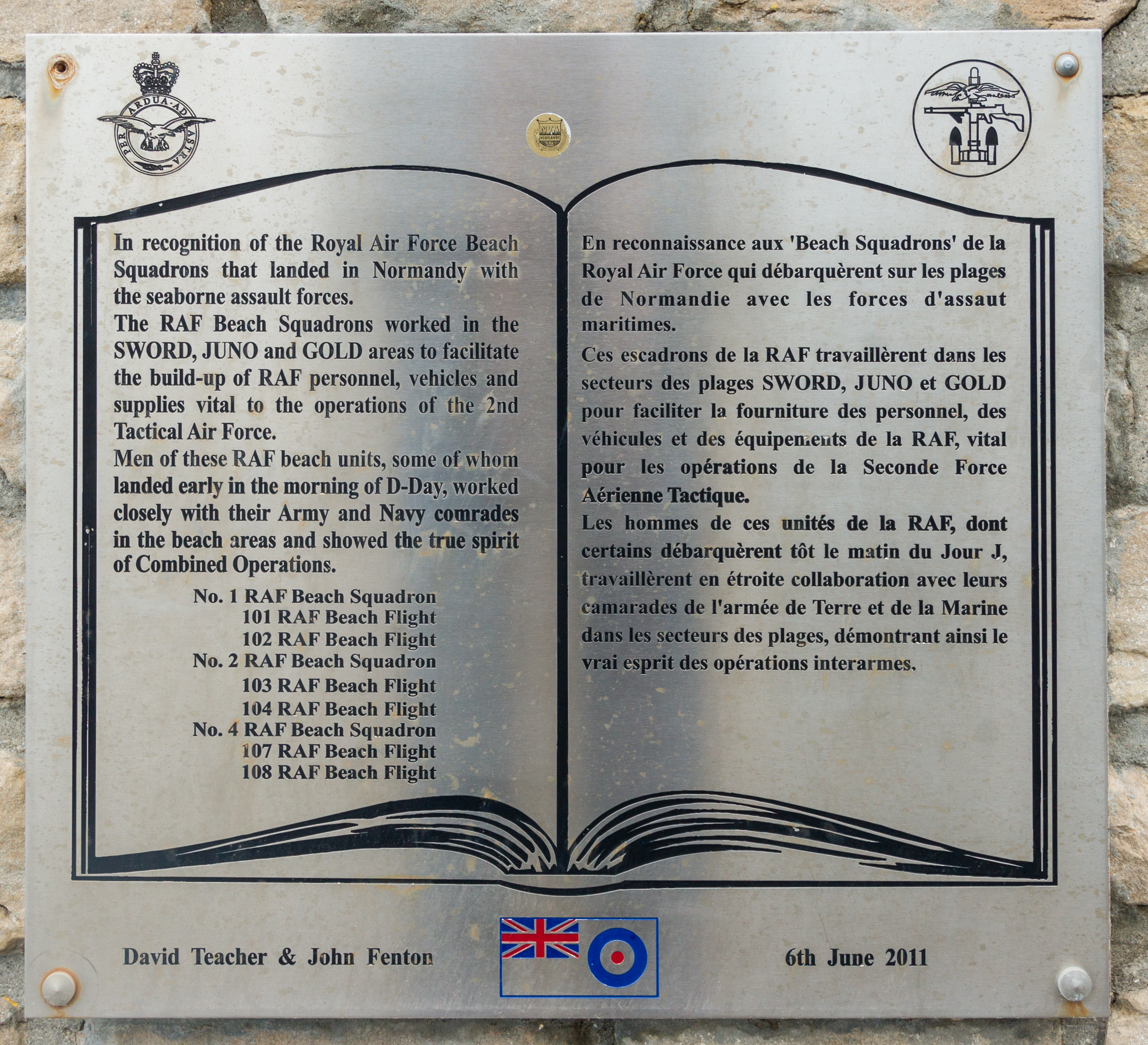
Memorial to 1, 2 and 4 Beach Sqns RAF at Arromanches

For D-Day (6 June) itself, all the available day fighters of 2nd TAF and ADGB were given specific tasks. In 85 Group, the three squadrons of 150 Wing at Newchurch were part of the 'Pool of Readiness', a rapid reaction force in case the Luftwaffe intervened in the landing operations. Meanwhile, 91, 124 and 322 Sqns were tasked with preventing Luftwaffe reconnaissance aircraft from operating over the landing area.

By nightfall on D-Day, a Ground control interception (GCI) radar station was ashore and operational in the British sector at Arromanches and was able to undertake limited control of night-fighter operations. 85 Group's Mosquitos maintained constant patrols over the beachhead and claimed to have shot down 12 of the 40 enemy aircraft plotted in the area that night, including specialist bombers of Fliegerkorps X attempting to use guided bombs against the anchorage.

== Beachhead defences ==
In the planning for Operation Overlord, 85 Group was keen to have searchlight (S/L) assistance for its night-fighters in the same way as ADGB had in the UK. Two Anti-Aircraft (AA) brigade headquarters experienced in commanding searchlights, 31st (North Midland) AA Bde and 50th S/L Bde, were to be withdrawn from Anti-Aircraft Command to join 21st Army Group's GHQ AA Troops for this purpose. A detailed plan was drawn up for a belt of S/L positions deployed from Caen to the Cherbourg peninsula. This required nine S/L batteries of 24 lights, spaced at 6000 yard intervals, six rows deep. Each battery area was to have an orbit beacon, around which up to four fighters would be positioned at varying heights. These would be allocated by fighter controllers, and the S/Ls would assist by illuminating targets and indicating raid approaches, while area boundaries would be marked by vertical S/Ls. Six S/L regiments were specially trained for this work. In practice, most of this plan was never implemented, liaison with the US Army units around Cherbourg having proved problematical once they were on the ground. The S/L brigades therefore remained in AA Command, waiting to cross to Normandy until long after D-Day.

21st Army Group did land a large number of AA units to defend the Mulberry harbour and landing beaches, dumps and bases, as well as airfields, but 85 Group placed restrictions on their firing to give its own aircraft safe passage, which caused friction between RAF and Army.

== Airfield construction ==
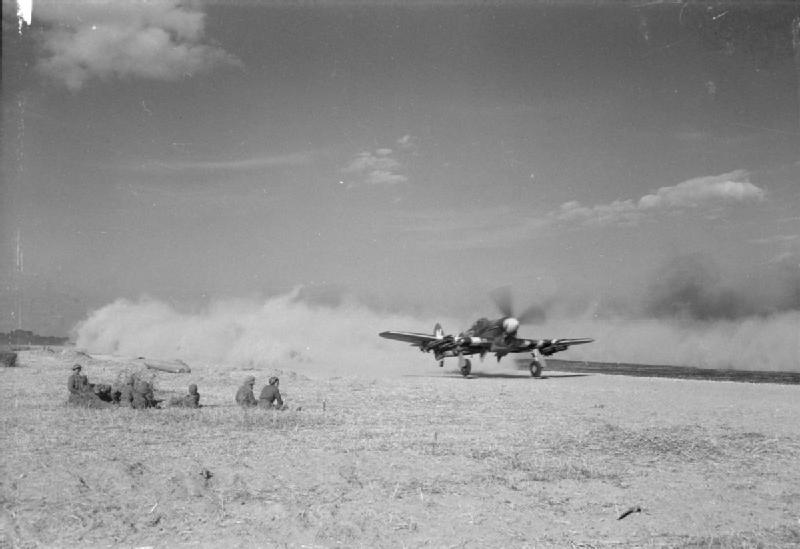
A Typhoon of 2nd TAF takes off from airstrip B2 at Bazenville, Normandy.

Airfield sites had been chosen in advance on the basis of topography and geology. The intelligence proved very accurate and no important changes to the plans had to be made. Three types were planned and constructed:

- Emergency Landing Strips with a minimum length of 1800 feet (550 metres)
- Refuelling and Rearming Strips, minimum length 3600 ft (1100 m) with two marshalling areas
- Advanced Landing Grounds, minimum length 3600 ft (1100 m) for fighters, and 5000 ft (1520 m) for fighter-bombers, with dispersal facilities for 54 aircraft.

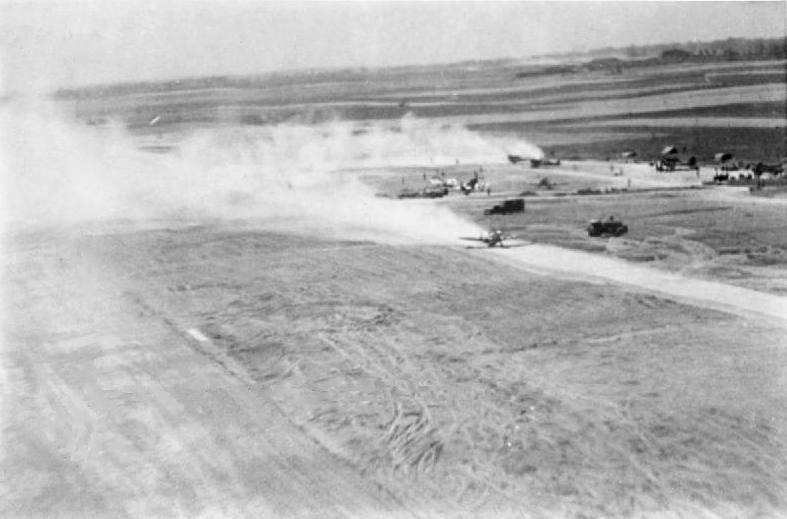
UK-based Spitfires of 2nd TAF landing to refuel at R&R strip B3 at Ste Croix-sur-Mer.

Airstrip B1 (550 m at Asnelles) was completed on D + 1 (7 June), and the first ALG (B2 at Bazenville) on 13 June.

By the beginning of July the British had constructed 12 airfields, although three or four of these were still denied to them by enemy shelling. By 5 July the whole of 83 Group of 2nd TAF was operating from strips in Normandy and by the end of August this had been increased by two wings of 84 Group. Most of 85 Base Group (now commanded by Air Vice Marshal Charles Steele) was by then in France. At that point, the RAF construction wing and the five Royal Engineers Airfield Construction Groups had constructed or repaired 23 airfields.

== Breakout ==
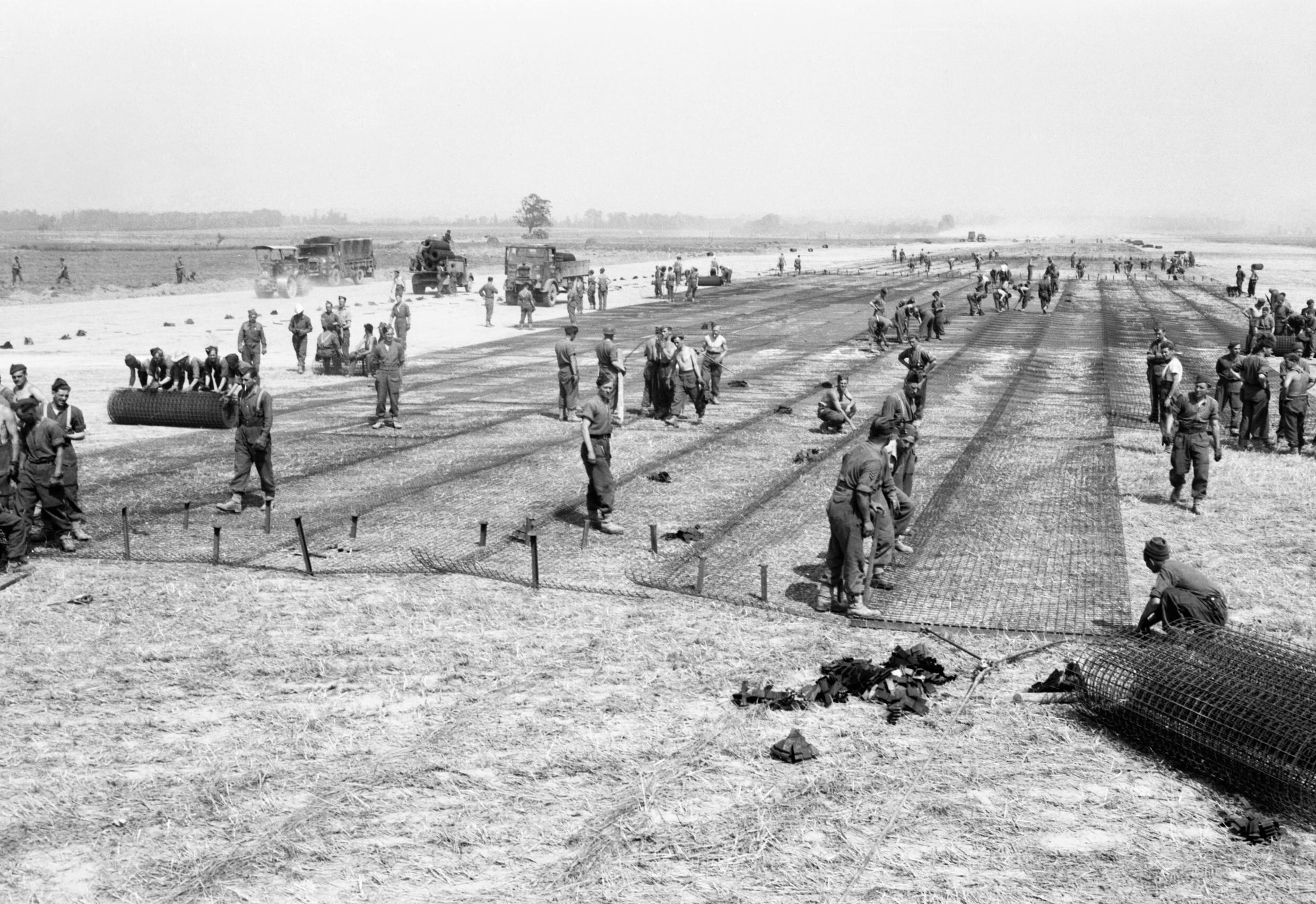
Laying square mesh track at ALG B19, Lingèvres.

At the end of August the Allies broke out of the Normandy beachhead and pursued the retreating Germans quickly across Northern France and Belgium. The Airfield Construction Groups, five under 12th Army Group RE (12 AGRE) composed of Royal Engineers and Royal Pioneer Corps and one of RAF personnel under RE command, followed closely behind 21st Army Group, repairing damaged airfields. Further back, four less mobile RAF Construction Wings carried out more permanent work and built accommodation for the RAF. During the advance from Normandy to Brussels, 30 airfields were provided in six weeks, 12 with completely new runways and 18 by repair of Luftwaffe airfields.

== Order of Battle 1944–45 ==
The composition of 85 Group from 1 September 1944 to 7 May 1945 was as follows:

- 142 Wing
  - 276 Sqn (Spitfire and Walrus Air/Sea Rescue)
- 148 Wing
  - 264 Sqn (Mosquito)
  - 409 (RCAF) Sqn (Mosquito)
- 149 Wing
  - 219 Sqn (Mosquito)
  - 410 (RCAF) Sqn (Mosquito)
  - 488 (RCAF) Sqn (Mosquito)
- 5352, 5353, 5354, 5355, 5357 Airfield Construction Wings
  - 5001, 5002, 5005, 5006, 5007, 5008, 5009, 5012, 5013, 5014, 5022, 5023 Airfield Construction Squadrons
- 159 Balloon Wing
  - 965, 967, 974, 976, 980, 991, 992, 997 Balloon Squadrons
  - 'M' Balloon Unit

== Operation Market Garden ==
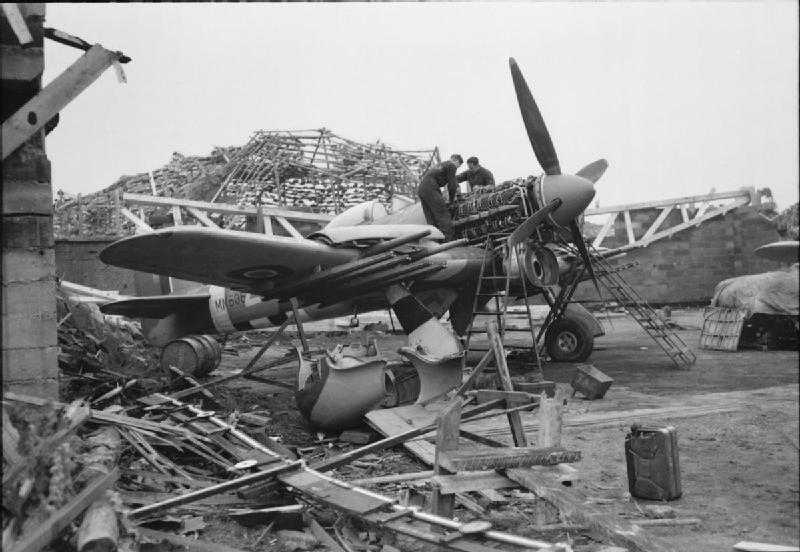
Typhoon of 2nd TAF being overhauled among the wreckage at B78 Eindhoven

The most intensive period for airfield construction during the advance came with Operation Market Garden, the combined airborne and ground operation to try to seize the bridges at Grave, Nijmegen and Arnhem. The intention was to construct a group of airfields around Arnhem to serve as a base for the further advance into Germany. The airfield construction troops were reorganised in mid-September, with 12 AGRE now consisting of 13 and 15 Airfield Construction Groups, RE, and 5357 Airfield Construction Wing, RAF. This group was concentrated by 17 September at Bourg-Léopold.

5357 Construction Wing was given responsibility for preparing an airstrip at Eindhoven. On 19 September the reconnaissance party, travelling with the leading troops of Guards Armoured Division and closely followed by one of its squadrons, reached the airfield at Eindhoven and found it badly cratered by Allied air attacks. There were still enemy troops active in woods to the west of the airfield and only one platoon of the US 101st Airborne Division available for protection. During the night the US paratroopers were withdrawn into the town and 5357 Wing took up dispositions for its own defence. Next morning the Wing sent out defensive patrols while work continued on the airfield. 12 AGRE sent up a column of plant and vehicles which arrived on site during the afternoon of 20 September. Work was interrupted by German machine gun fire on the tarmac dump, but the enemy were driven away by the Wing's patrols. Next day the leading troops of XII Corps passed to the west of the town and cleared the enemy out. All personnel could now be concentrated on the work and the airstrip was completed on 22 September. Aircraft of 2nd TAF flying from this strip were instrumental in foiling a major Luftwaffe attack on the Nijmegen bridges on 27 September.

Meanwhile, the other RAF construction wings in the rear areas were building airfields for heavier aircraft and for maintenance bases under the Director of Works, RE, who was in the unusual position of having around 6000 RAF personnel working for him.

Improvement and maintenance of Eindhoven Airfield absorbed the attention of 5357 Wing all through the winter of 1944–45. Runways, taxi-tracks, hardstandings etc were repaired with bricks and concrete, and work was done on drainage. 83 Group Typhoons operated from the airfield during the winter in support of ground operations, such as Operation Blackcock. However, much of the work began to disintegrate during the thaw in February 1945, and a 'tremendous effort of improvisation' was required to keep the airfield operational.

== Diver defences ==
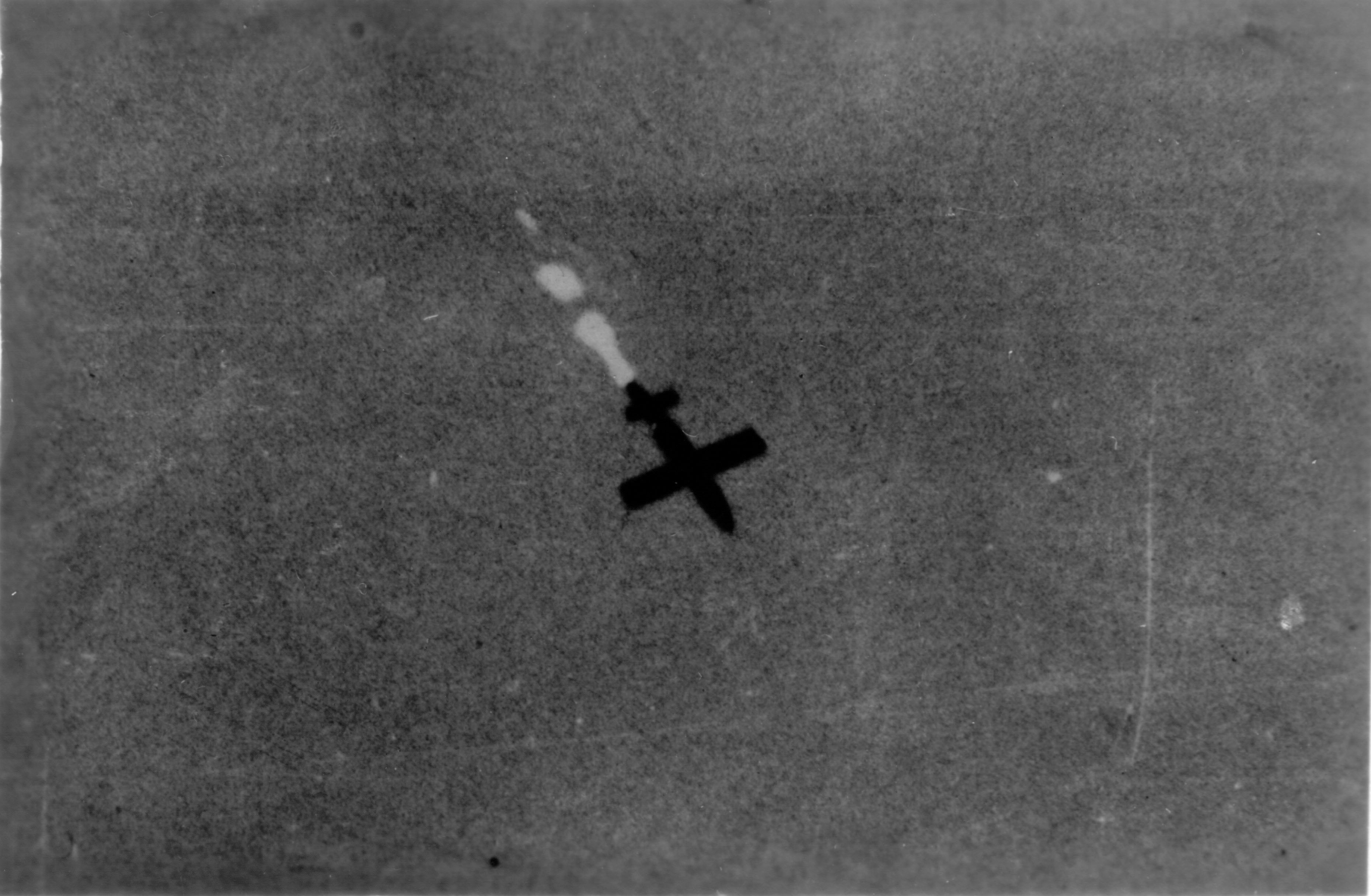
V-1 in flight over Antwerp

As early as September 1944, GHQ AA Troops drew up a plan to defend the vital port of Antwerp and the city of Brussels against the anticipated onslaught of V-1 flying bombs. AA Command and ADGB had gained considerable experience in dealing with these weapons (codenamed 'Divers') when they were launched from Northern France towards London in June–September 1944. The lessons of Operation Diver were then applied to the 'Antwerp X' and 'Brussels X' anti-Diver defences. Large numbers of AA guns were deployed across the approaches to these cities, but it was equally important to detect, track and identify the targets. Their small size, high speed and low level flight were handicaps to both radar and visual sighting.

The Antwerp X and Brussels X defences consisted of three layers of warning/reporting links, with 85 Group providing the outer line. This consisted of Wireless Observer Units or Posts (WOUs), sited 40–50 miles in front of the guns to give eight minutes' warning by radio of a missile's approach. At first these covered the south-eastern to eastern approaches, later extended round to the north. WOUs were grouped in fives and each group had a Local Warning (LW) radar. The WOUs fed their information to a control centre linked by radio or line communications to 155th AA Operations Room (AAOR). In the intermediate line the radar was manned by the Royal Artillery gunners of 80th AA Bde, and the inner belt consisted of visual observation posts to provide conformation that the tracked target was a missile. Engagements by AA guns were controlled by the AAOR. An RAF balloon barrage was also emplaced over the Scheldt Estuary against both pilotless and low level piloted air attacks.

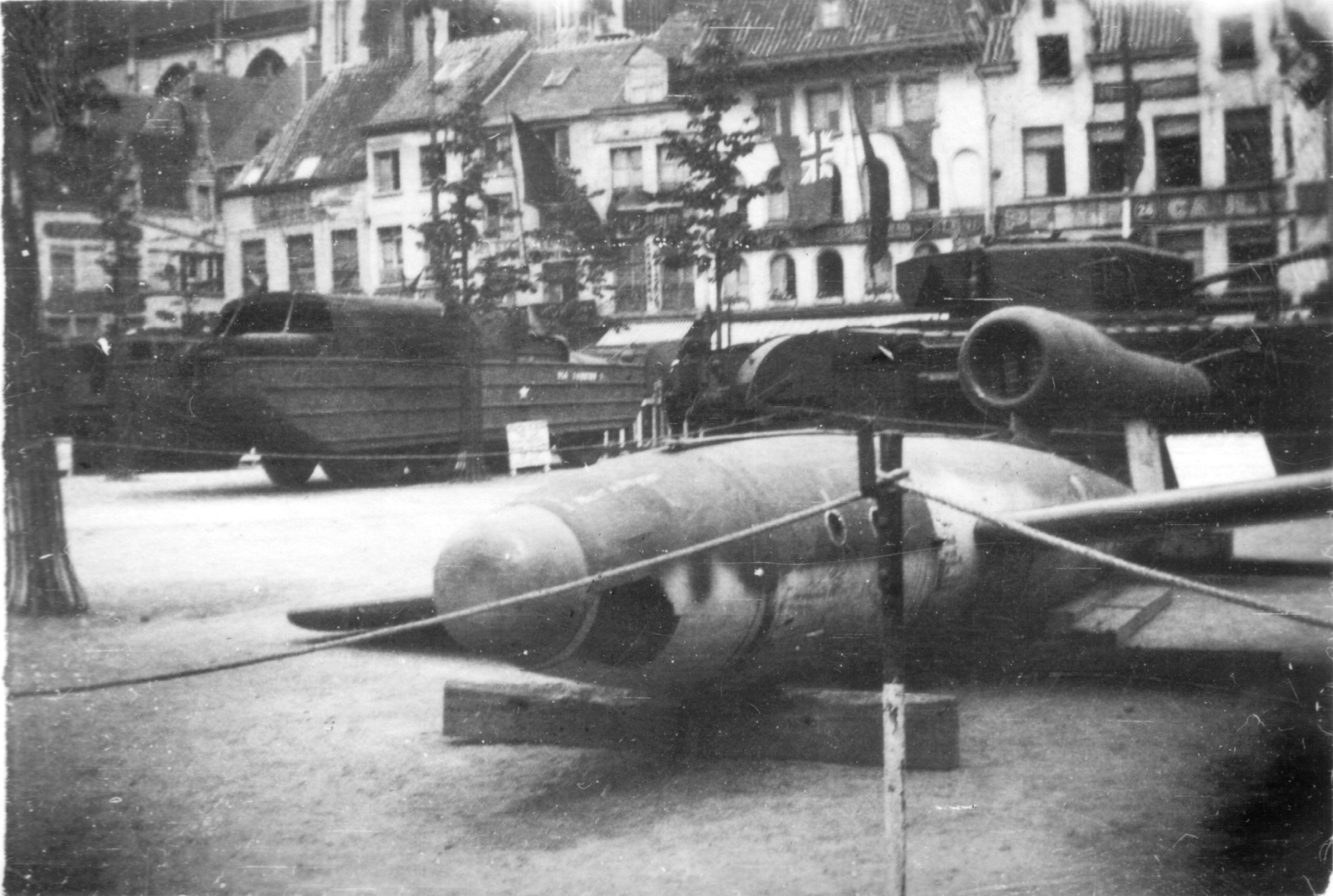
Captured V-1 displayed at Antwerp at the end of World War II.

V-1 attacks began in October. When the first missile appeared there was a 36-hour delay before 2nd TAF's controllers accepted the need to apply 'Diver' rules and free the sky up to 5000 feet for AA fire. Thereafter, flying was prohibited over the 'X' gun defences unless 'Hold Fire' had been imposed for some emergency. Both cities had airfields nearby, and Brussels required a corridor for friendly aircraft movements to the east. At night the 'X' boundaries were marked by vertical S/L beams. Infringements were so common that 'HQ 2nd TAF had to issue strongly-worded injunctions to its wings and control centres'. The V-1 campaign peaked in December 1944 and again in February 1945. At Antwerp the weekly total reached 623 missiles in February, but declined steadily thereafter. By the end of March 1945, 21st Army Group had overrun most of the V-1 launch sites and the threat was eliminated. A total of 5442 V-1s approached the Brussels/Antwerp area and 43.2 per cent were destroyed by AA fire; in the last week of action the success rate had reached 97.5 per cent.

== Subsequent history ==
After VE Day, 85 Group remained part of 2nd TAF, which became British Air Forces of Occupation in Germany in July 1945. 85 Group was reduced to the status of No. 85 Wing on 1 July 1946. It was then reformed as a Group on 1 December 1948, and disbanded again on 1 July 1950.

== Commanders ==
The following officers commanded No. 85 Group:

- Air Vice-Marshal John Cole-Hamilton, 13 February–10 July 1944
- Air Vice-Marshal Charles Steele, 10 July 1944 – 26 April 1945
- Air Vice-Marshal Dermot Boyle, 26 April–12 July 1945
- Air Vice-Marshal Anthony Paxton, 12 July 1945–June 1946
- Air Commodore Leslie Cannon, June–July 1946
- Air Commodore Cyril Adams, 1948
- Air Commodore Philip Jones, 1 October 1949 – 1 July 1950

== External sources ==
- Air of Authority – A History of RAF Organisation.
