= Dermot Boyle =

Marshal of the Royal Air Force (1904-1993)

Marshal of the Royal Air Force Sir Dermot Boyle GCB KCVO KBE AFC
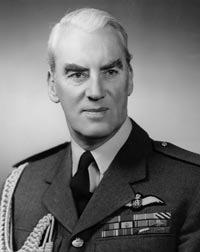
- Boyle in 1956
- Born: 2 October 1904; Rathdowney, Queen's County, Ireland
- Died: 5 May 1993 (aged 88); Sway, Hampshire, England
- Military career
- Allegiance: United Kingdom
- Branch: Royal Air Force
- Service years: 1922–1960
- Rank: Marshal of the Royal Air Force
- Commands: Chief of the Air Staff (1956–59); Fighter Command (1953–56); No.1 (Bomber) Group (1951–53); RAF Staff College (1947–48); No.11 Group (1945–46); No. 85 (Base) Group (1945); RAF Stradishall (1942–43); No. 83 Squadron (1937, 1940–41)
- Conflicts: Second World War; Suez Crisis
- Awards: Knight Grand Cross of the Order of the Bath; Knight Commander of the Royal Victorian Order; Knight Commander of the Order of the British Empire; Air Force Cross; Mentioned in Despatches (3); Commander of the Order of the Crown (Belgium); Croix de Guerre (Belgium)

Marshal of the Royal Air Force Sir Dermot Alexander Boyle, GCB, KCVO, KBE, AFC (2 October 1904 – 5 May 1993) was a senior officer in the Royal Air Force. He served in the Second World War initially as a staff officer with the Advanced Air Striking Force in Reims in which capacity he organised the evacuation of the Force through Brest in May 1940. His war service included tours as a bomber squadron commander, as a station commander and also as an air group commander. He was Chief of the Air Staff in the late 1950s and, in that role, deployed British air power during the Suez Crisis in October 1956 and defended the RAF against the views of Duncan Sandys, the Minister for Defence, who believed that the V bomber force rendered manned fighter aircraft redundant.

== RAF career ==
Born the son of Alexander Francis and Anna Maria (née Harpur) Boyle, Dermot was brought up in Abbeyleix, Queen's County and educated at St Columba's College, Dublin.

Boyle joined the Royal Air Force on 14 September 1922 as a flight cadet at the Royal Air Force College Cranwell. On successfully passing through the college, he was commissioned as a pilot officer on 31 July 1924 and immediately posted to No. 17 Squadron at RAF Hawkinge where he flew Snipes. He transferred to No. 1 Squadron at RAF Hinaidi in Iraq to undertake air policing duties in December 1925 and, having been promoted to flying officer on 31 January 1926, he transferred again this time to No. 6 Squadron at RAF Mosul also in Iraq in November 1926.

Boyle attended the Flying Instructor's Course at the Central Flying School in March 1927 and then became a Qualified Flying Instructor there the following month. Dermot Boyle and Richard Atcherley together formed the school's display team while they were resident at the Central Flying School at this time. Boyle was made Assistant Adjutant at No. 601 (County of London) Squadron at RAF Hendon on 5 October 1929 and was promoted to flight lieutenant on 13 October 1929.

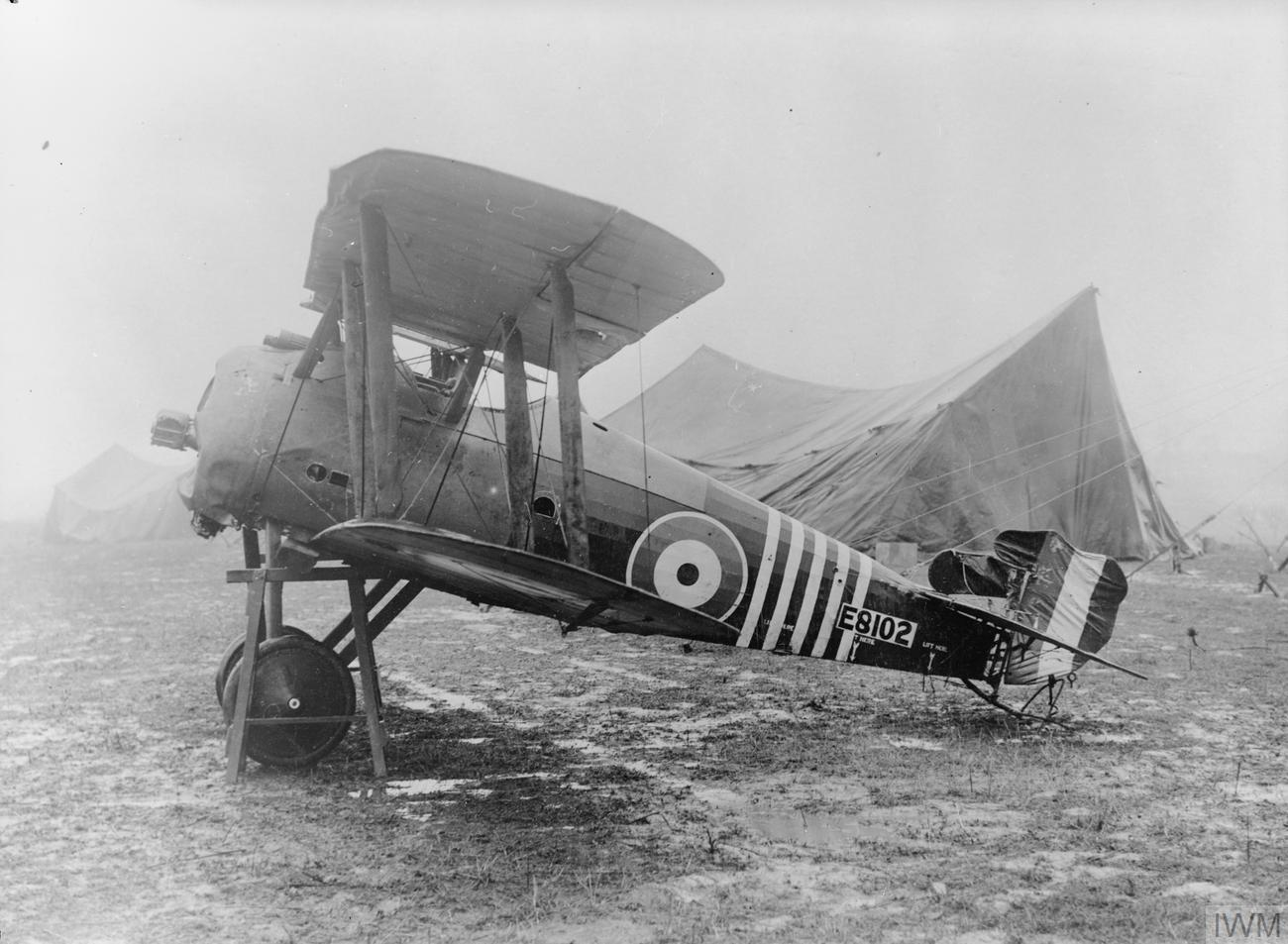
Sopwith Snipe, a type flown by Boyle in the 1920s

Boyle became a Qualified Flying Instructor at the Royal Air Force College Cranwell in January 1930 and then returned to No. 601 (County of London) Squadron as Adjutant in January 1931. He joined the Personnel Staff at Headquarters RAF India in April 1933 and then attended the RAF Staff College in 1936. Promoted to squadron leader on 1 October 1936, he became Officer Commanding No. 83 Squadron at RAF Turnhouse flying Hind bombers in January 1937. He went on to be Chief Flying Instructor at the Royal Air Force College Cranwell in July 1937 and was awarded the Air Force Cross on 8 June 1939.

Boyle served in the Second World War, initially as a Staff Officer at Headquarters of the Advanced Air Striking Force in Reims, and was promoted to the temporary rank of wing commander on 1 January 1940 (made permanent in April 1942). In May 1940, when the German Army broke through, he organised the evacuation of the Force through Brest. He joined the Air Staff responsible for operations at Headquarters RAF Bomber Command in June 1940 and again became Officer Commanding No. 83 Squadron in November 1940 now based at RAF Scampton and flying Hampden bombers. He went on to be Assistant Secretary of the Committee of Imperial Defence in February 1941 and was mentioned in despatches on 1 January 1941 and again on 24 September 1941. Promoted to the temporary rank of group captain on 1 December 1941, he became Station Commander at RAF Stradishall in January 1942 and Senior Air Staff Officer at No. 83 Group in May 1943. He was mentioned in despatches again on 2 June 1943 and promoted to group captain on a war substantive basis on 17 November 1943.

Boyle was appointed Air Aide-de-Camp to the King on 1 January 1944 and a Commander of the Order of the British Empire in the 1945 New Year Honours. He became Air Officer Commanding No. 85 (Base) Group, responsible for the various support units within Second Tactical Air Force, with the acting rank of air vice marshal, on 26 April 1945 and went on to be Air Officer Commanding No. 11 Group in July 1945. He appointed a Commander of the Order of the Crown with Palms and awarded the Croix de Guerre 1940 with Palms by the Prince Regent of Belgium on 11 July 1947 for his role in liberating Belgium.

After the War Boyle stayed in the RAF, being appointed a Companion of the Order of the Bath in the 1946 New Year Honours and relinquishing his rank of acting air vice marshal on 19 March 1946. He attended Imperial Defence College in 1946 and became Assistant Commandant of the RAF Staff College, Bracknell in January 1947 before being promoted to the air commodore on 1 July 1947. He became Director-General of Personnel at the Air Ministry with the acting rank of air vice marshal on 26 July 1948 and Director General of Manning at the Air Ministry in August 1949. He went on to be Air Officer Commanding No.1 (Bomber) Group in April 1951 and was advanced to Knight Commander of the Order of the British Empire in the 1953 New Year Honours. He became Air Officer Commanding-in-Chief at RAF Fighter Command with the acting rank of air marshal on 7 April 1953 and, having attended the coronation of Queen Elizabeth II in June 1953, he was appointed a Knight Commander of the Royal Victorian Order on 16 July 1953 and confirmed in the rank of air marshal on 1 January 1954.

Boyle became Chief of the Air Staff and was promoted to air chief marshal on 1 January 1956, the first graduate of the RAF College Cranwell to be appointed to this post. In this role he deployed British air power during the Suez Crisis in October 1956 and defended the RAF against the views of Duncan Sandys, the Minister for Defence, who believed that the V bomber force rendered manned fighter aircraft redundant. He was advanced to Knight Grand Cross of the Order of the Bath in the 1957 New Year Honours and promoted to the rank of Marshal of the Royal Air Force on 1 January 1958 before retiring in January 1960.

== Later career ==
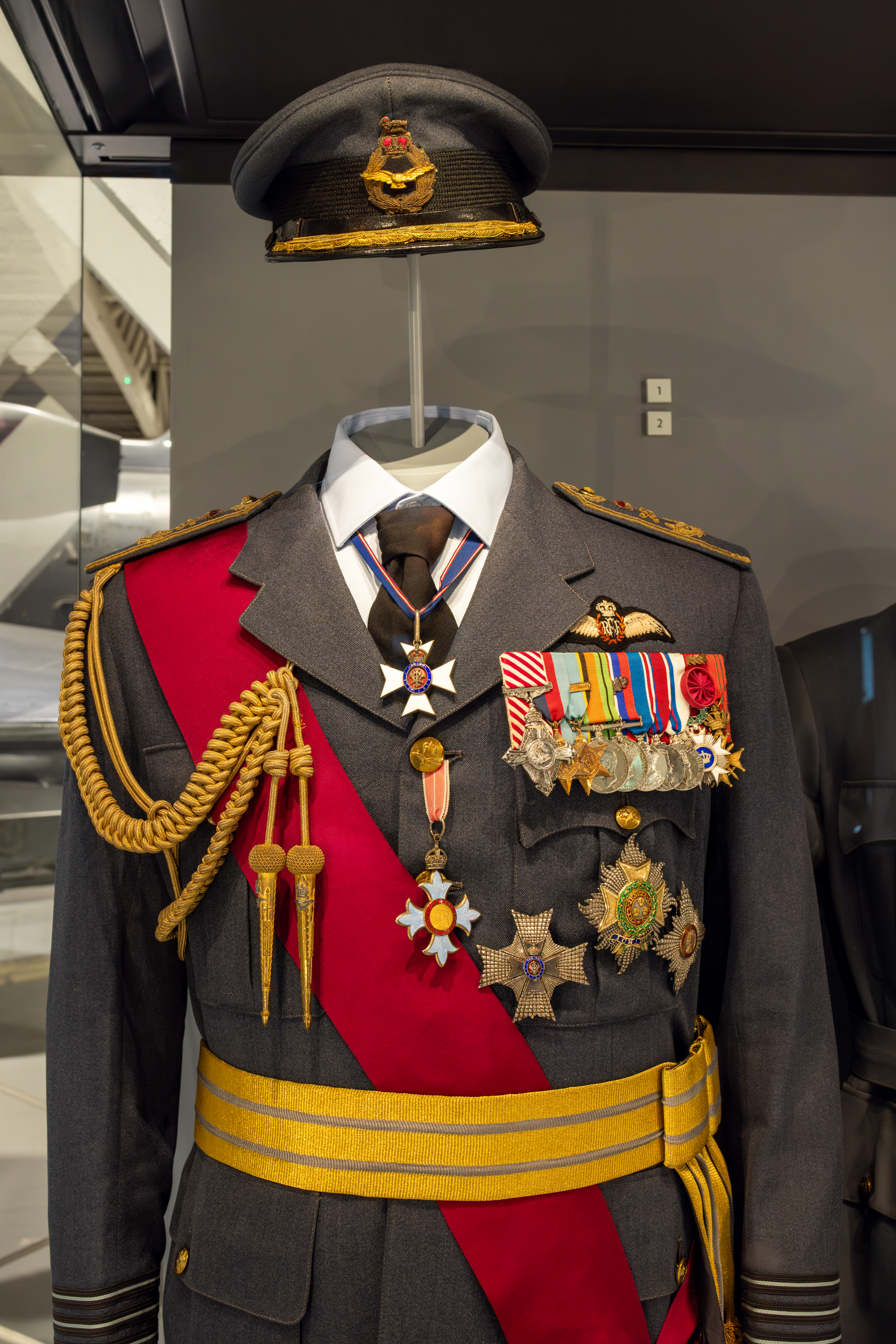
Boyle's uniform and medals at the Royal Air Force Museum London

In retirement Boyle became vice-chairman of the British Aircraft Corporation. He was instrumental in founding the RAF Museum at Hendon and became the first chairman of its trustees. He was also vice-chairman of the RAF Benevolent Fund for most of the 1970s and President of the Royal Air Force Club. He died at Sway in Hampshire on 5 May 1993.

== Family ==
Boyle married Una Carey in 1931; they had two sons and a daughter.

== Sources ==
- Probert, Henry (1991). High Commanders of the Royal Air Force. HMSO. ISBN 978-0-11-772635-2.

Military offices
Preceded by John Cole-Hamilton	Air Officer Commanding No. 11 Group; 1945–1946	Succeeded by Somerled Macdonald
Preceded by Edmund Hudleston	Air Officer Commanding No. 1 (Bomber) Group; 1951–1953	Succeeded by Sir John Whitley
Preceded by Sir Basil Embry	Commander-in-Chief Fighter Command; 1953–1956	Succeeded by Sir Hubert Patch
Preceded by Sir William Dickson	Chief of the Air Staff; 1956–1959	Succeeded by Sir Thomas Pike
