= Neil Cameron, Baron Cameron of Balhousie =

Marshal of the Royal Air Force (1920–1985)

Marshal of the Royal Air Force The Right Honourable The Lord Cameron of Balhousie KT GCB CBE DSO DFC
- Marshal of the Royal Air Force The Lord Cameron of Balhousie
- Born: 8 July 1920; Perth, Scotland
- Died: 29 January 1985 (aged 64); London, England
- Spouse: Patricia Louise Asprey (m. 1947)
- Military career
- Allegiance: United Kingdom
- Branch: Royal Air Force
- Service years: 1939–1979
- Rank: Marshal of the Royal Air Force
- Commands: Chief of the Defence Staff; Chief of the Air Staff; No. 46 Group; RAF Abingdon; No. 258 Squadron
- Conflicts: Second World War
- Awards: Knight of the Order of the Thistle; Knight Grand Cross of the Order of the Bath; Commander of the Order of the British Empire; Companion of the Distinguished Service Order; Distinguished Flying Cross; Mentioned in Despatches
- Other work

Member of the House of Lords
- Lord Temporal
- Life peerage 14 March 1983 – 29 January 1985

Personal details
- Party: Crossbencher

Marshal of the Royal Air Force Neil Cameron, Baron Cameron of Balhousie, KT, GCB, CBE, DSO, DFC (8 July 1920 – 29 January 1985) was a senior officer in the Royal Air Force. He fought in the Second World War as a fighter pilot taking part in the Battle of Britain, the Battle of Alam el Halfa, the First Battle of El Alamein and the Second Battle of El Alamein and then in operations in Burma. He served as Chief of the Air Staff in the late 1970s advising the British Government on the reinforcement of the British garrison in Belize which was under threat from Guatemala at the time. He also served as the Chief of the Defence Staff at the end of the 1970s in which role he secured pay comparability for services personnel involved in civil support during the firemen's strike, visited the People's Republic of China and lectured extensively on the Soviet air threat.

== Early life ==
The only son and younger child of Neil Cameron (a retired company sergeant major in the Seaforth Highlanders) and his wife, Isabella Cameron (née Stewart), Cameron was brought up by his mother and grandfather in Perth, his father having died when he was three weeks old. Cameron attended the Northern District School and took up employment with the Commercial Bank of Scotland in the Fife town of Newburgh in 1937.

== RAF career ==
Cameron joined the Royal Air Force Volunteer Reserve in May 1939 and started his flying training at No. 3 Initial Training Wing at Hastings. From March to September 1940, he completed his elementary pilot training, advanced training and operational training before being posted to No. 1 Squadron at RAF Wittering as a sergeant pilot flying Hurricanes. He was posted to No. 17 Squadron at RAF Martlesham Heath in October 1940 in time to take part in the final stages of the Battle of Britain.

Cameron joined No. 134 Squadron at Murmansk in northern Russia in July 1941 and was granted a commission with the war substantive rank of pilot officer on 31 July 1941. Off the coast of northern Russia, he was required to take-off from a Royal Navy aircraft carrier without practice. Promoted to the war substantive rank of flying officer on 4 March 1942, he joined No. 213 Squadron, part of the Desert Air Force, in August 1942, and he was promoted to the war substantive rank of squadron leader on 4 March 1943. In this role, he took part in the Battle of Alam el Halfa in September 1942, the First Battle of El Alamein in July 1942 and the Second Battle of El Alamein in October 1942.

Cameron went on to be an adviser to No. 335 (Hellenic) Squadron in April 1943 and, having been mentioned in despatches on 2 June 1943, he joined the Air Staff responsible for Fighter Operations at Headquarters No. 224 Group in October 1943. He became Officer Commanding No. 258 Squadron operating over Burma in November 1944. Most missions were ground attack in support of the army, but on 11 February 1945 Cameron shot down a Nakajima Ki-44 fighter, while escorting bombers over Rangoon. He was awarded the Distinguished Flying Cross on 21 November 1944 and appointed a Companion of the Distinguished Service Order on 2 October 1945.

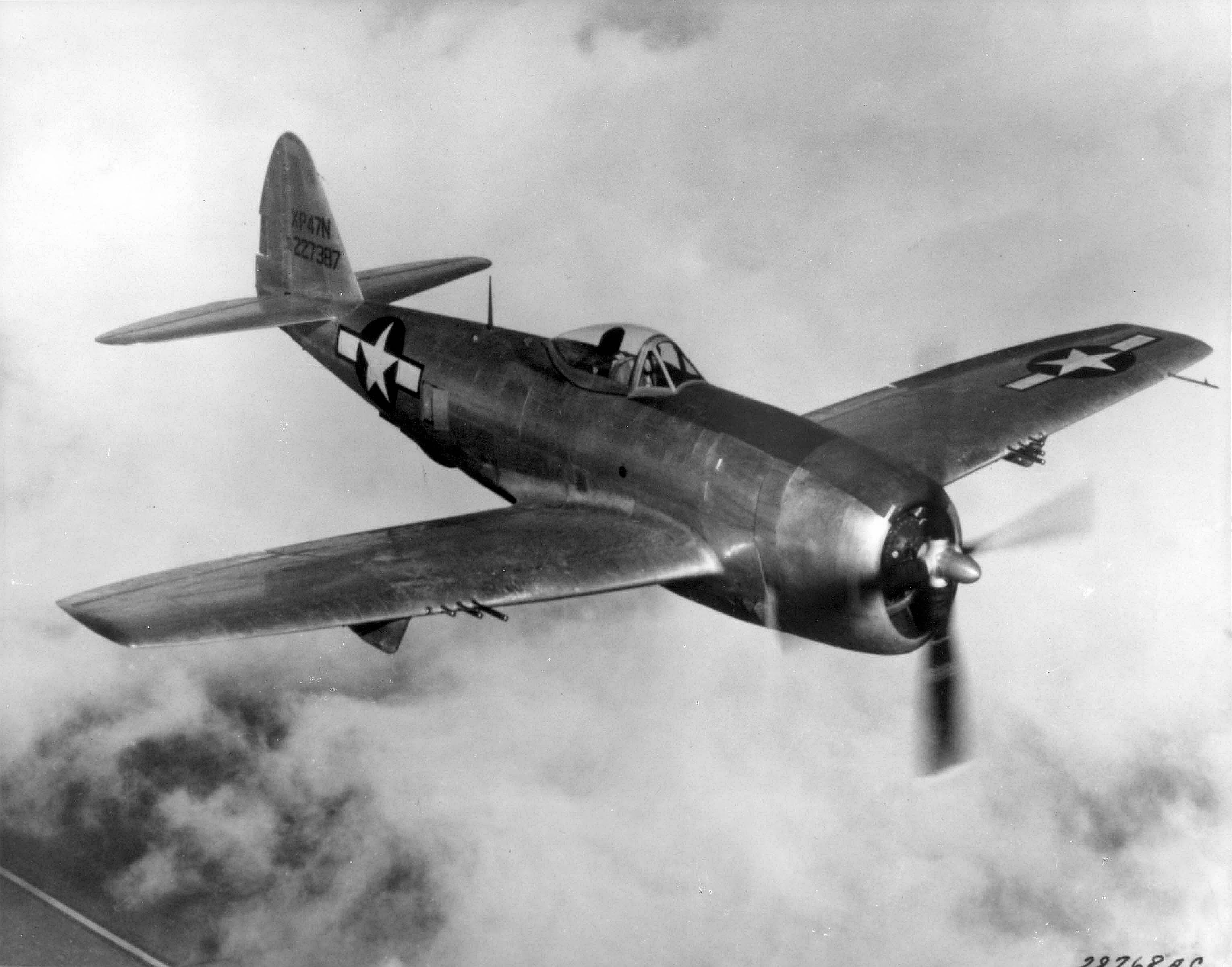
P-47 Thunderbolt, a type flown by Cameron in Burma during the Second World War

Cameron transferred from the RAF Volunteer Reserve to the Royal Air Force after the War ended and was given a permanent commission as a flight lieutenant on 1 September 1945. He became an instructor at the School of Air Support at Old Sarum in October 1945 and went on to be RAF Liaison Officer at Headquarters Rhine Army in April 1948. He attended RAF Staff College in 1949 and later that year joined the Air Staff in the Directorate of Organisation at the Air Ministry.

Cameron was promoted to squadron leader on 1 January 1950 but spent much of that year and the next incapacitated because of a severe case of infective endocarditis. He was selected for Aircrew Selection Duties at the Air Ministry in January 1952 before joining the Directing Staff at the RAF Staff College in December 1953. Having been promoted to wing commander on 1 January 1956, but still recovering from illness, he became Officer Commanding the University of London Air Squadron in August 1956. He became Personal Staff Officer to the Chief of the Air Staff in November 1958, and having been promoted to group captain on 1 July 1960, he became Officer Commanding RAF Abingdon in November 1960. He attended Imperial Defence College in 1963 and became Principal Staff Officer to Deputy Supreme Allied Commander Europe at the end of the year.

=== Air officer ===
Promoted to air commodore on 1 July 1964, Cameron joined the Staff at the RAF College Cranwell in February 1965 becoming Assistant Commandant there a few months later. He became RAF Member of Programme Evaluation Group in September 1966, and having been appointed Commander of the Order of the British Empire in the 1967 Birthday Honours, he became Assistant Chief of Defence Staff in February 1968. Promoted to air vice marshal on 1 July 1968, he became Senior Air Staff Officer at Headquarters Air Support Command in September 1970.

Appointed Companion of the Order of the Bath in the 1971 New Year Honours, Cameron became Deputy Commander RAF Germany in December 1972 and Air Officer Commanding No. 46 Group in December 1973. Then, having been promoted to air marshal on 1 July 1974, he became Air Member for Personnel in October 1974. He was advanced to Knight Commander of the Order of the Bath in the 1975 New Year Honours. He was promoted to air chief marshal on 1 November 1975 and advanced to Knight Grand Cross of the Order of the Bath in the 1976 Birthday Honours.

=== Chief of Air Staff ===
Cameron was appointed Air Aide-de-Camp to the Queen on 6 August 1976 and Chief of the Air Staff on 7 August 1976. As Chief of the Air Staff, he advised the British Government on the reinforcement of the British garrison in Belize which was under threat from Guatemala at the time. He was promoted to Marshal of the Royal Air Force on 31 July 1977.

=== Chief of Defence Staff ===
Cameron became Chief of the Defence Staff on 31 August 1977. In that role, he secured pay comparability for services personnel involved in civil support during the firemen's strike, visited the People's Republic of China and lectured extensively on the Soviet air threat. He retired in August 1979.

== Later life ==
In retirement, Cameron became Principal of King's College London, which awarded him an honorary LLD degree. On 14 March 1983, he was created a life peer as Baron Cameron of Balhousie, of Balhousie in the District of Perth and Kinross. He was appointed a Knight of the Order of the Thistle on 30 November 1983. He also became Chairman of the trustees of the RAF Museum. He died of cancer at the Middlesex Hospital in London on 29 January 1985.

== Arms ==
Coat of arms of Neil Cameron, Baron Cameron of Balhousie
Coronet That of a Baron Motto In Media Res Orders Order of the Thistle

== Personal life ==
In 1947, he married Patricia Louise Asprey (1922–2013) ; they had a son and a daughter. His interests included rugby.

== Sources ==
- Probert, Henry (1991). High Commanders of the Royal Air Force. HMSO. ISBN 0-11-772635-4.

Military offices
Preceded by Sir Denis Crowley-Milling	Air Officer Commanding No. 46 Group; 1973–1974	Succeeded by Norman Hoad
Preceded by Sir Harold Martin	Air Member for Personnel; 1974–1976	Succeeded by Sir John Aiken
Preceded by Sir Andrew Humphrey	Chief of the Air Staff; 1976–1977	Succeeded by Sir Michael Beetham
Preceded by Sir Edward Ashmore	Chief of the Defence Staff; 1977–1979	Succeeded by Sir Terence Lewin
Academic offices
Preceded by Richard Way	Principal of King's College London; 1980–1985	Succeeded by Lord Sutherland of Houndwood
