= John Cole-Hamilton =

Royal Air Force Air Vice-Marshal (1894-1945)

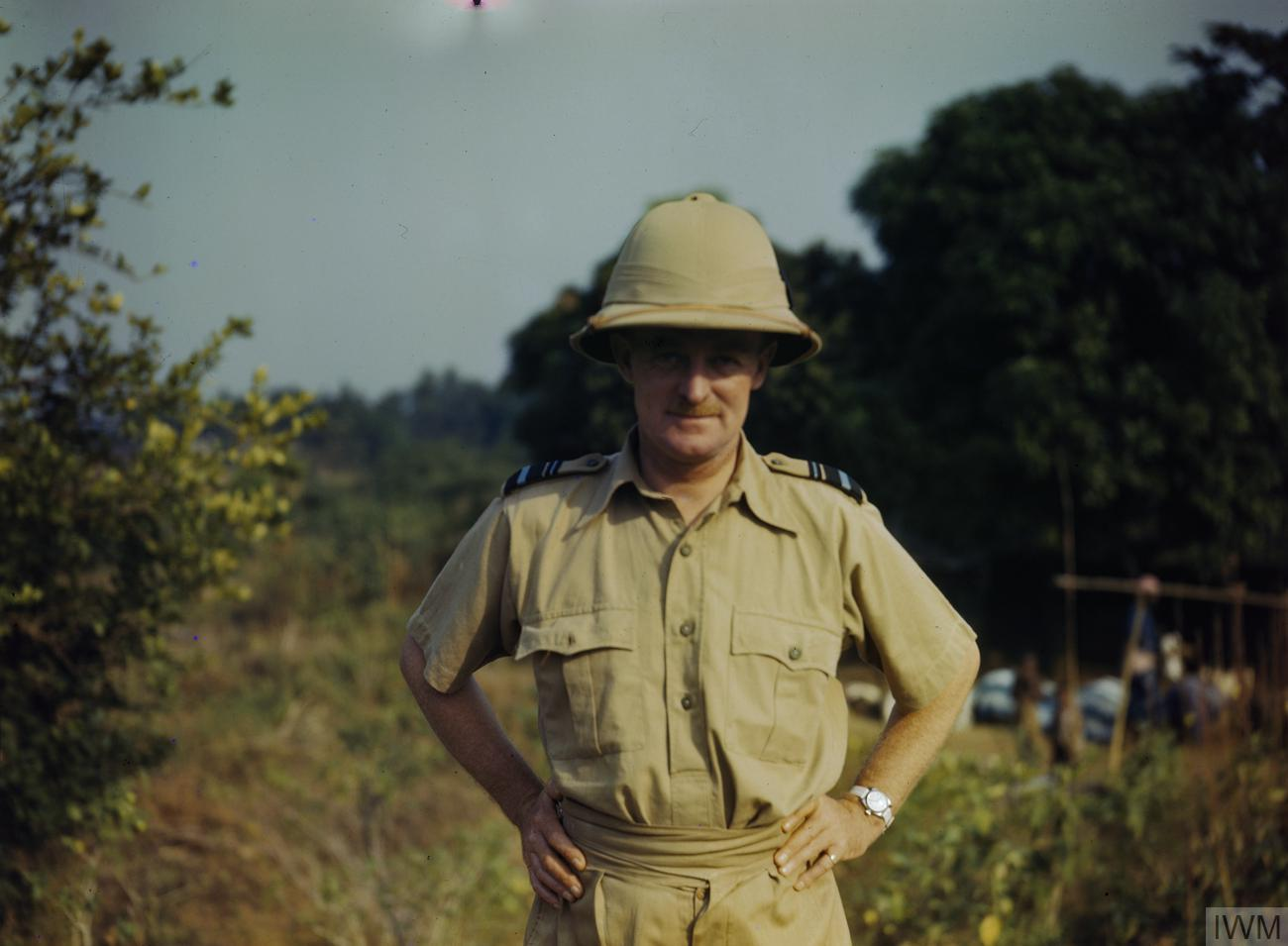
- John Cole-Hamilton
- Born: 1 December 1894
- Died: 22 August 1945 (aged 50)
- Military career
- Allegiance: United Kingdom
- Branch: Royal Navy (1912–18); Royal Air Force (1918–45)
- Service years: 1912–1945
- Rank: Air Vice Marshal
- Commands: No. 11 (Fighter) Group (1944–45); No. 10 (Fighter) Group (1944); No. 85 (Base) Group (1944); AHQ West Africa (1942–44); RAF in Northern Ireland (1941–42); No. 70 (Army Co-operation Training) Group (1940–41); School of Army Co-operation (1938–40); No. 1 (Indian Wing) Station (1937–38); No. 13 Squadron (1929–31); No. 20 Squadron (1925–26)
- Conflicts: World War I World War II
- Awards: Companion of the Order of the Bath; Commander of the Order of the British Empire; Mentioned in Despatches (2)

Air Vice Marshal John Beresford Cole-Hamilton, CB, CBE (1 December 1894 – 22 August 1945) was an airship pilot in the Royal Naval Air Service during the First World War and a senior Royal Air Force commander during the Second World War.

== Family ==
Cole-Hamilton was the younger son of John Isaac Cole-Hamilton and Elinor Bourne Royds. The Cole-Hamiltons descend from Arthur Cole-Hamilton, a younger son of the Irish politician John Cole, 1st Baron Mountflorence, whose eldest son and heir, William, was created Earl of Enniskillen.

== Second World War ==
During the early months of the war, Cole-Hamilton was Commandant at the RAF's School of Army Co-operation. In 1940, he was sent to France, taking up the post of Air Officer Administration on the Air Component of the British Expeditionary Force. Cole-Hamilton received a temporary promotion to air commodore in July 1940. With the evacuation of the British Expeditionary Force, Cole-Hamilton returned to Great Britain. In December, Cole-Hamilton returned to an army co-operation training role, being appointed Air Officer Commanding (AOC) No. 70 (Army Co-operation Training) Group.

In November 1941, Cole-Hamilton was appointed AOC of the RAF in Northern Ireland. October 1942 saw Cole-Hamilton appointed AOC of the Air Headquarters in West Africa. Returning to Great Britain in February 1944, he was appointed AOC of No. 85 (Base) Group. In July he became AOC of No. 10 (Fighter) Group and in November he was appointed AOC of No. 11 (Fighter) Group, holding command until July 1945.

Cole-Hamilton died aged 50 on 22 August 1945, less than four months after the end of the war in Europe, and was buried in St Giles' churchyard, Bradford-on-Tone, Somerset.

Military offices
Preceded by Hugh Saunders	Air Officer Commanding No. 11 (Fighter) Group; 1944–1945	Succeeded by Dermot Boyle
