= Marshal of the Royal Air Force =

Highest rank in the Royal Air Force (RAF)

- Shoulder board and sleeve insignia with royal cypher

- Masthead distinguishing flag

- Motor car star plate
- Country: United Kingdom
- Service branch: Royal Air Force
- Abbreviation: Mshl of RAF / MRAF
- Rank group: Officers of air rank
- Rank: Five-star rank
- NATO rank code: OF-10
- Formation: 1927
- Next lower rank: Air chief marshal
- Equivalent ranks: Admiral of the Fleet (RN); Field Marshal (British Army)

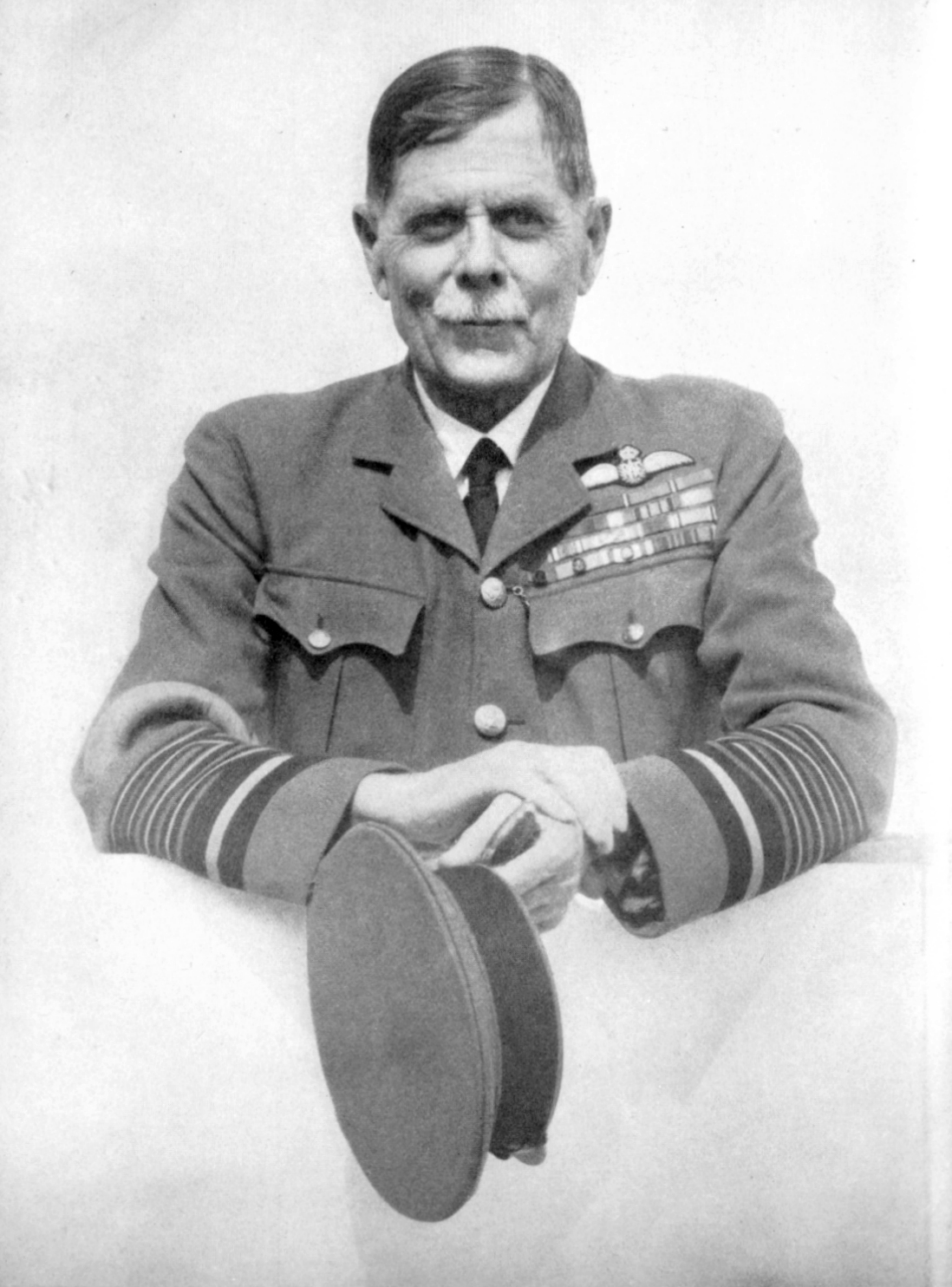
Marshal of the Royal Air Force Sir Hugh Trenchard.

Marshal of the Royal Air Force (MRAF) is the highest rank in the United Kingdom's Royal Air Force (RAF). In peacetime it was granted to RAF officers in the appointment of Chief of the Defence Staff, and to retired Chiefs of the Air Staff, who were promoted to it on their last day of service. While surviving Marshals of the RAF retain the rank for life, the highest rank to which officers on active service are promoted is now air chief marshal. Although general promotions to Marshal of the Royal Air Force have been discontinued since the British defence cuts of the 1990s, further promotions to the rank may still be made in wartime, for members of the Royal Family and certain very senior RAF air officers in peacetime at the discretion of the monarch; all such promotions in peacetime are only honorary, however. In 2012, the then Prince of Wales was promoted to the rank in recognition of his support for his mother, Queen Elizabeth II, in her capacity as head of the armed forces (commander-in-chief), while in 2014 Lord Stirrup, who had served as Chief of the Air Staff and Chief of the Defence Staff for over seven years, was also promoted.

Marshal of the Royal Air Force is a five-star rank with a NATO ranking code of OF-10, equivalent to an admiral of the fleet in the Royal Navy or a field marshal in the British Army.

The rank was instituted in 1919. The first officer to receive it was Sir Hugh Trenchard in 1927. Since that time, including Trenchard, there have been 27 holders of the rank. Of those, 22 have been professional RAF officers and five have been senior members of the British royal family. King George V did not formally hold the rank of marshal of the RAF; rather he assumed the title of Chief of the Royal Air Force. In this capacity from time to time he wore RAF uniform with the rank insignia of a marshal of the RAF. He first publicly wore such uniform in 1935, the year before his death.

Excluding monarchs and other members of the Royal Family, the only two RAF officers ever to have held the rank without serving as Chief of the Air Staff were Lord Douglas of Kirtleside and Sir Arthur Harris. Both held high command during the Second World War. Harris was Air Officer Commanding-in-Chief Bomber Command and Douglas was Air Officer Commanding-in-Chief Fighter Command, Middle East Command and Coastal Command.

== Origins ==
Prior to the creation of the RAF's officer rank titles in 1919, it was proposed that by analogy with field marshal, the highest rank title should be air marshal. It was later decided to use the rank of air marshal as an equivalent rank to lieutenant general and "marshal of the air" was put forward as the highest RAF rank. This new rank title was opposed by the then Chief of the Imperial General Staff, Sir Henry Wilson, who considered that the title was "ridiculous". However, the Chief of the Air Staff, Sir Hugh Trenchard was unmoved and the title was adopted. Though never held by a Royal Air Force officer, the rank title of marshal of the air lasted until April 1925, when it was changed to marshal of the Royal Air Force. Questioned in the House of Commons, Secretary of State for Air Sir Samuel Hoare stated that the reason for the change in title was that marshal of the air was "somewhat indefinite in character" and the new title was deemed more appropriate. It has also been reported that King George V was not happy with the title of marshal of the air, feeling it might imply attributes which should properly be reserved for God.

== Insignia, command flag and star plate ==
The rank insignia consists of four narrow light blue bands (each on a slightly wider black band) above a light blue band on a broad black band. This insignia is derived from the sleeve lace of an admiral of the fleet and is worn on both the lower sleeves of the tunic or on the shoulders of the flying suit or the service working dress uniform. Marshals of the Royal Air Force wear shoulder boards with their service dress at ceremonial events. These shoulder boards show the air officer's eagle surrounded by a wreath, two crossed marshal's batons and, from the coronation of Queen Elizabeth II until her death in 2022, the St Edward's Crown representing royal authority. From the accession of Charles III in 2022 and also prior to 1953, the Tudor Crown (sometimes called the King's Crown) has been used.

The command flag of a marshal of the Royal Air Force has a broad red horizontal band in the centre with a thinner red band on each side of it.

The vehicle star plate for a marshal of the Royal Air Force depicts five white stars (marshal of the Royal Air Force is equivalent to a five-star rank) on an air force blue background.

The rank insignia and flag exists in some other air forces for equivalent ranks. The rank title differs slightly, often being a variation on marshal of the air force, usually with the name of the relevant air force in place of the words 'Royal Air Force'. A notable example of this practice is the rank of marshal of the Royal Australian Air Force.

Marshal of the RAF sleeve insignia

Marshal of the RAF shoulder board

Marshal of the RAF sleeve mess insignia

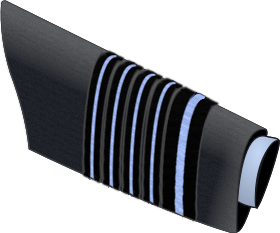
Marshal of the RAF sleeve on No. 1 Service Dress uniform

Marshal of the RAF command flag

Marshal of the RAF star plate

== Marshals of the Royal Air Force ==
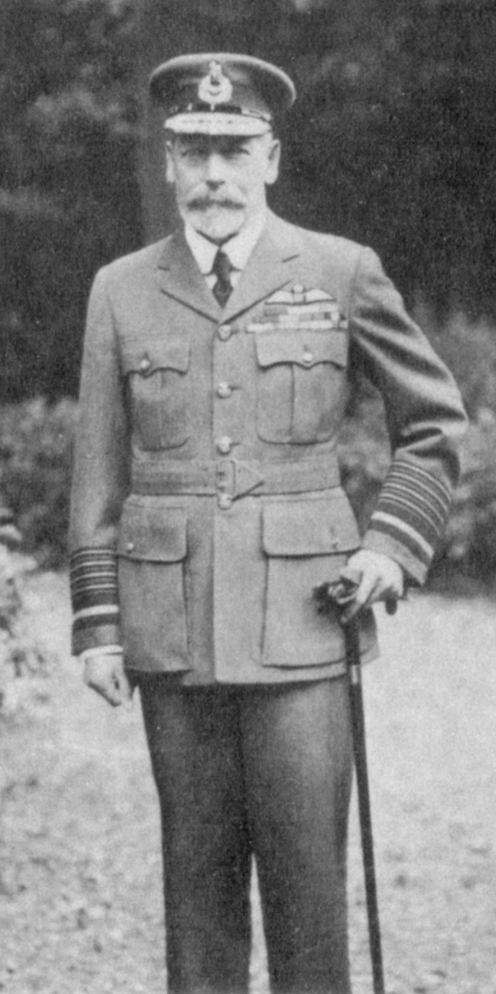
King George V in the uniform of a Marshal of the RAF (Ex officio)

Date of promotion	Image	Officer	Year of birth	Year of death	Notes
1 January 1927		Sir Hugh Trenchard (later Viscount Trenchard)	1873	1956	Chief of the Air Staff 1918 and 1919–1930
1 January 1933		Sir John Salmond	1881	1968	Chief of the Air Staff 1930–1933
21 January 1936		King Edward VIII	1894	1972	Assumed the rank on the date shown following accession to the throne.(Ex officio)
11 December 1936		King George VI	1895	1952	Assumed the rank on the date shown following accession to the throne.(Ex officio)
1 January 1937		Sir Edward Ellington	1877	1967	Chief of the Air Staff 1933–1937
4 October 1940		Sir Cyril Newall (later Lord Newall)	1886	1963	Chief of the Air Staff 1937–1940. Retired 20 days after promotion.
1 January 1944		Sir Charles Portal (later Viscount Portal of Hungerford)	1893	1971	Chief of the Air Staff 1940–1946
12 September 1945		Sir Arthur Tedder (later Lord Tedder)	1890	1967	Chief of the Air Staff 1946–1950
1 January 1946		Sir Sholto Douglas (later Lord Douglas of Kirtleside)	1893	1969	
1 January 1946		Sir Arthur "Bomber" Harris	1892	1984	Promoted several months after retirement.
8 June 1950		Sir John Slessor	1897	1979	Chief of the Air Staff 1950–1952
15 January 1953		Prince Philip, Duke of Edinburgh	1921	2021	Honorary appointment.
1 June 1954		Sir William Dickson	1898	1987	Chief of the Air Staff 1953–1955; Chief of the Defence Staff 1959
1 January 1958		Sir Dermot Boyle	1904	1993	Chief of the Air Staff 1956–1959
12 June 1958		The Duke of Gloucester	1900	1974	Honorary appointment.
6 April 1962		Sir Thomas Pike	1906	1983	Chief of the Air Staff 1960–1963
1 April 1967		Sir Charles Elworthy (later Lord Elworthy)	1911	1993	Chief of the Air Staff 1963–1967; Chief of the Defence Staff 1967–1971
1 April 1971		Sir John Grandy	1913	2004	Chief of the Air Staff 1967–1971; Promoted and retired on the same day.
31 March 1974		Sir Denis Spotswood	1916	2001	Chief of the Air Staff 1971–1974; Promoted and retired on the same day.
6 August 1976		Sir Andrew Humphrey	1921	1977	Chief of the Air Staff 1974–1976; Chief of the Defence Staff 1976–1977
31 July 1977		Sir Neil Cameron (later Lord Cameron of Balhousie)	1920	1985	Chief of the Air Staff 1976-1977; Chief of the Defence Staff 1977–1979
14 October 1982		Sir Michael Beetham	1923	2015	Chief of the Air Staff 1977–1982; Promoted and retired on the same day.
15 October 1985		Sir Keith Williamson	1928	2018	Chief of the Air Staff 1982–1985; Promoted and retired on the same day.
14 November 1988		Sir David Craig (later Lord Craig of Radley)	1929	Living	Chief of the Air Staff 1985–1988; Chief of the Defence Staff 1988–1991
6 November 1992		Sir Peter Harding	1933	2021	Chief of the Air Staff 1988–1992; Chief of the Defence Staff 1992–1994; Resigned commission 14 June 1994.
16 June 2012		King Charles III	1948	Living	Honorary appointment and at that time The Prince of Wales; Assumed the rank in full capacity on the day following accession to the throne. (Ex officio)
13 June 2014		Lord Stirrup	1949	Living	Chief of the Air Staff 2003–2006; Chief of the Defence Staff 2006–2010; Honorary rank.

Unlike other MRAFs who only relinquished their appointments, Sir Peter Harding resigned from the RAF in 1994. Consequently, his name was removed from the Air Force List, but it was later reinstated.

== See also ==
- Air force officer rank insignia
- British and U.S. military ranks compared
- Comparative military ranks
- General of the air force
- List of Royal Air Force air chief marshals
- Marshal of the air force
- RAF officer ranks
