= Chief of the Defence Staff (United Kingdom) =

Professional head of the British Armed Forces

- Flag of the CDS

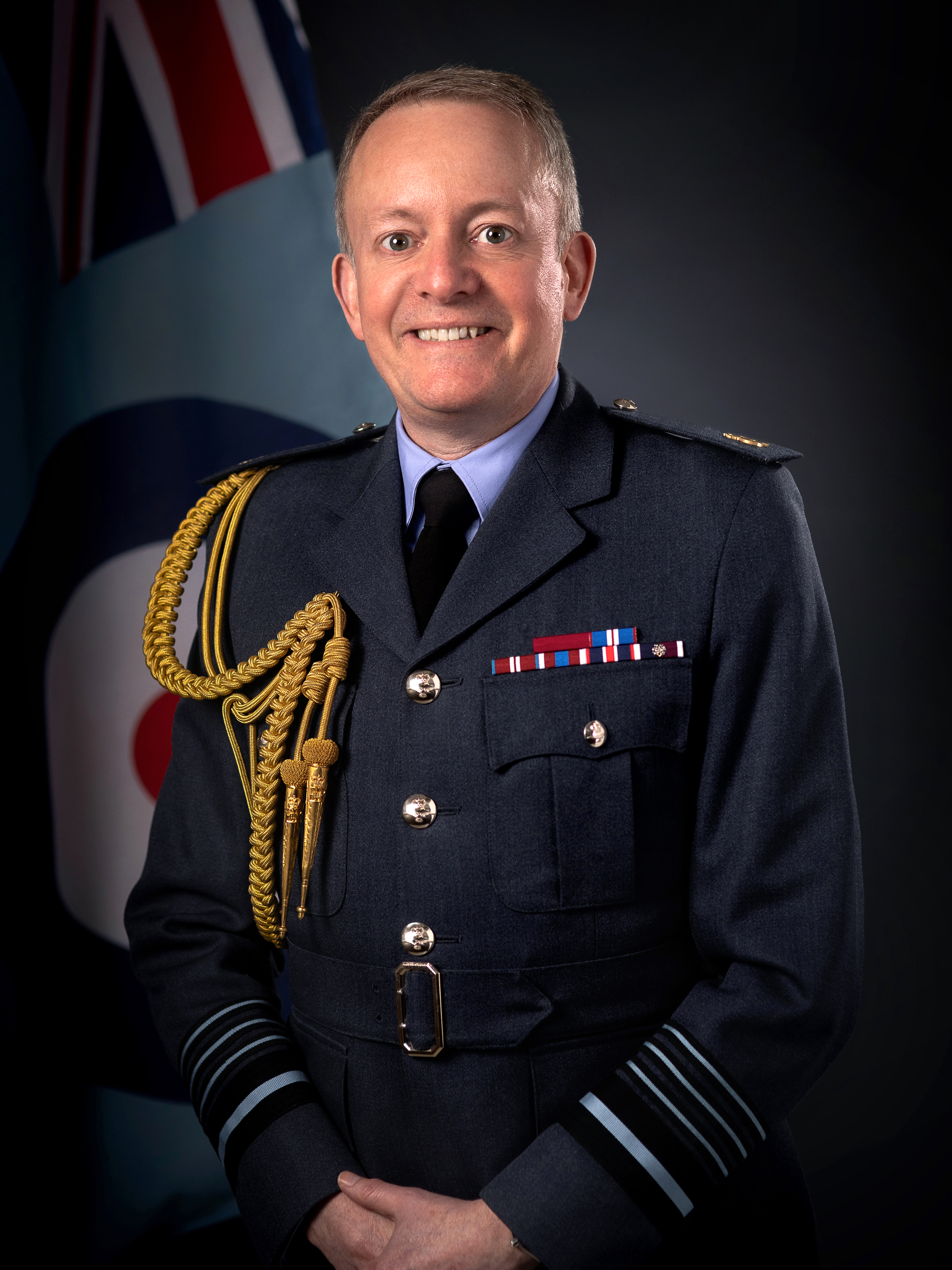
- Incumbent; Air Chief Marshal Sir Richard Knighton since 2 September 2025
- Ministry of Defence; British Armed Forces
- Abbreviation: CDS
- Member of: Defence Council; Chiefs of Staff Committee
- Reports to: The Prime Minister; Secretary of State for Defence
- Nominator: Secretary of State for Defence
- Appointer: The Monarch; on advice of the Prime Minister
- Term length: At His Majesty's pleasure
- Formation: 1 January 1959
- First holder: Marshal of the RAF Sir William Dickson
- Deputy: Vice-Chief of the Defence Staff
- Website: Official website

Chief of the Defence Staff (CDS) is the title of the professional head of the British Armed Forces and the most senior uniformed military adviser to the secretary of state for defence and the prime minister of the United Kingdom, and also meets regularly with the monarch. The CDS is based at the Ministry of Defence and works alongside the permanent under-secretary of state for defence, the ministry's senior civil servant. The CDS is the highest-ranking officer to currently serve in the armed forces.

Constitutionally, the sovereign is the de jure commander-in-chief of the armed forces. However, in practice, the Government of the United Kingdom exercises the royal prerogative de facto and provides direction of the armed forces through the Ministry of Defence's Defence Council, of which the CDS is a member.

The current CDS is Air Chief Marshal Sir Richard Knighton, who succeeded Admiral Sir Tony Radakin in September 2025. Chiefs of the defence staff are appointed on the recommendation of the secretary of state for defence to the prime minister, before being approved by the monarch.

== Responsibilities ==
The responsibilities of the CDS include:

- commanding the service chiefs (Note: Chief of the General Staff, Chief of the Air Staff, First Sea Lord and Chief of the Naval Staff, Commander Cyber & Specialist Operations Command) (through Military Strategic Headquarters)
- leading defence (with the Permanent Secretary (Perm Sec))
- setting strategy for defence, including the future development of the Armed Forces (subject to ministers’ direction, and together with Perm Sec)
- the conduct of current operations
- leading relationships with other countries’ Armed Forces

== Supporting and associated posts ==
The CDS is supported by a deputy, the Vice-Chief of the Defence Staff, who since 1997 (when the CDS post was downgraded) has been of equivalent rank but is ordinarily from a different service to the CDS.

There are also several Deputy Chief of the Defence Staff (DCDS) posts who support the VCDS. As of 2015, these are:

- Deputy Chief of Defence Staff (Military Strategy & Operations) (DCDS (MSO))
- Chief of Defence People (CDP)
- Deputy Chief of Defence Staff for Military Capability (DCDS (Mil Cap))

The CDS maintains a close working relationship with the Ministry of Defence's Permanent Under-Secretary, who is the Ministry's senior civil servant, and they both report directly to the Secretary of State for Defence. The CDS focuses on military operations and strategy, while the Permanent Under-Secretary's remit concerns administrative and financial policy.

Additionally, the CDS is supported by a Strategic Advisory Panel.

== History of the post ==
The post was created in 1959 to reflect the new concept of joint operations that had come to the fore in the Second World War. The first incumbent was Marshal of the RAF Sir William Dickson. Prior to the creation of the post, he had served as the chairman of the Chiefs of Staff Committee, from 1956 onwards. Before 1956, although no permanent post of chairman existed, the three service chiefs took it in turn to act as chairman at meetings. From the post's inception until the mid-to-late 1970s, CDS appointments were granted on a strict rotational basis between the three services. The first break in rotational order was precipitated by the death of Marshal of the RAF Sir Andrew Humphrey.

From the creation of the post until 1997, the Chief of the Defence Staff was appointed to the highest rank in the respective branch of the British armed forces to which he belonged, being an admiral of the Fleet, a field marshal or marshal of the Royal Air Force, (NATO rank grade OF-10). However, with the post-Cold War reduction in the manpower strength of the British Armed Forces and the additional reasoning that no new "Five-star" appointments are to be made in peacetime, since 1997 the Chief of the Defence Staff has kept the rank of admiral, general or air chief marshal, (NATO OF-9), which he invariably already holds. However, during the 2010s Charles Guthrie, Michael Boyce, Jock Stirrup and Michael Walker were honorarily promoted to their respective services' senior ranks, sometime after they had each stepped down as CDS. With the implementation of the Defence Reforms in April 2025, the CDS is also in charge of the Military Strategic Headquarters (MSHQ), commanding the four service chiefs and in charge of force design and equipment delivery to the armed forces. The CDS will also command the Deputy Chief of Defence Staff (Military Strategy & Operations) and the Deputy Chief of the Defence Staff (Force Development).

Professional heads of the English/British Armed Forces
	Royal Navy	British Army	Royal Air Force	Combined
1645	N/A	Commander-in-Chief of the Forces (1645/60–1904, intermittently)	Not established	
1689	Senior Naval Lord (1689–1771)	Commander-in-Chief of the Forces (1645/60–1904, intermittently)	Not established	
1771	First Naval Lord (1771–1904)	Commander-in-Chief of the Forces (1645/60–1904, intermittently)	Not established	
1904	First Sea Lord (1904–1917)	Chief of the General Staff (1904–1909)	Not established	Inter-service co-ordination was carried out from 1904 by the Committee of Imperial Defence under the chairmanship of the Prime Minister
1909	First Sea Lord (1904–1917)	Chief of the Imperial General Staff (1909–1964)	Not established	Inter-service co-ordination was carried out from 1904 by the Committee of Imperial Defence under the chairmanship of the Prime Minister
1917	First Sea Lord and Chief of the Naval Staff (1917–present)	Chief of the Imperial General Staff (1909–1964)	Not established	Inter-service co-ordination was carried out from 1904 by the Committee of Imperial Defence under the chairmanship of the Prime Minister
1918	First Sea Lord and Chief of the Naval Staff (1917–present)	Chief of the Imperial General Staff (1909–1964)	Chief of the Air Staff (1918–present)	Inter-service co-ordination was carried out from 1904 by the Committee of Imperial Defence under the chairmanship of the Prime Minister
1923	First Sea Lord and Chief of the Naval Staff (1917–present)	Chief of the Imperial General Staff (1909–1964)	Chief of the Air Staff (1918–present)	Chairman of the Chiefs of Staff Committee (1923–1959, held by one of the service heads until 1956)
1959	First Sea Lord and Chief of the Naval Staff (1917–present)	Chief of the Imperial General Staff (1909–1964)	Chief of the Air Staff (1918–present)	Chief of the Defence Staff (1959–present)
1964	First Sea Lord and Chief of the Naval Staff (1917–present)	Chief of the General Staff (1964–present)	Chief of the Air Staff (1918–present)	Chief of the Defence Staff (1959–present)

== List of Chiefs of the Defence Staff (1959–present) ==
No.	Picture	Chief of the Defence Staff	Took office	Left office	Time in office	Defence branch	Life peerage	Ref.
1	Sir William Dickson	Marshal of the Royal Air Force; Sir William Dickson (1898–1987); Previously served as the Chief of the Air Staff	1 January 1959	12 July 1959	192 days	Royal Air Force	None	
2	Louis Mountbatten, 1st Earl Mountbatten of Burma	Admiral of the Fleet; Louis Mountbatten, 1st Earl Mountbatten of Burma (1900–1979); Previously served as the First Sea Lord and Chief of the Naval Staff	13 July 1959	15 July 1965	6 years, 2 days	Royal Navy	Hereditary peerage, Earl Mountbatten of Burma	
3	Sir Richard Hull	Field Marshal; Sir Richard Hull (1907–1989); Previously served as the Chief of the General Staff	16 July 1965	4 August 1967	2 years, 19 days	British Army	None	
4	Sir Charles Elworthy	Marshal of the Royal Air Force; Sir Charles Elworthy (1911–1993); Previously served as the Chief of the Air Staff	4 August 1967	8 April 1971	3 years, 247 days	Royal Air Force	Baron Elworthy	
5	Sir Peter Hill-Norton	Admiral of the Fleet; Sir Peter Hill-Norton (1915–2004); Previously served as the First Sea Lord and Chief of the Naval Staff	9 April 1971	21 October 1973	2 years, 195 days	Royal Navy	Baron Hill-Norton	
6	Sir Michael Carver	Field Marshal; Sir Michael Carver (1915–2001); Previously served as the Chief of the General Staff	21 October 1973	24 October 1976	3 years, 3 days	British Army	Baron Carver	
7	Sir Andrew Humphrey	Marshal of the Royal Air Force; Sir Andrew Humphrey (1921–1977); Previously served as the Chief of the Air Staff	24 October 1976	24 January 1977 †	92 days	Royal Air Force	None	
—	Sir Edward Ashmore	Admiral of the Fleet; Sir Edward Ashmore (1919–2016); Acting; Previously served as the First Sea Lord and Chief of the Naval Staff	9 February 1977	30 August 1977	202 days	Royal Navy	None	
8	Sir Neil Cameron	Marshal of the Royal Air Force; Sir Neil Cameron (1920–1985); Previously served as the Chief of the Air Staff	31 August 1977	31 August 1979	2 years	Royal Air Force	Baron Cameron of Balhousie	
9	Sir Terence Lewin	Admiral of the Fleet; Sir Terence Lewin (1920–1999); Previously served as the First Sea Lord and Chief of the Naval Staff	1 September 1979	30 September 1982	3 years, 29 days	Royal Navy	Baron Lewin	
10	Sir Edwin Bramall	Field Marshal; Sir Edwin Bramall (1923–2019); Previously served as the Chief of the General Staff (Note: Previously served as the Vice-Chief of the Defence Staff.)	1 October 1982	31 October 1985	3 years, 30 days	British Army	Baron Bramall	
11	Sir John Fieldhouse	Admiral of the Fleet; Sir John Fieldhouse (1928–1992); Previously served as the First Sea Lord and Chief of the Naval Staff	1 November 1985	9 December 1988	3 years, 38 days	Royal Navy	Baron Fieldhouse	
12	Sir David Craig	Marshal of the Royal Air Force; Sir David Craig (born 1929); Previously served as the Chief of the Air Staff	9 December 1988	1 April 1991	2 years, 113 days	Royal Air Force	Baron Craig of Radley	
13	Sir Richard Vincent	Field Marshal; Sir Richard Vincent (1931–2018)	2 April 1991	31 December 1992	1 year, 273 days	British Army	Baron Vincent of Coleshill	
14	Sir Peter Harding	Marshal of the Royal Air Force; Sir Peter Harding (1933–2021); Previously served as the Chief of the Air Staff	31 December 1992	13 March 1994	1 year, 72 days	Royal Air Force	None	
15	Sir Peter Inge	Field Marshal; Sir Peter Inge (1935–2022); Previously served as the Chief of the General Staff	15 March 1994	1 April 1997	3 years, 17 days	British Army	Baron Inge	
16	Sir Charles Guthrie	General; Sir Charles Guthrie (1938–2025); Previously served as the Chief of the General Staff	2 April 1997	15 February 2001	3 years, 319 days	British Army	Baron Guthrie of Craigiebank	
17	Sir Michael Boyce	Admiral; Sir Michael Boyce (1943–2022); Previously served as the First Sea Lord and Chief of the Naval Staff	16 February 2001	2 May 2003	2 years, 75 days	Royal Navy	Baron Boyce	
18	Sir Michael Walker	General; Sir Michael Walker (born 1944); Previously served as the Chief of the General Staff	2 May 2003	28 April 2006	2 years, 361 days	British Army	Baron Walker of Aldringham	
19	Sir Graham "Jock" Stirrup	Air Chief Marshal; Sir Graham "Jock" Stirrup (born 1949); Previously served as the Chief of the Air Staff	28 April 2006	29 October 2010	4 years, 184 days	Royal Air Force	Baron Stirrup	
20	Sir David Richards	General; Sir David Richards (born 1952); Previously served as the Chief of the General Staff	29 October 2010	18 July 2013	2 years, 271 days	British Army	Baron Richards of Herstmonceux	
21	Sir Nicholas Houghton	General; Sir Nicholas Houghton (born 1954); Previously served as the Vice-Chief of the Defence Staff	18 July 2013	14 July 2016	2 years, 362 days	British Army	Baron Houghton of Richmond	
22	Sir Stuart Peach	Air Chief Marshal; Sir Stuart Peach (born 1956); Previously served as the Vice-Chief of the Defence Staff	14 July 2016	11 June 2018	1 year, 332 days	Royal Air Force	Baron Peach	
23	Sir Nicholas Carter	General; Sir Nicholas Carter (born 1959); Previously served as the Chief of the General Staff	11 June 2018	30 November 2021	3 years, 172 days	British Army	None	
24	Sir Tony Radakin	Admiral; Sir Tony Radakin (born 1965); Previously served as the First Sea Lord and Chief of the Naval Staff	30 November 2021	2 September 2025	3 years, 276 days	Royal Navy	None	
25	Sir Richard Knighton	Air Chief Marshal; Sir Richard Knighton (born 1969); Previously served as the Chief of the Air Staff	2 September 2025	Incumbent	1 year, 49 days	Royal Air Force	Incumbent	

== Peerage ==
Customarily, former Chiefs of Defence Staff receive a life peerage on retirement, (Note: Sir William Dickson, Sir Richard Hull and Sir Peter Harding never received a peerage.) sitting in the House of Lords as non-political crossbench peers. Their appointment is recommended not via the House of Lords Appointments Commission as is normal procedure, but is instead nominated directly to the monarch by the prime minister, who elects to nominate "a limited number of distinguished public servants" on retirement for a peerage. Sir Jock Stirrup was introduced to the House of Lords on 1 February 2010 as Baron Stirrup, of Marylebone in the City of Westminster.

== See also ==
- Head of the British Armed Forces

== Sources ==
- Carver, Michael (1989). Out of Step: The Memoirs of Field Marshal Lord Carver. London: Hutchinson. ISBN 0-09173-985-3.
- Heathcote, Tony (2002). The British Admirals of the Fleet 1734–1995. Havertown: Pen & Sword. ISBN 0-85052-835-6.
- Richards, David (2014). Taking Command. London: Headline. ISBN 1-47222-084-6.
