= Andrew Humphrey =

Marshal of the Royal Air Force (1921–1977)

Marshal of the Royal Air Force Sir Andrew Humphrey GCB OBE DFC AFC & Two Bars
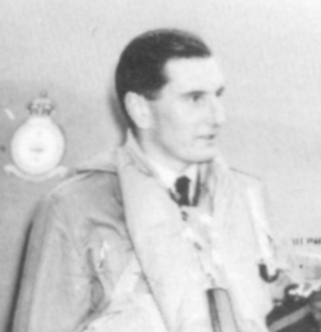
- Humphrey after his 1953 record-breaking flight from Cape Town to London.
- Born: 10 January 1921; Edinburgh, Scotland
- Died: 24 January 1977 (aged 56); RAF Halton, Buckinghamshire, England
- Military career
- Allegiance: United Kingdom
- Branch: Royal Air Force
- Service years: 1939–1977
- Rank: Marshal of the Royal Air Force
- Commands: Chief of the Defence Staff (1976–77); Chief of the Air Staff (1974–76); RAF Strike Command (1971–74); Air Member for Personnel (1968–71); Air Forces Middle East (1965–67); RAF Akrotiri (1959–62)
- Conflicts: Second World War; Aden Emergency
- Awards: Knight Grand Cross of the Order of the Bath; Officer of the Order of the British Empire; Distinguished Flying Cross; Air Force Cross & Two Bars; Mentioned in Despatches

Marshal of the Royal Air Force Sir Andrew Henry Humphrey, GCB, OBE, DFC, AFC & Two Bars (10 January 1921 – 24 January 1977) was a senior officer in the Royal Air Force. He fought in the Second World War as a fighter pilot taking part in the Battle of Britain and also took part in the withdrawal from Aden in November 1967. He served as the Chief of the Air Staff advising the new Labour Government on the implementation of their latest Defence Review. He then served as Chief of the Defence Staff but caught pneumonia within three months of taking office and died shortly afterwards.

== Early life ==
The son of John Humphrey CBE and his wife, Agnes Florence Humphrey (née Beatson-Bell), Humphrey was born on 10 January 1921 in the Scottish capital, Edinburgh. He was educated at Belhaven Hill School in Dunbar and Bradfield College.

== RAF career ==
Humphrey joined the Royal Air Force College Cranwell in January 1939 and was granted a permanent commission as a pilot officer on 30 April 1940. Following flying training he was posted as a pilot to No. 266 Squadron at RAF Wittering in September 1940 and found himself flying Spitfires in the Battle of Britain. In March 1941 he was involved in an incident when his engine failed and his Spitfire crashed in flames, but he survived. He was promoted to the war substantive rank of flying officer on 1 May 1941. On a single night in May 1941, he shot down one bomber and two other enemy aircraft near the Dutch coast: he was awarded the Distinguished Flying Cross for this on 30 May 1941.

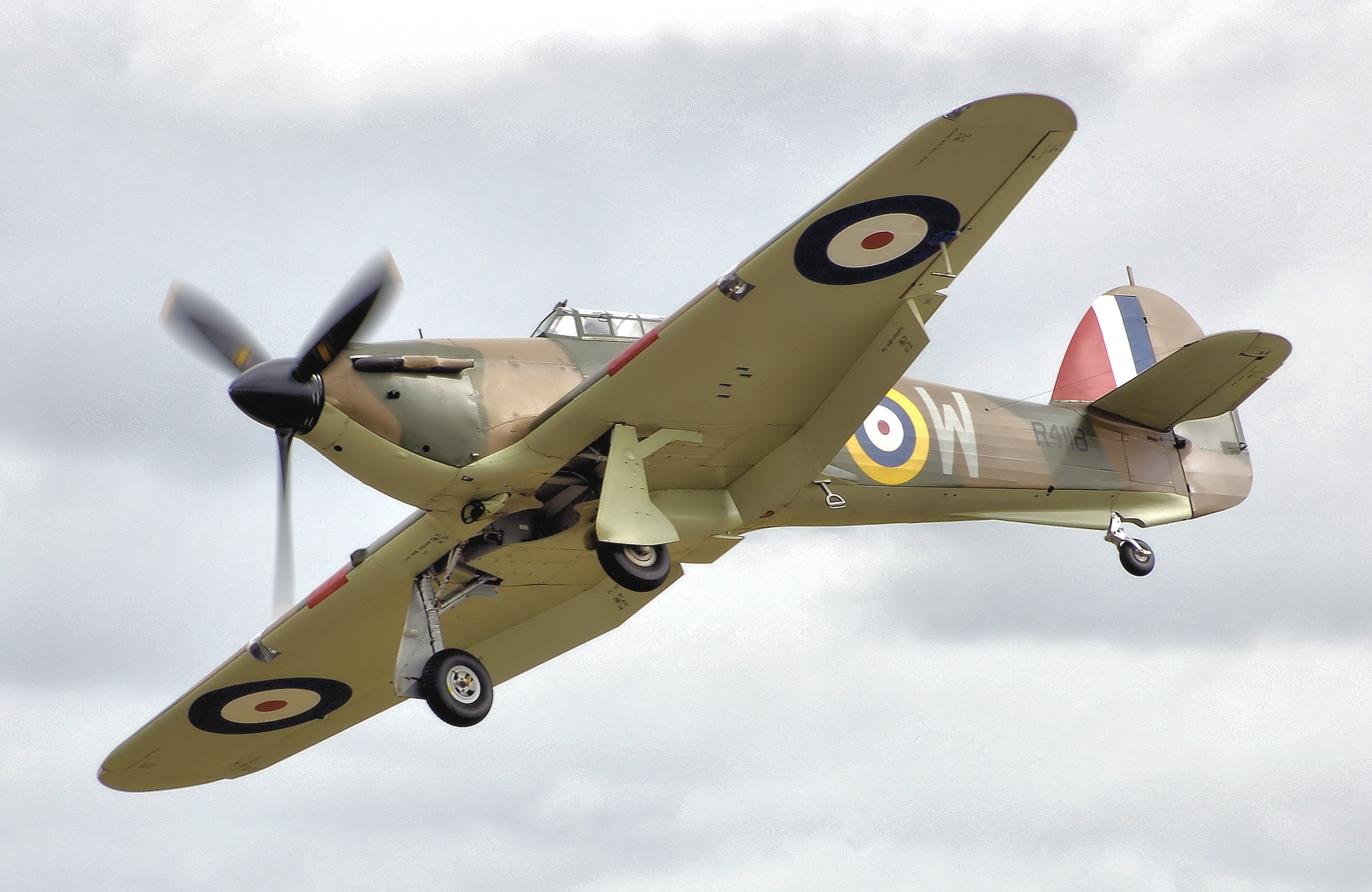
Hawker Hurricane, a type flown by Humphrey during the Second World War

Humphrey transferred to No. 452 Squadron, flying Spitfires from RAF Kenley in July 1941, before becoming an instructor at No. 58 Operational Training Unit at RAF Grangemouth in August 1941. He became a Flight Commander with No. 175 Squadron flying Hurricanes from RAF Warmwell in March 1942 and was promoted to the war substantive rank of flight lieutenant on 1 May 1942 before returning to RAF Grangemouth in July 1942. Awarded the Air Force Cross on 1 January 1943, he attended the Low Attack Instructor's School at RAF Milfield in early 1943. He became a Flight Commander with No. 6 Squadron, flying Hurricanes in North Africa in July 1943, and was promoted to flight lieutenant on a permanent basis on 7 September 1943. He became an instructor at No. 5 Middle East Training School at RAF Shallufa in Egypt in January 1944 before being posted to the staff at RAF Nicosia in Cyprus in June 1944 and then to the staff at RAF Ranchi in India in November 1944. He was awarded a Bar to the Air Force Cross on 1 January 1945, and promoted to the war substantive rank of squadron leader on 20 February 1945.

At the end of the War, Humphrey joined the Air Staff at Headquarters British Air Forces South East Asia, before transferring to the Air Staff at Headquarters No. 106 Group at RAF Benson, where he learnt the art of photographic reconnaissance, in August 1946. He was confirmed in the rank of squadron leader on a permanent basis on 1 August 1947. He became a Flight Commander with No. 82 Squadron flying Lancasters and Dakotas in an aerial mapping role in Africa in September 1948 and went on to be an instructor at the RAF Flying College at Manby in May 1951. Having been appointed an Officer of the Order of the British Empire in the 1951 New Year Honours and promoted to wing commander on 1 July 1951, he became a senior instructor there in February 1953. In December 1953, Humphrey piloted "Aries IV", a Canberra B.2, from Cape Town to London in a then record 13 hours 16 minutes and 25 seconds.

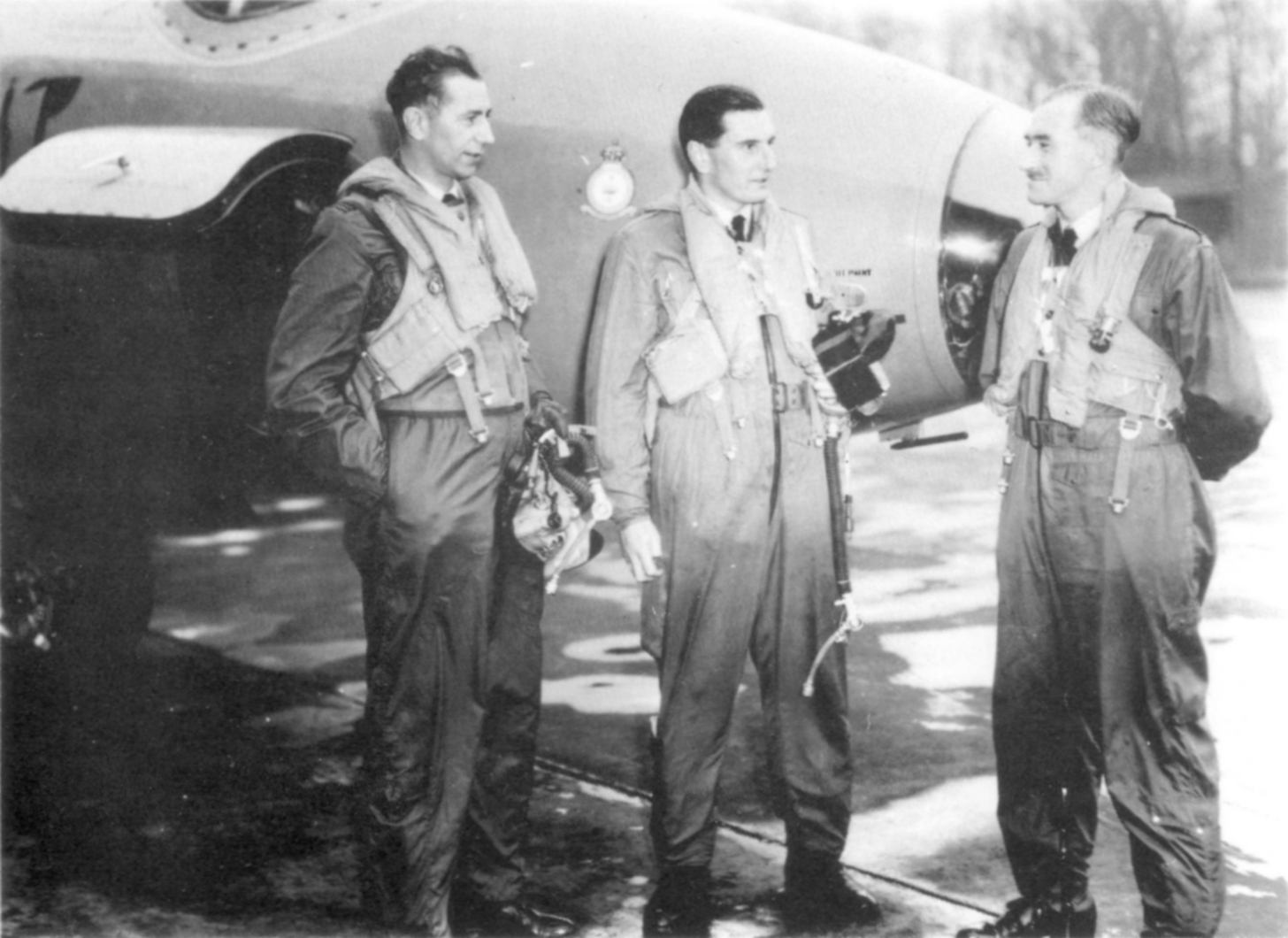
Humphrey (centre) with his two navigators after the flight from Cape Town to London

Humphrey attended RAF Staff College in 1955 and was awarded a second Bar to his Air Force Cross in the 1955 Birthday Honours. He was posted to the Directorate of Operational Requirements at the Air Ministry in February 1956 where he was elevated to deputy director before being promoted to group captain on 1 July 1957 and appointed a Companion of the Order of the Bath in the 1959 Birthday Honours.

Humphrey became Officer Commanding RAF Akrotiri in February 1959 and then attended the Imperial Defence College in 1962 before being promoted to air commodore on 1 July 1962. He became Director of Joint Plans at the Air Ministry in November 1962 and then Director of Defence Plans (Air) at the Ministry of Defence in April 1964 Promoted to air vice marshal on 1 January 1965, he became Air Officer Commanding Air Forces Middle East on 15 December 1965 and, following the withdrawal from Aden in November 1967, he was mentioned in despatches for his services in operations there on 23 January 1968. He went on to be Air Member for Personnel with the acting rank of air marshal on 18 March 1968 and advanced to Knight Commander of the Order of the Bath in the 1968 Birthday Honours.

Having been promoted to the substantive rank of air marshal on 1 January 1969, and to air chief marshal on 1 December 1970, Humphrey became Commander-in-Chief RAF Strike Command on 5 January 1971. He was advanced to Knight Grand Cross of the Order of the Bath in the 1974 New Year Honours.

Humphrey was appointed Air Aide-de-Camp to the Queen on 31 March 1974 and Chief of the Air Staff on 1 April 1974. As Chief of the Air Staff he advised the new Labour Government on the implementation of their latest Defence Review. This included his recommendations to concentrate on front line forces and reduce expenditure on research and future-related services. This resulted in the closure of the Bedford research establishment, the closure of the Institute of Aviation Medicine (IAM) and other research areas at Farnborough. Most of these research facilities were later re-instated (The IAM re-formed at RAF Cranwell) but Bedford remained closed and Farnborough with reduced facilities.

Following promotion to Marshal of the Royal Air Force on 6 August 1976, Humphrey was appointed Chief of the Defence Staff on 24 October 1976. However he only served in that role for three months before catching pneumonia following a visit to British forces in Norway during a particularly cold Winter. He died in the RAF Hospital at Halton on 24 January 1977.

== Personal life ==
In March 1952 Humphrey married Agnes Stevenson Wright; there were no children. In 1978 his widow, Lady Humphrey, visited RAF Gütersloh in the then West Germany to open the newly built Andrew Humphrey School in the village of Blankenhagen, a primary school for the children of RAF personnel.

== Sources ==
- Probert, Henry (1991). High Commanders of the Royal Air Force. HMSO. ISBN 0-11-772635-4.

Military offices
Preceded by Johnnie Johnson	Air Officer Commanding Air Forces Middle East; 1965–1967	Absorbed into Air Forces Gulf
Preceded by Sir David Lee	Air Member for Personnel; 1968–1970	Succeeded by Sir Lewis Hodges
Preceded by Sir Denis Spotswood	Commander-in-Chief RAF Strike Command; 1971–1974	Succeeded by Sir Denis Smallwood
Preceded by Sir Denis Spotswood	Chief of the Air Staff; 1974–1976	Succeeded by Sir Neil Cameron
Preceded by Sir Michael Carver	Chief of the Defence Staff; 1976–1977	Succeeded by Sir Edward Ashmore
