= Charles Steele (RAF officer) =

Royal Air Force Air Marshal (1897–1973)

Sir Charles Ronald Steele
- Born: 9 November 1897; Netheredge, West Riding of Yorkshire
- Died: 14 February 1973 (aged 75); Trumpington, Cambridgeshire
- Military career
- Allegiance: United Kingdom
- Branch: British Army (1916–1918); Royal Air Force (1918–1952)
- Service years: 1916–1952
- Rank: Air Marshal
- Commands: Coastal Command (1950–1952); AHQ Malta (1947–1949); No. 85 Group (1944–1945); No. 10 Group (1943–1944); No. 9 Group (1942); No. 18 Squadron (1936–1937)
- Conflicts: First World War; Second World War
- Awards: Knight Commander of the Order of the Bath; Distinguished Flying Cross; Mentioned in Despatches; Commander of the Royal Order of George I with Swords (Greece); Commander of the Legion of Honour (France); Croix de guerre (France); Commander of the Order of the Crown (Belgium); Croix de guerre (Belgium)

Air Marshal Sir Charles Ronald Steele, KCB, DFC, DL (9 November 1897 – 14 February 1973) was a Royal Air Force officer who became Air Officer Commanding-in-Chief at Coastal Command from 1950 to 1952.

== RAF career ==
Educated at Oundle School and the Royal Military College, Sandhurst, Steele was commissioned into the Green Howards in 1916. He transferred into the Royal Flying Corps and became a flying ace credited with seven aerial victories. He transferred into the Royal Air Force after the First World War and was granted a permanent commission on 1 August 1919. He was appointed Officer Commanding No. 18 Squadron in 1936 and served in the Second World War, initially on the Air Staff at Headquarters No. 3 Group, and then at the Rhodesian Air Training Group before being appointed Senior Air Staff Officer and then temporary Air Officer Commanding at No. 9 Group. He went on to be Air Officer Commanding No. 10 Group and then Air Officer Commanding No. 85 Group. He was made Senior Air Staff Officer at the Headquarters of the British Air Forces of Occupation in Germany in July 1945. He became Air Officer Commanding AHQ Malta in 1947 and Air Officer Commanding-in-Chief at Coastal Command in 1950 before retiring in 1952.

Military offices
Preceded by Sir John Baker	Air Officer Commanding-in-Chief Coastal Command; 1950–1952	Succeeded by Sir Alick Stevens
