= Ramsey St Mary's =

Village in Cambridgeshire, England

Coordinates: 52.4759°N 0.1521°W

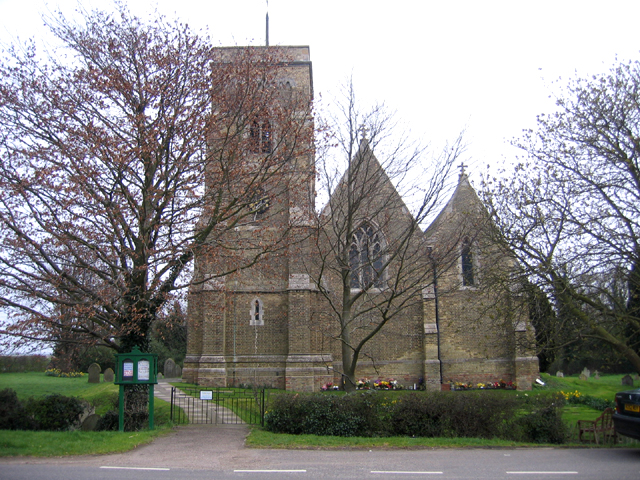
- St Mary's Parish Church, Ramsey

- Location within Cambridgeshire
- OS grid reference: TL2588
- District: Huntingdonshire
- Shire county: Cambridgeshire
- Region: East
- Country: England
- Sovereign state: United Kingdom
- Post town: Huntingdon
- Postcode district: PE26
- Dialling code: 01733
- Police: Cambridgeshire
- Fire: Cambridgeshire
- Ambulance: East of England
- UK Parliament: North West Cambridgeshire

Ramsey St Mary's is a village in Ramsey civil parish, part of the Huntingdonshire district of Cambridgeshire, England. It is the largest parish in Huntingdonshire. The parish comprises 16,969 acres of land.

== Church ==
During the 1850s, the need for a church in Ramsey St Mary's was realised, due to an increase in the population of Ramsey which was outgrowing the capacity of the parish church of St Thomas à Becket. This increase was in part due to a large number of settlers, who had moved onto reclaimed land when Whittlesey Mere, Trundle and Ugg Meres were drained. Also, houses existed which were at least four miles from any church. The church was founded in 1858 by Mrs Emma Fellowes, widow of William Henry Fellowes of Ramsey Abbey, Cambridgeshire, and was opened in 1859. The parish of Ramsey St Mary was created on 3 July 1860, and in 1861 had a population of 1,088, increasing only slightly as the century progressed. In addition to the church, a large vicarage was built on its East side, and a school and school house were built on the West side. The Vicarage was demolished after suffering subsidence. The school house and school are still standing, being used as a private dwelling and a garage. All of these buildings were constructed using buff-coloured local brick.

The building is an elegant Victorian church, built in the Early Decorated/Gothic style, with yellow brick and facings of stone. It stands on a vaulted foundation supported by a large number of long bog oak piles, which were driven through peat and soft clay down to a level of hard clay by pile driver, the weight for which was left in the corner of the churchyard for many years. The architect was Richard Armstrong of London and the builder John Bird of Huntingdon. The building consists of a tower, nave and chancel. The tower was originally surmounted by a wooden and slated broach-spire complete with a weathercock. Over the years the spire became unsafe, and was removed about 1920, leaving battlements which were themselves removed from the tower in 1974. The tower contains a clock with two faces, one to the north and one to the west, and also two bells, one weighing 4 cwt. 2 qrs. 7 lbs. and the other 4 cwt. 14 lbs., each inscribed "G. Mears Founder London 1858", supplied by Chas. and Geo. Mears of 267 Whitechapel Road, London.

The nave has five bays, the one on the north-west corner being taken up by the tower. All the wall pieces are supported on well carved stone corbels, which have alternate male and female heads. There are sixty-one of them, mainly depicting kings and queens of England. In the centre of the rear of the nave is the font, which has panels carved alternately with foliage and scenes, the latter being the Nativity, Baptism, Crucifixion and Ascension of our Lord.

The chancel has one step from the nave up to it and two more to the sanctuary. Originally the ten commandments and creed on the east wall were decorated with ornamental patterns, these have now been limewashed over. The Chancel windows are more enriched than those in the aisles, all have stained glass. The chancel arch is supported on large corbels, representing angels playing musical instruments, their wings extending backwards and embracing the wall although these have been badly damaged by the damp.

St Mary's Church, Ramsey St Mary's, is part of the United Benefice of the Ramseys and Upwood with the current incumbent the Reverend Iain Osborne.

The churchyard is still in use and has been extended on three occasions. A walk around reveals the last resting places of William Caldwell Harpur, "Vicar of this parish 1875-1912", and Charles Brown, "for 12 years Vicar of Ramsey St Mary". The names of some of the men who died during World War One are mentioned on the gravestones of their parents, and there are six Commonwealth War Grave Commission headstones here. There must be sad tales to tell about the Emmington, Phillips and Pledger families who lost 3, 6 and 3 children respectively. However, there are almost twenty instances where the persons were aged ninety years or more at the time of their deaths.

Between 1997 and 2000 renovations were carried out on the building and surroundings. The work was funded by the villagers of Ramsey St Mary's and Ramsey Heights, with grants from the Heritage Lottery Fund, the Millennium Commission, and others. A summary of the work was as follows:

- Main roof retiled using original tiles where appropriate;
- Tower repointed and bell-frame strengthened;
- New path designed and laid;
- Mixed hedge planted, and post and rail fence erected, with a gate for vehicular access;
- Interior of the building completely redecorated;
- A meeting room containing toilet and kitchen facilities constructed;
- All interior roof and floor timber treated with preservative;
- Level of land on north side raised to counteract settlement.

The soil, its transport, and required labour were all donated by local farmers.

== Railway station ==
St Mary's railway station served the village between 1863 and 1947 on the Ramsey branch line running from the main Great Northern Railway at Holme railway station through to Ramsey North railway station
