= Abbots Ripton railway station =

Former railway station in Cambridgeshire, England

Coordinates: 52°23′35″N 0°12′20″W

Abbots Ripton
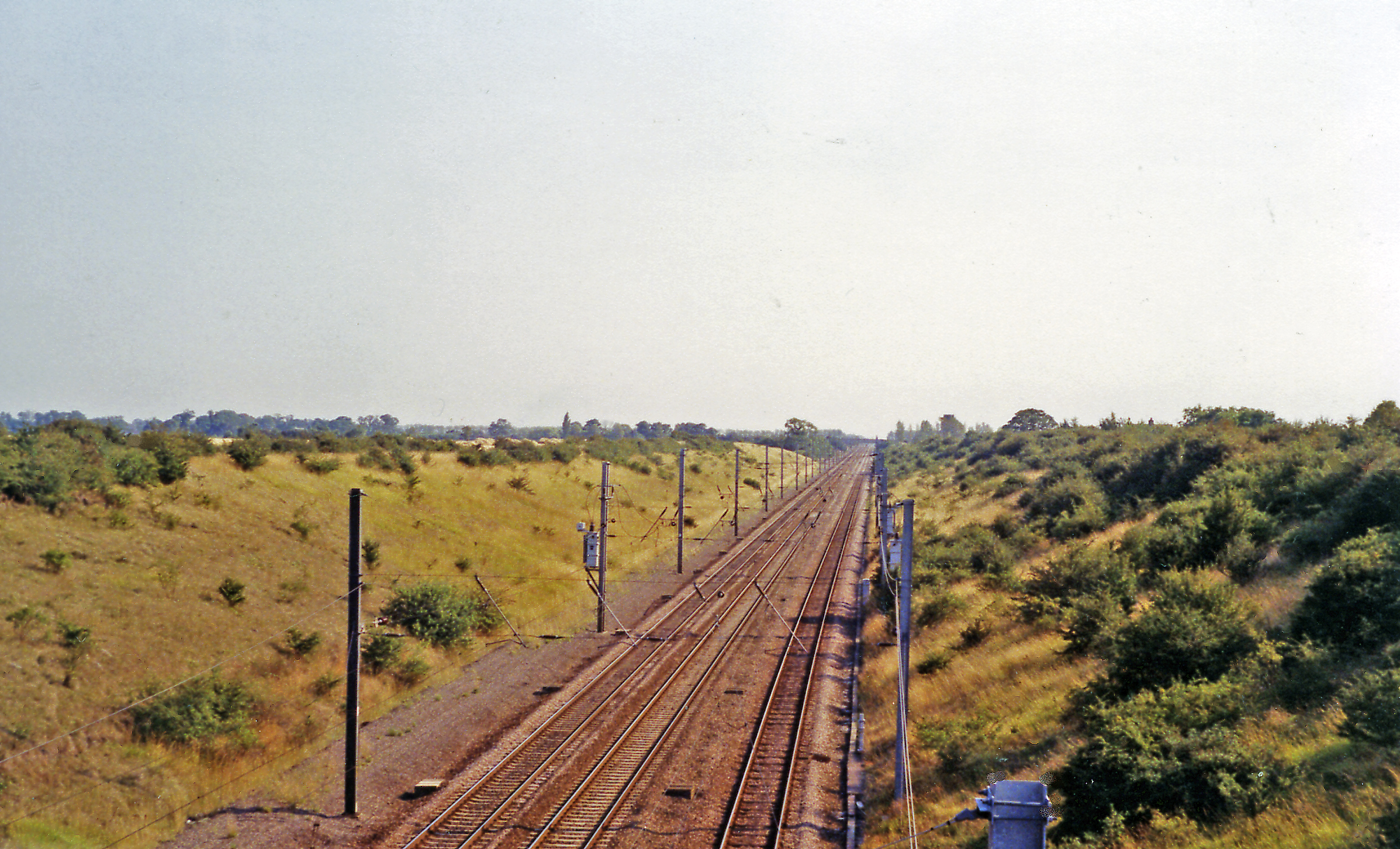
- Abbots Ripton station site, 1991

General information
- Location: Abbots Ripton, Huntingdonshire; England
- Grid reference: TL222788
- Platforms: 2
- Tracks: 4

Other information
- Status: Disused

History
- Opened: 1 November 1885 (as Abbotts Ripton)
- Original company: Great Northern Railway
- Pre-grouping: Great Northern Railway
- Post-grouping: London and North Eastern Railway

Key dates
- 21 January 1876: Abbots Ripton rail disaster
- 1938: Renamed Abbots Ripton
- 15 September 1958: Closed for passengers
- 5 October 1964: Closed for goods
Location

Abbots Ripton railway station was a railway station on the East Coast Main Line in the English county of Cambridgeshire. Although trains on the now-electrified railway still pass the site, the station closed in 1958. Due to the position of the station in a cutting, it had two platforms which were staggered. They served the fast lines only, and a goods line ran around the back of each platform.

== History ==
The station was opened by the Great Northern Railway (GNR) on 1 November 1885 as Abbotts Ripton. The GNR became part of the London and North Eastern Railway (LNER) as part of the Grouping on 1 January 1923. Renamed Abbots Ripton in 1938, the station passed on to the Eastern Region of British Railways following nationalisation in 1948, and was closed by the British Transport Commission on 15 September 1958. Despite the name change in 1938, the signal box nameboards and the lamp casings continued to display the former name throughout the station's existence

== Abbots Ripton rail disaster ==
On 21 January 1876, an accident occurred at the future site of the station when the southbound Flying Scotsman express train from Edinburgh to London was involved in a double collision during a blizzard. Heavy snow had frozen the semaphore signal arms into their slots in the signal post, causing them to incorrectly indicate "all clear". As a result, the driver of the express was not warned of the presence of a coal train which was backing from the main line into a siding. A collision occurred and, not long after, a northbound express from London to Leeds ran into the wreckage. There were thirteen fatalities, and 53 passengers and six train crew were injured.

== Routes ==
Preceding station	Historical railways	Following station
Huntingdon North; Line and station open	Great Northern Railway; East Coast Main Line	Holme; Line open, station closed
