= St Mary's railway station (England) =

Former railway station in Cambridgeshire, England

Coordinates: 52.4673°N 0.1548°W

St. Mary's

General information
- Location: Ramsey St Mary's, Huntingdonshire; England
- Grid reference: TL254871
- Platforms: 1

Other information
- Status: Disused

History
- Original company: Ramsey Railway
- Pre-grouping: Great Northern and Great Eastern Joint Railway
- Post-grouping: London and North Eastern Railway

Key dates
- 22 Jul 1863: Opened
- 6 Oct 1947: Closed for passengers
- 1971: closed for freight
Location

St. Mary's railway station was the intermediate railway station in Ramsey St Mary's, Cambridgeshire on the Great Northern railway line running from Holme to Ramsey North. The former station is now demolished and a bungalow stands in its place. It closed to passengers on 6 October 1947, and became an unstaffed siding from May 1960, with freight use until around 1971.

== Route ==
Preceding station	Disused railways	Following station
Holme	Great Northern Railway; Ramsey branch	Ramsey North
