= Abbots Ripton rail accident =

1876 Multi-train collision in Huntingdonshire, England

Coordinates: 52.3873°N 0.20202°W

- The railway accident at Abbots Ripton: Working parties removing the injured (The Illustrated London News, 29 January 1876)

Details
- Date: 21 January 1876
- Location: Abbots Ripton
- Country: United Kingdom
- Line: East Coast Main Line
- Operator: Great Northern Railway
- Incident type: Double collision
- Cause: Wrong-side failure (multiple)

Statistics
- Trains: 3
- Deaths: 13
- Injured: 59 (53 passengers and 6 crew members)

The Abbots Ripton rail disaster occurred on 21 January 1876 at Abbots Ripton, then in the county of Huntingdonshire, England, on the Great Northern Railway main line, previously thought to be exemplary for railway safety. In the accident, the Special Scotch Express train from Edinburgh to London was involved in a collision, during a blizzard, with a coal train. An express travelling in the other direction then ran into the wreckage. The initial accident was caused by:

- over-reliance on signals and block working as allowing high-speed running even in adverse conditions
- systematic signal failure in the adverse conditions of that day due to a vulnerability to accumulation of snow and ice

The accident (and the subsequent inquiry into it) led to fundamental changes in British railway signalling practice.

== Overview ==
A coal train preceding the Flying Scotsman on the main East Coast up (south-bound) line was normally scheduled to be shunted into a siding at Abbots Ripton to allow the much faster Scotsman to pass. Because of a very bad snowstorm, both the coal train and the Flying Scotsman were running late and the signalman at Holme, the next station north of Abbots Ripton, judged that the coal train needed to go into sidings at Holme if it was not to delay the Flying Scotsman. He therefore set his signal levers to danger so as to stop the coal train, but it continued on the main line until it reached Abbots Ripton, where as expected the signalman waved it on to his box with a hand lamp, and directed it to shunt. The goods train had nearly completed shunting into the Abbots Ripton siding when the Scotch express ran into it at speed. The wreckage obstructed the down (northbound) line and a second collision occurred some minutes later when a northbound express to Leeds crashed into the wreckage. Thirteen passengers died in the collisions, and 53 passengers and 6 traincrew members were injured. Among the deaths was Dion William Boucicault, the eldest son of the prominent Irish-born actor-playwright Dion Boucicault.

The Great Northern was operating on the block system, which was supposed to eliminate such accidents, so the accident caused considerable alarm. It was soon established that the main problem was with signals and snow:

- the weight of snow on the semaphore arm and/or snow and ice on the wires by which the arm should be moved had meant that when signalmen had put levers to the 'danger' position from the normal 'all clear' the signals did not fully move to 'danger'
- in normal conditions, signalmen could see the signals they were controlling – in a snowstorm they could not

The coal train had therefore seen nothing to make it stop at Holme, and the Flying Scotsman whilst catching up with it had run through a number of signals which were showing 'clear' although their levers had been set to 'danger'.

== Narrative ==
=== Great Northern Railway equipment and practices ===
==== Geography ====
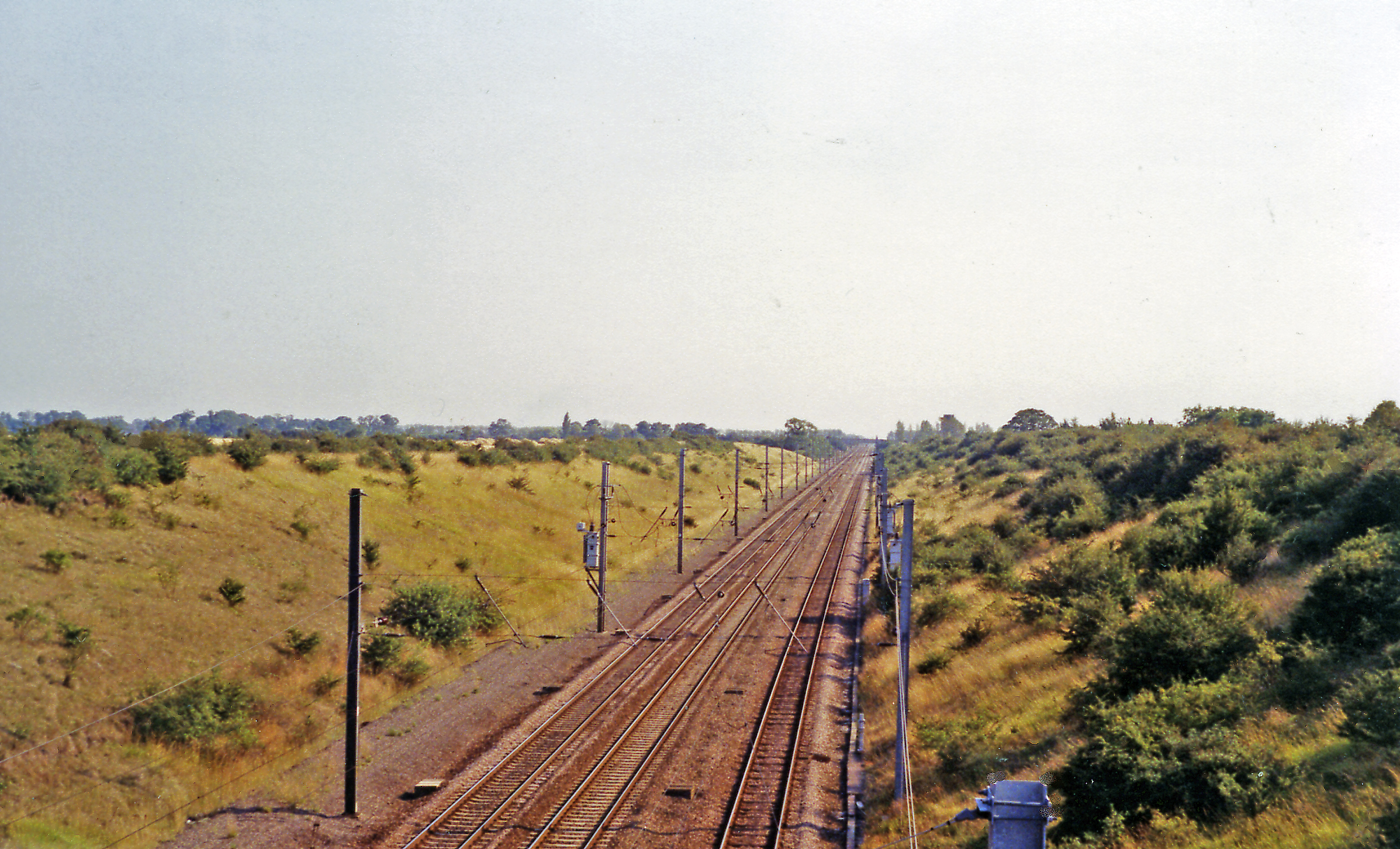
Site of the former Abbots Ripton station, near where the disaster occurred

Abbots Ripton is about 4.5 miles (7.2 km) north of Huntingdon (and 12.8 miles (20.6 km) south of Peterborough) on the East Coast Main Line, which handled both fast passenger trains and slow goods (largely coal) traffic. North of Peterborough passenger and coal traffic took different routes. South of Peterborough, they shared the same route; this was twin track in 1876, but stations with 'shunting sidings' were provided at frequent intervals to avoid slow goods trains, typically travelling at 20 mph (32 km/h), obstructing fast trains such as the prestigious 'Scotch express', which averaged 45 mph (72 km/h) (hence its unofficial nickname The Flying Scotsman), A slow train being caught up by a faster one would stop at such a station and reverse into the shunting siding, taking about four minutes to clear the main line. After the fast train had passed, the slow train would resume its journey. Abbots Ripton station had a shunting siding; for a south-bound ('up') train the previous siding was 5.8 miles (9.3 km) further north at Holme, 7 miles (11 km) south of Peterborough.

==== Block working ====
Traffic along the line was regulated by block working. Abbots Ripton and Holme had signal boxes and between them were two intermediate boxes. All controlled 'home' signals near the box and 'distant' signals about half a mile (c. 800 m (2,600 ft)) before the home signals. The line was thus divided into three blocks, each roughly 2 miles (3.2 kilometres) long; entry to each block was controlled by the signal box at the start of the block. Shunting into the siding at Abbots Ripton took place in a fourth block. The 'home' signals at Abbots Ripton were interlocked with the siding points, so that whenever the points were open to the main line the Abbots Ripton home signal lever had to be at 'danger'.

All boxes could communicate with adjacent boxes by their block telegraph. Signals were normally kept at 'all clear' but were set to 'danger' to protect trains as follows. When a train entered a block by passing a home signal, the signalman would set the home signal to 'danger', thus preventing a following train entering the same block. The distant would also be set to 'danger'. Trains were required to stop at a home signal at 'danger', but were allowed to pass a distant signal at 'danger' as this merely warned an approaching driver to moderate his speed to be ready to stop the train at the home signal. Both signals would be returned to 'all clear' when the next box telegraphed 'line clear'. Normally, as soon as a train was past a box's home signal, the signalman would telegraph 'line clear' to the preceding box. During foggy or snowy weather, however, when a train stopped at a station 'line clear' was not sent until the train had restarted, or been shunted into a siding. In good weather therefore a goods train being shunted into a siding at Abbots Ripton should have been protected against another train running into it by the Abbots Ripton 'home' and 'distant' signals; in falling snow, the home and distant signals of the previous box should have given further protection and the fast train should always have been at least one full block away.

Signal boxes serving stations/sidings had, as well as the block telegraph, 'speaking telegraph' instruments. These were not telephones, but Morse code senders, used for messages (for example how late a train was running).

==== Signals ====
On the Great Northern Railway, the signals used in conjunction with the block system were lower quadrant semaphores. (Note: for a drawing & description see https://www.railsigns.uk/sect2page1.html) They were connected to a lever in the signal box by a wire under tension, which passed over intermediate pulleys to a counterweighted arm on a signal post.

To set a signal to "all clear", the signalman pulled the appropriate lever in his signal box, which caused the wire to pull the signal arm down and into a slot on the signal post, against the force of a counterweight. When the lever was moved to set the signal to "danger", it did not positively elevate the signal to the horizontal danger position, but caused the wire to become slack, allowing the counterweight to raise the arm to the horizontal position. (Note: When working to the older time-interval system, an intermediate position had been used to indicate "proceed with caution", involving the arm pointing downwards at 45 degrees to the signal post. Under the block system, the "caution" position was no longer used, but some witnesses in the inquiry used it as a point of reference for how far below horizontal the signal arms were dropping.)

During the day, the signal arms were normally visible from the signal box from which they were worked, so the system had no repeater in the signal box to confirm that a signal was actually showing the aspect corresponding to the position of the lever.

In an emergency, the signal could be set to "danger" by cutting the wire, but a heavy weight lying on the wire might pull on it, incorrectly keeping the signal at "all clear". Since the signals were normally set at "all clear", anything which stopped the arm moving out of the slot in the signal post would lead to the signal incorrectly indicating "all clear".

At night, or in poor visibility, an oil lamp displayed a white light when the signal was at "all clear" When the signal arm was raised to the horizontal “danger” position, a red lens was moved in front of the light, so that a red light was displayed to oncoming trains. Also in poor visibility, GNR regulations called for warning detonators to be laid, if possible, on the track at the home signal when it was set to danger. At stations where platelayers were available, detonators were also to be placed on the track at distant signals.

==== Brakes ====
The express trains were made up of non-bogie non-corridor four- or six-wheel carriages. There were 13 on the Leeds express, giving a weight (including the engine and tender) of somewhat over 200 tons. At this period, other railways often had to resort to using more than one engine to maintain a high top speed; the Great Northern (favoured with the Stirling 8-foot singles) prided itself on not doing so. As with all the other railways, though, it had considerable difficulties in stopping the trains rapidly once they were at speed. To stop a train, the driver could shut off steam, get his fireman to apply a handbrake (Note: To avoid confusion, modern spelling is used, but the prevailing spelling at the time was "break") on the tender and put the engine into reverse. He had no means of applying brakes to the rest of the train; indeed most of the carriages had no brakes. Two or three of the carriages were brake carriages with handbrakes, each with a guard who would apply them when (and if) he heard the driver "whistle for brakes".

In trials carried out after the accident under favourable conditions this was shown to bring the train to rest within 800–1,150 yards (2,400–3,450 feet) when travelling at 40–45 mph (64–72 km/h). The Railway Inspectors considered that much shorter stopping distances would be possible if passenger trains were provided with continuous brakes operable by the driver, and had urged such systems be fitted. This had been resisted by the railway companies as unnecessary, unreliable, expensive and dangerous. (Note: Dangerous because it would not increase safety margins once engine drivers realised it allowed them to go faster and/or brake later in safety – similar to the counter-intuitive argument now applied (apparently with some validity) against making cars safer for their drivers – and they would be in a worst case if the brakes failed)

==== Flying Scotsman ====
On the night of the accident, the Scotch express had 10 passenger carriages. These were first- or second-class; as customary the train did not carry third-class passengers. Notable passengers included the Russian Ambassador, the deputy chairman (Note: Charles Colville, 1st Viscount Colville of Culross) and another director (Note: Robert Tennant, Member of Parliament for Leeds) of the Great Northern, and a director (John Cleghorn, formerly company secretary) and the chief engineer (Thomas Elliot Harrison, a past president of the Institution of Civil Engineers) of the North Eastern Railway. At the inquest, the coroner's summing up noted that it was a heavy responsibility to stop a train, but did not explicitly suggest the prestige of the Scotch express aggravated the responsibility.

=== The first collision ===
General scene of the scene of the accident (The Illustrated London News, 1876)

On the afternoon of 21 January, the Peterborough–Huntingdon area was experiencing a very bad snow storm; more than one witness at the Inquiry said they had never known worse: "freezing blowing and snowing ... bad for seeing signals". Crucially, the snow/sleet fell onto already cold ground and equipment, freezing on them. (Note: Further north telegraph wires accumulated ice to a diameter of 3 in (76 mm) and brought the telegraph poles down)

The southbound coal train had left Peterborough about 18 minutes late, and therefore with about 12 minutes less lead on the Flying Scotsman than normal. It progressed steadily to Abbots Ripton where it stopped by the signalbox (at about 6.41) and on the instructions of the Abbots Ripton signalman began to shunt into the siding, as normal, to let the Flying Scotsman overtake. The signalman urged the driver to hurry up, as he was "keeping the Scotchman standing at Wood Walton [the previous signal box]".

The signalman at Holme had been concerned that, because the coal train was so late, if it went on to Abbots Ripton before shunting into a siding the Flying Scotsman would be delayed. To avoid this, he had decided to stop the train at Holme and put it into a siding there. He set his signal levers to put his signals to danger, but when the coal train arrived at Holme at 6.21 pm it did not stop. He telegraphed to Abbots Ripton that the train had run past the signals, (Note: to let Abbots Ripton know they would be shunting the coal train into the siding, not as a warning about signals misbehaving) and told the stationmaster at Holme that the train had disobeyed the signals. As the Inquiry report noted "The evidence as to what then happened at the Holme station was unsatisfactorily given, and is not clear".

The Holme station master told the enquiry that he then sent for the platelayers; whilst waiting for them he checked the up line home signal and saw it to be at 'danger'. However, when a down express went through he noticed that one of the signals did not go to 'danger' after it had passed. (Note: If true, this would be about 6.25, and hence after the Scotsman had left Peterborough (6.24)) This appeared considerably at variance with other testimony.

The platelayers had to be sent for because they had been allowed to go home at the end of their normal working day, despite the weather. Their foreman was uneasy about this and came out of his house to watch the up distant signal whilst two trains went past: the first of these was the Manchester express, running about 13 minutes behind the Scotsman; the second a slow stopping passenger train, a further 6 minutes behind when it left Peterborough. As he feared, the signal showed a white light throughout. He put his work clothes back on and went to the signal. The arm was weighed down with snow; once he had shaken this off by working the arm up and down it showed a red light. He then walked to the station; on his way he met a platelayer despatched to the distant signal by the stationmaster.

Other witnesses also gave evidence strongly suggesting that the platelayers were not summoned until after the Scotsman had passed and were not back at work until after the Manchester express had passed (c 6.50.). They reported that other signals (including the up home signal) were – when first checked – in the same state as the up distant. The signalman also claimed that the stationmaster had reported the up home signal to not be working properly.

The Scotch express had left Peterborough at 6.24, about 6 minutes late. It did not slacken speed for the bad weather; it passed through Holme at about 6.37, the signals all showing clear, and arrived at Wood Walton at 6.40. The signalman there had set his signal levers to put his signals to 'danger' to protect the shunting at Abbots Ripton, but had not left his levers to set detonators at the home signal, nor did he supplement his fixed signals by displaying a hand-lamp from the signal box. He told the inquiry he was busy stopping a train of empty coal wagons on the down line, and because of the weather he did not hear the express until it ran past his cabin at full speed. At 6.44 the Scotsman reached Abbots Ripton, its driver having seen "nothing but white lights all the way from Peterboro". It was at full speed (40–45 mph) when it crashed into the coal train, which had not yet cleared the main line. Some coal wagons were smashed, but the coal train engine itself was largely unscathed. The express engine derailed and veered to the right. It ended up lying on its side, beyond the down line. Behind it, its tender and two passenger carriages were obstructing the down line.

=== The second collision ===
The railway workers involved were badly shaken – some admitted it took them a few minutes to fully gather their wits (Note: 'I did not recover myself for five or six minutes' – evidence of Joseph Bray; 'I recovered myself in three or four minutes' – evidence of Edward Faulkner) but the guards (whose duty it was to 'protect their train') were affected to a lesser extent. The guard of the express walked back up the up line towards Wood Walton, laying fog-signals (detonators) on the rails to warn any further trains to stop. Despite the signals showing 'all clear', the Manchester express stopped in response to the Wood Walton signalman using a hand-lamp to show a red light from his signal-box. It finally pulled up beyond the Wood Walton down distant signal; the Abbots Ripton up distant signal could be seen ahead showing the white “all clear”. (Note: which would imply that it took over a mile to stop) It then proceeded cautiously towards Abbots Ripton, being stopped successively by the Scotsman guard waving a red hand-lamp and then by a platelayer, eventually drawing up at the rear of the wrecked Scotsman.

The fireman of the coal train similarly laid detonators on the down line just inside the Abbots Ripton down distant signal, and was then picked up by the coal train engine running light to Huntingdon to seek assistance and warn approaching down trains. This was at the instigation of a GNR “relief clerk” (i.e. a clerk qualified to act as a ‘’locum’’ stationmaster) who had been travelling on the express. (Note: A London and North Western Railway traffic inspector also travelling on the express is noted by contemporary newspapers to have given practical assistance. Contemporary newspaper accounts e.g. that in the Sunderland Echo Monday 24 January 1876 say that Abbots Ripton was not like Holme 'a station with an agent etc. in charge' but 'merely a signalling box'. If Abbots Ripton had a station master on duty that night he did not give evidence to the inquiry, nor do other witnesses mention him)

The scene of Saturday night (The Illustrated London News, 1876)

The Abbots Ripton signalman was evidently dazed by the events; he set his signals in both directions to 'danger' but did not (as he should also have done) immediately send the 5-beat 'obstruction danger' bell signal to Stukeley, the next signal box south. Instead he tried to send a message reporting the crash and seeking assistance by the speaking telegraph to Huntingdon station to the south. (Note: There were two signal boxes at Huntingdon; Huntingdon North and Huntingdon South; both were on the 'speaking telegraph' – to contact the stationmaster at Huntingdon to get assistance Abbots Ripton should have 'spoken' to Huntingdon South (which is what he did, or rather attempted); to maximise the chances of getting the train held at Huntingdon North (which he did not)) He prefixed the message with the special 'SP' code indicating top priority but the signalman at Huntingdon did not answer. The Abbots Ripton signalman kept trying to raise Huntingdon, but without success; when the Huntingdon signalman did answer he first refused to accept any message not starting with a code to indicate time sent, and rebuffed subsequent sends with an 'MQ' code – roughly translating as "Go away, I'm busy". (Note: For most signalman witnesses their length of service and time in their current post are recorded as part of their evidence – for example the Abbots Ripton duty signalman had been at Abbots Ripton since March 1874 and had been a signalman elsewhere for the previous 3 months. The corresponding details are not given for the Huntingdon signalman; they might have been relevant to his interactions with Abbots Ripton, since UK census and birth records show that one of his children was born Abbots Ripton Q3 1873) Indeed, he was; he was accepting the Leeds express and passing it on to the next signal box. At 6:52 pm, after trying and failing for 8 minutes to pass his message to Huntingdon South, the Abbots Ripton signalman sent the 5-beat 'obstruction danger' bell signal to Stukeley.

The down Leeds express passed through Huntingdon at about 6:49 pm (at which time no message had been accepted from Abbots Ripton) and reached Stukeley at 6:52 pm. The signalman at Stukeley received the 'obstruction danger' message just seconds after the express had passed. The Abbots Ripton down distant signal was showing 'all clear' and the Leeds express approached it at full speed.

I found a white light at the distant signal at Abbotts Ripton. After passing that signal post, I was alarmed by passing over two fog-signals which exploded; I at once shut off steam and told my mate to put on the tender break [sic]. I was then going at 40 or 50 miles an hour. In another instant I met an engine on the up road giving sharp whistles, (Note: The coal train engine going to Huntingdon for help. Elsewhere Wilson says he 'whistled for brakes'. The three guards on the express all told the enquiry they applied their brake in response to the whistles of the coal train engine) and saw a red lamp from it, which I took to mean that there was something out of the ordinary way. I reversed my engine, and reapplied my steam, and as soon as that was done the collision occurred

Still travelling at some speed, the Leeds express ploughed through the tender and carriages blocking the line (this, rather than the first collision, is when most – if not all – of the deaths are thought to have occurred).

The Abbots Ripton signalman had just started his 12-hour shift at 6 pm. His colleague on the day shift returned to work on hearing of the first collision, arriving soon after the second collision. He took over the speaking telegraph, because whilst the duty signalman appeared to be doing his best to send the message he was confused at the time, and I felt I was more able to send the message than he. Messages seeking assistance were then sent to Huntingdon and Peterborough.

== Inquiry ==
A Court of Inquiry was convened, and took evidence from 24 January to 17 February, issuing its report on 23 February. The inquiry rejected the conclusion of the coroner's jury that the block system was at fault and "had proved ineffective in a case of emergency", riposting "such a conclusion, natural enough on a superficial view to those who are not thoroughly versed in the subject, really results from a confusion of ideas". The problem was with signals, and any system of working railways must be ineffective if signals could not be relied upon. (Note: The Railway Inspectorate had a low opinion of the ability of inquests to see the wood for the trees. The coroner's summing up as reported in the Edinburgh Evening News of Friday 4 February 1876 as follows... he did not think it right to find the Holme stationmaster guilty of manslaughter; for it was a heavy responsibility to stop a train without urgent reason, and he placed confidence in the block system which, it appeared, had never failed except on this fatal night. If he had committed perjury, they ought not to find him guilty of manslaughter to punish him for that. The conduct of the signalman at Abbots Ripton was most lamentable but he did not think it criminal would certainly seem to have assumed that the stationmaster was justified to assume that the block system would give protection even if he knew that the signalling was failed or unreliable.)

=== Findings ===
Raising the engine from the wrecked train

The immediate cause was the accumulation of snow on the semaphore arms and/or control wire of several sets of signals. (Note: Popular retellings (including L T C Rolt Red for Danger, a standard compendium of British rail accidents) talk of the arm being frozen in the slot. The Edinburgh Evening News of Tuesday 1 February 1876 reports the inquest to have heard the previous day from platelayers that the signals were showing a white light with the signals down and they 'seemed as if frozen in the grooves' but there is no direct statement to that effect in the Inquiry; evidence of the same witnesses includes multiple mentions of the arm having risen part-way, and of the corrective action being to dislodge snow from the partly risen arm. Furthermore the Edinburgh Evening News had reported the platelayer evidence the previous day and gone no further than the signals having been considerably out of order from snow. Other details in Rolt's account (generally the more dramatic ones) don't match the Inquiry evidence.) On the night of the accident the weight of snow on some signal arms and wires meant that the arm balanced well short of the 'danger' position and that the spectacle plate failed to drop sufficiently to move a red lens in front of the white lamp displayed in the "all clear" position. The signal therefore showed a white light ("all clear") when the lever in the signal box was in fact set to danger; the snow and ice (in the words of the Inquiry Report) thus rendered the signals

not only useless for warning by red-lights the engine-driver of the Scotch-express-train, but also a means by the exhibition of white lights of luring him forward at full speed to the collision.

The inquiry had heard evidence from experienced working-level witnesses that this (or a milder manifestation of this) was a known problem on snowy days but could easily be sorted if you knew how, e.g., by "jiggling the arms". It implicitly rejected the evidence from GNR senior managers who denied that there was any prior history of problems, but made no comment on the discrepancy. (Note: No GNR documentation of the problem or how to fix it emerged, nor did all the signalmen and platelayers say they had heard of it; that would tend to suggest that GNR senior management were genuinely unaware.)

Operating practice at that time was that the signals were left in the 'clear' position continuously unless protecting a static obstruction. Consequently, the signals stood at clear for considerable periods of time, and there was little opportunity to spot the problem.

The inquiry report noted various suggested improvements to signal arrangements, but cautioned against over-elaborate solutions:

It is well that these and other proposals for improvement, which are constantly invented or advocated, such as combining sight with sound at the signals, and the use of detonators, mechanically applied, to supersede the use of fogmen, should receive full consideration and discussion, after the experience of so terrible an accident, caused mainly by the failure of existing signal-arrangements. But, in the course of such deliberations, the facts must not be lost sight of, that men are still liable to make mistakes, machinery is still liable to fail, and further complication is by no means certain in all cases to produce greater safety.

It commented adversely on the performance of individuals:

- "The want of judgement or precaution exhibited by the station-master at Holme" for not stopping the Scotsman and warning its driver of the signal problem
- "The neglect of the Wood Walton signalman" in not putting detonators down or exhibiting a red handlamp to the Scotsman
- "The delay of the signalman at the Huntingdon South" signal box in answering Abbots Ripton

and, without blaming individuals, on

- the delay in warning Stukeley of the obstruction on the down line (Note: The evidence would clearly have supported mentioning the Abbots Ripton duty signalman as responsible. The Inquiry report instead considered it unfortunate that he had not retained his presence of mind, but immediately went on to note that he had attempted to speak to Huntingdon within a minute of the crash; the inference is that the inquiry did not think him blameworthy. In the 1881 UK census he (or an exact namesake) was still a railway signalman, but at Misterton, Nottinghamshire, on a less important line; the Holme stationmaster (or an exact namesake) was stationmaster at Luton Hoo railway station, a minor station on a minor branch. The Wood Walton signalman was now a railway porter (possibly because he was now married); the Huntingdon South signalman was still a signalman in a main-line box and eventually became a station master.)
- the failure to put platelayers at signals as soon as they were needed; to clear the signals of snow or to lay down detonators if the signals could not be made to work
- "the running of fast through trains at full speed through such a storm ... without the adoption of extra precautions, such as the detention of slower trains, the use of hand-lamps in the signal-cabins, and the employment of platelayers at the signals"
- the absence of a speaking telegraph in the intermediate signal boxes
- the lack of continuous brakes on the Leeds express.

=== Recommendations ===
The Board of Trade had no regulatory powers to enforce the recommendations of the inquiry report. The most important were:

- Improving signals so that they work properly in frost and snow, and that they provide an indication to the signalman if they are not operating properly
- Keeping the signals normally at danger, so that if they stick there is unlikely to be a false 'clear'
- The use by signalmen of hand lamps in bad weather to confirm the indications of fixed signals
- The provision of telegraph apparatus in all signal boxes
- The improvement of braking systems on trains
- The suspension of less important trains, and the reduction in speed of other trains, in very severe weather conditions.

== Consequences ==
- The GNR adopted a significantly different design of semaphore signal; the 'somersault' signal. In this, the pivot about which the arm moved was at the middle of the arm; other things being equal accumulation of snow should not significantly affect the balance of the arm
- The modern practice of the default position for signals being 'danger' was adopted
- Railway companies were required by law to make an annual return to the Board of Trade on what fraction of their passenger rolling stock was fitted with continuous brakes

Over a longer timescale, and after further accidents

- Continuous braking was fitted to passenger trains
- 'All clear' was indicated by a green light (so that a broken red lens – or one out of position- no longer gave false reassurance)

== In popular culture ==
The accident was the inspiration behind the story The Flying Kipper, in the Rev. Wilbert Awdry's book Henry the Green Engine.

== Notes and references ==
Notes
