= Railway semaphore signal =

Form of fixed railway signal

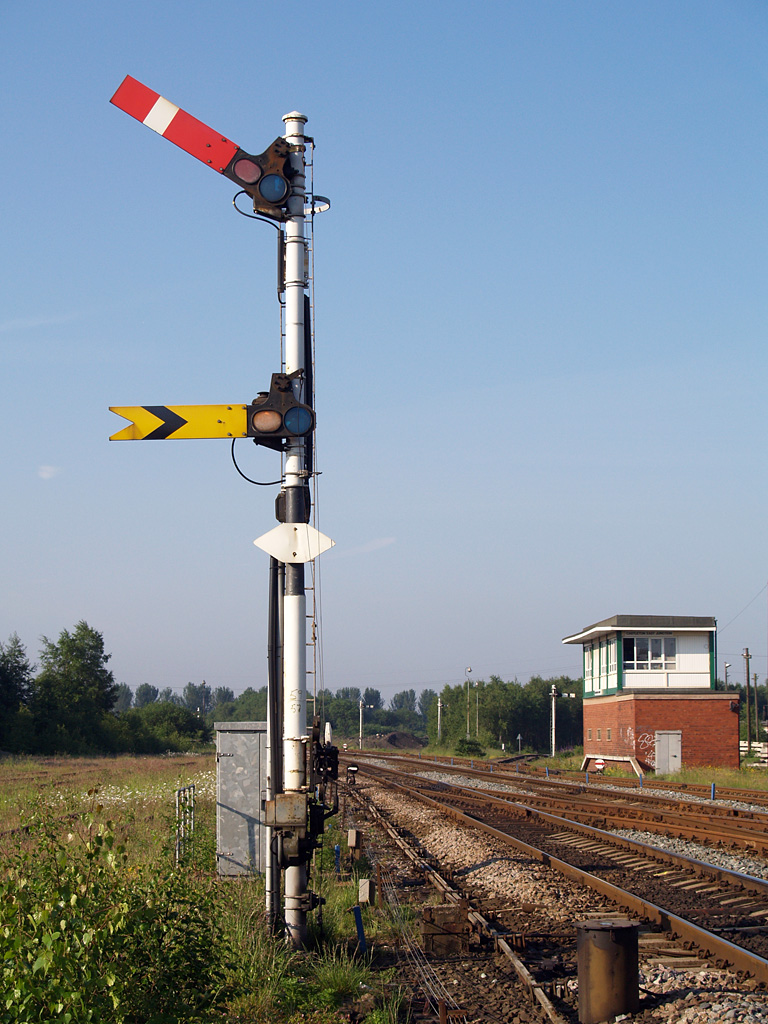
Upper quadrant semaphore signals at Castleton East Junction in England

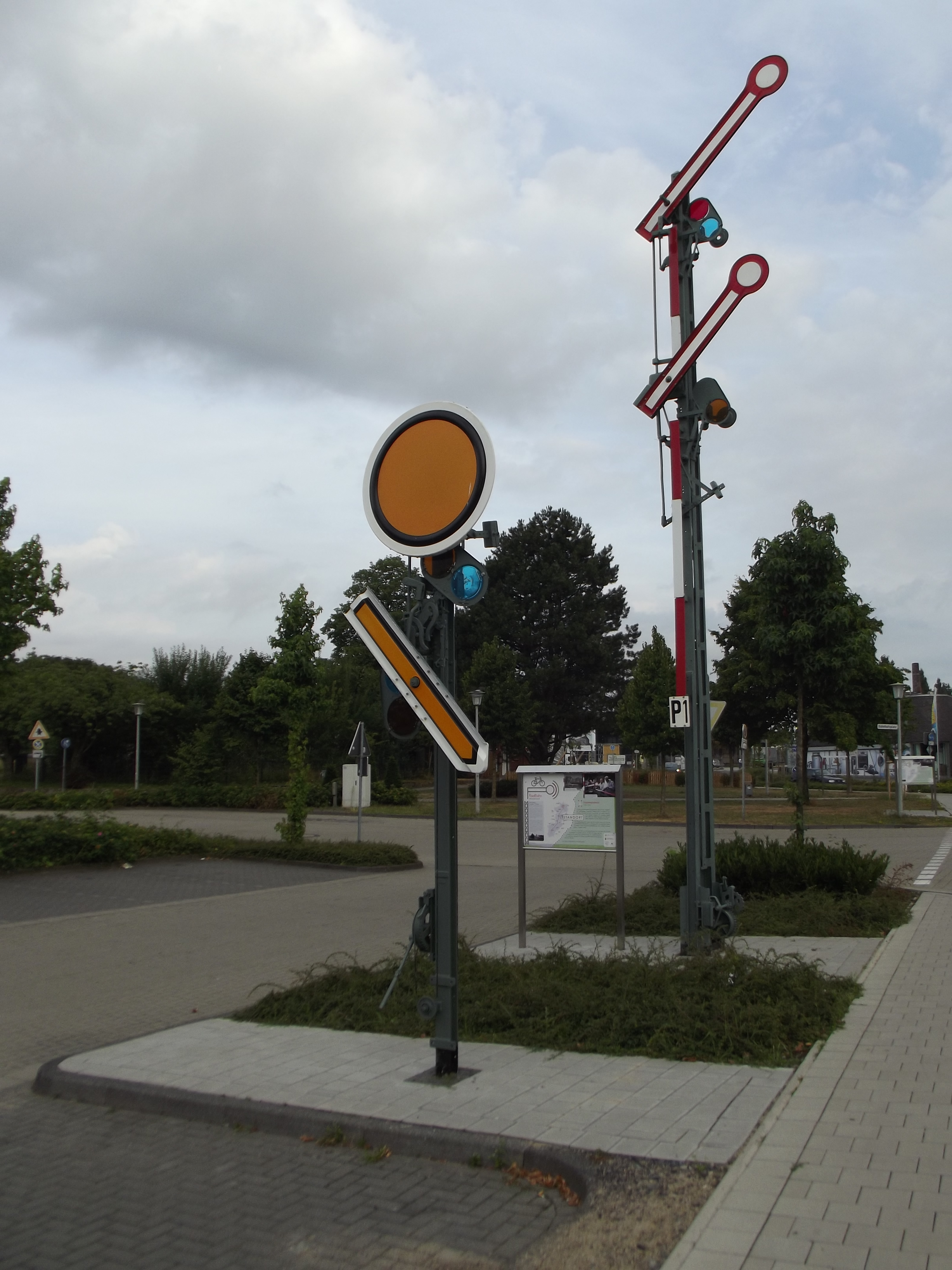
German semaphore distant (left) and home (right) signal exhibition in Steinfurt, Germany

Railway semaphore signals are an early form of fixed railway signals. The semaphore system involves signals that display their different indications to train drivers by changing the angle of inclination of a pivoted 'arm'. Semaphore signals were patented in the early 1840s by Joseph James Stevens, and soon became the most widely used form of mechanical signal. Designs have altered over the intervening years, and colour light signals have replaced semaphore signals in most countries, but in a few they remain in use.

== Origins ==
The first railway semaphore signal was erected by Charles Hutton Gregory in about 1842, on the London and Croydon Railway (later the London Brighton and South Coast Railway) at New Cross, southeast London, as part of the newly enlarged layout also accommodating the South Eastern Railway. John Urpeth Rastrick claimed to have suggested the idea to Hutton Gregory.

The semaphore was swiftly embraced across Britain and North America as a fixed manual signalling system, surpassing all other types in most applications by 1870. Becoming electrically operated and automatic, accompanied by interlocking, they were widely adopted in the U.S. After 1908, with the advent of the Union Switch & Signal types "B" & "S", and the General Railway Signal Company's universal Model 2A mechanisms, manual semaphores and earlier electric disc signals quickly began to disappear.

== Form ==
=== Components ===
The British semaphore signal arm consists of two parts: A wooden or metal arm (or "blade") which pivots at different angles, and a spectacle holding coloured lenses which move in front of a lamp in order to provide indications at night. Usually these were combined into a single frame, though in some types (e.g. "somersault" signals in which the arm pivoted in the centre), the arm was separate from the spectacle. The arm projects horizontally in its most restrictive aspect; other angles indicate less restrictive aspects. On double lines in Great Britain signal posts are generally placed on the left of the track and always with the semaphore arm(s) facing left with the spectacle and lamp on the right of the post or doll (but on the left of the post or doll for upper-quadrant signals). Sighting problems may mean that the post is placed on the right of the other line on double track branches and on single lines, could be placed either side of the track. North American semaphore equivalents faced right, and as generally on the European continent, on double track branches, up and down lines are opposite to those in the UK.

Depending on the arm's position, the appropriately coloured lens is illuminated from behind by either an oil lamp, a gas lamp, or an incandescent lamp run at a low voltage (white LED clusters have also been tested for this purpose). Where a green light was required, a blue lens would usually be used. When combined with the mainly yellow-emitting flame of an oil lamp, this produced a green colour; it was important that the resultant colour was not even yellow-green in appearance, as this could have been confused for a distant signal at 'caution'. Later signals using electric lamps used green lenses. Some signals converted to electric lamps from oil, used a yellow-tinted bulb with the original blue lens to maintain the correct colour or from 1996 on the Western Region of British Railways, a 12-volt 5-watt bulb was fitted but fed at 10.7 volts to produce a brilliance approximating to the colour temperature of an oil wick flame, thus providing a correct red or green aspect during darkness.

Most railways in Great Britain employed lower-quadrant semaphores, where the arm dropped from the horizontal 'danger' aspect to 'clear' at up to 60° below horizontal. Variations in appearance between main and subsidiary lines or sidings also existed. On some companies' lines, a three-aspect semaphore prevailed and these showed an intermediate 'Caution' aspect and thus bore a three-lensed spectacle. In 1911, the Metropolitan Line was first to use an upper-quadrant semaphore, the idea being brought over from the United States.

Following nationalisation in 1948, British Railways standardised on upper-quadrant semaphores, and all regions gradually adopted that mode, replacing lower-quadrant signals. However, the Western Region stayed with their well-proven lower-quadrant semaphores, with a heavy cast iron spectacle bearing circular coloured glasses eventually replacing the former thinly bordered cast spectacle frame with shaped coloured glasses. The main arms were 4 feet (1.2 m) long and subsidiaries 3 feet (0.91 m) with other subsidiaries 2 feet (0.61 m) long on these signals. Previous GWR 5-foot (1.5 m) arms placed if higher than 26 feet (7.9 m) above rail level, were changed to 4 feet (1.2 m). All replacements were of enamelled steel and bore the appropriate arm colours, red with white band for 'Stop' arm and chevroned yellow arm with black chevron for 'Distant' (Caution) arms. Both types are white on the reverse side with black band or chevron as appropriate. The final 'Call-on', 'Shunt' or 'Warning' arms on the Western Region were 2 feet (0.61 m) with red-white-red horizontal stripes and showed a reduced light during darkness with the appropriate black letter, C, S or W, back-lit in the 'proceed' state with a green light shown in that mode. The stop aspect was generally lunar-white during darkness. All are now removed, but examples can be seen on UK heritage lines. As at 2020, there are only a few remaining semaphore signals on the Western Region of Network Rail, LED signals having replaced the majority of semaphores.

Materials that were commonly used to make signal posts for semaphore signals included timber, lattice steel, tubular steel and concrete. The Southern Railway in Great Britain frequently made use of old rail for signal posts.

German semaphore home signals, which are totally different in appearance to the British semaphore signal, include one or two white arms with a red outline and a small circular disk at the end of it, and coloured lenses which display the position of the aspect(s) of the signal during nighttime operation and these arms face right of the post. German semaphore distant signals consist of one yellow disk with a black and white outline and an (optional) thin yellow arrow-shaped disk with a black and white outline. Both the disk and arrow have coloured lenses to aid drivers during nighttime. Those types were to be seen in some other countries which used German signalling principles.

=== Lower quadrant and upper quadrant ===
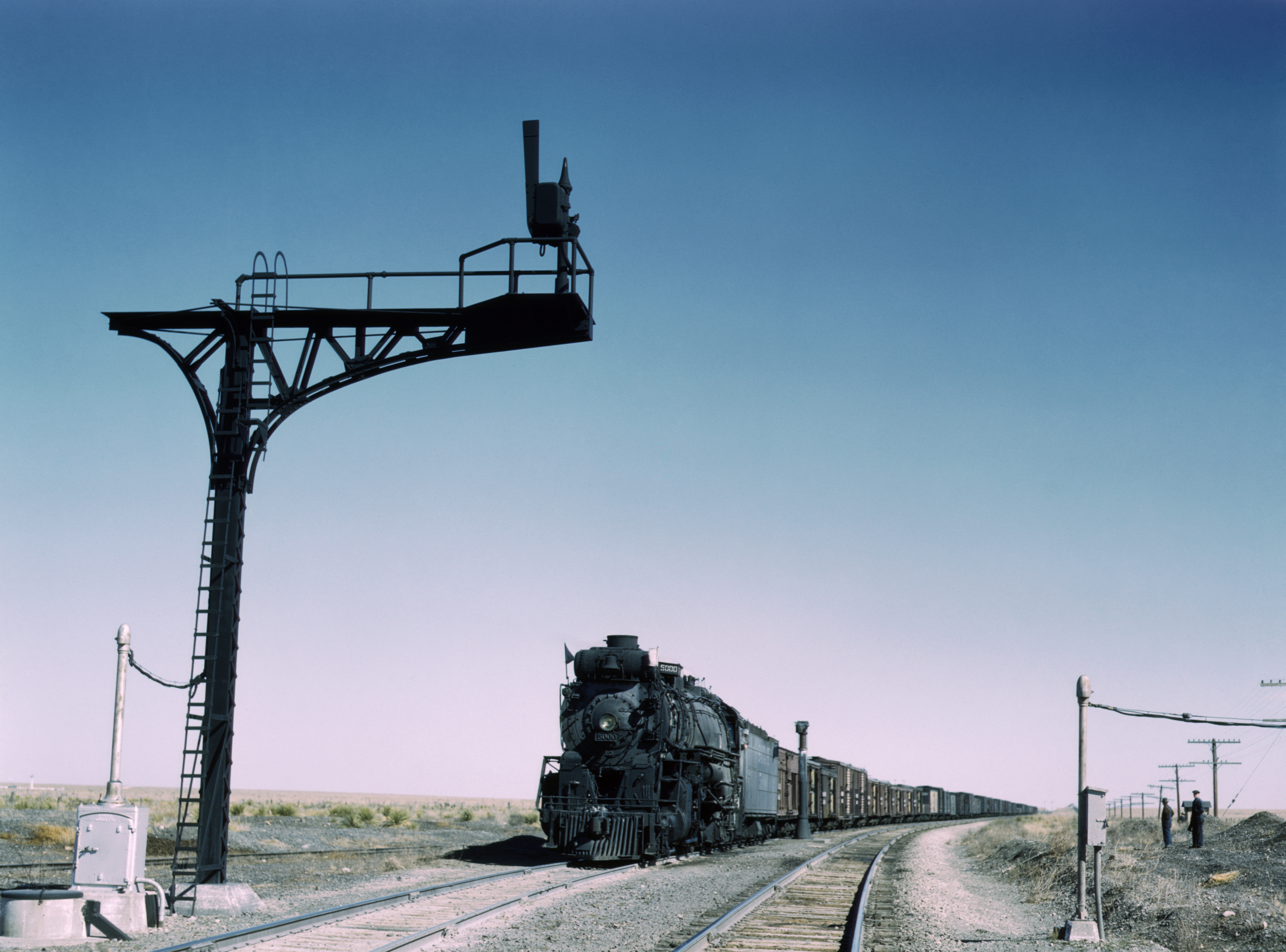
Upper-quadrant signal on the Santa Fe Railroad, 1943. The vertical position indicates a "clear" aspect.

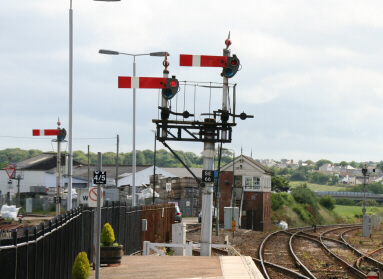
Lower-quadrant stop signals at St. Erth in 2007

British semaphores come in lower-quadrant and upper-quadrant forms. In a lower-quadrant signal, the arm pivots downwards for the less restrictive (known as "off") indication. Upper-quadrant signals, as the name implies, pivot the arm upward for "off".

During the 1870s, all the British railway companies standardised on the use of semaphore signals, which were then invariably all of the lower-quadrant type. From the 1920s onwards, upper-quadrant semaphores almost totally supplanted lower-quadrant signals in Great Britain, except on former GWR lines. The advantage of the upper-quadrant signal is that should the signal wire break, or the signal arm be weighed down by snow (for instance), gravity will tend to cause the signal to drop to the safe "danger" position. In a lower-quadrant signal, the opposite may happen, sending the signal to "off" when in fact it should be illustrating "danger". Their spectacle cases, which are on the opposite side of the spindle on which the signal arm is pivoted, are therefore required to be sufficiently heavy to prevent this happening.

Current British practice mandates that semaphore signals, both upper- and lower-quadrant types, are inclined at an angle of 45 degrees from horizontal to display an "off" indication.

=== Two-position and three-position signals ===
The first British railway semaphore signals had arms that could be worked to three positions, in the lower quadrant. Used in conjunction with the time-interval system, the arm horizontal meant "danger", inclined downwards at 45 degrees meant "caution" and the arm vertical (arm hidden within the post) meant "clear". The vertical indication gradually came to be discontinued as the absolute block system superseded time-interval working. The Great Northern Railway was the first company to introduce "somersault" signals, mounted away from the post, after an accident in January 1876 when a train passed a signal giving a false "clear" aspect because the signal arm had frozen into its slot during a blizzard.

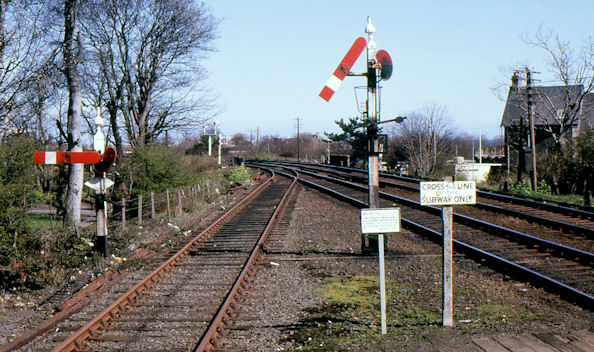
Somersault signals at Carrickfergus railway station, showing the distinctive central pivot about which the arm "somersaults"

A later development was the upper-quadrant three-position semaphore signal. These worked in the upper quadrant to distinguish them from the then standard two-position lower-quadrant semaphores. When the arm is inclined upwards at 45 degrees, the meaning is "caution" and the arm in the vertical position means "clear". Thus, three indications can be conveyed with just one arm and without the need for a distant arm on the same post. The early abandonment of the three-position semaphore signal in the UK allowed for the widespread replacement of two-position lower-quadrant signals by two-position upper-quadrant signals.

=== Colouring and shape of arm ===
Red was quickly chosen as the best colour for semaphore arms as it was clearly visible against most backgrounds. To enhance the visibility of the arm, a marking of contrasting colour, such as a stripe or spot, is usually applied. The rear of the arm is usually coloured white with a black marking.

Where particularly poor background contrast cannot be avoided, a sighting board (usually painted white) can be placed behind the arm to provide adequate contrast which improves visibility. Alternatively, part of a bridge abutment conveniently located behind a signal may be painted white.

From 1872, distant signal arms (see below) were distinguished by having a "fishtail" notch cut into the end. All signal arms were still painted red at this time. In the 1920s, the British railway companies began to colour their distant signal arms yellow to better distinguish them from the red stop signals. The red lenses in distant signals were changed to yellow at the same time. The practice of using red distant arms has survived in some countries however.

A third type of arm with a pointed end extending outward is often used (though not in the UK) to indicate that the signal operates automatically (as in automatic block signalling systems) and in many cases indicates that the signal is 'permissive', and can be passed when showing its most restrictive aspect, at a low speed.

For most types of semaphore arm, the colour of light shown when the arm is in the "on" (most restrictive) position generally corresponds to the colour of the arm itself (i.e. red for a stop signal, yellow for a distant signal). When the arm is in the "off" position, a green light is displayed.

Other shapes and colours of semaphore arms were used for specific purposes in different countries around the world.

== Operation ==
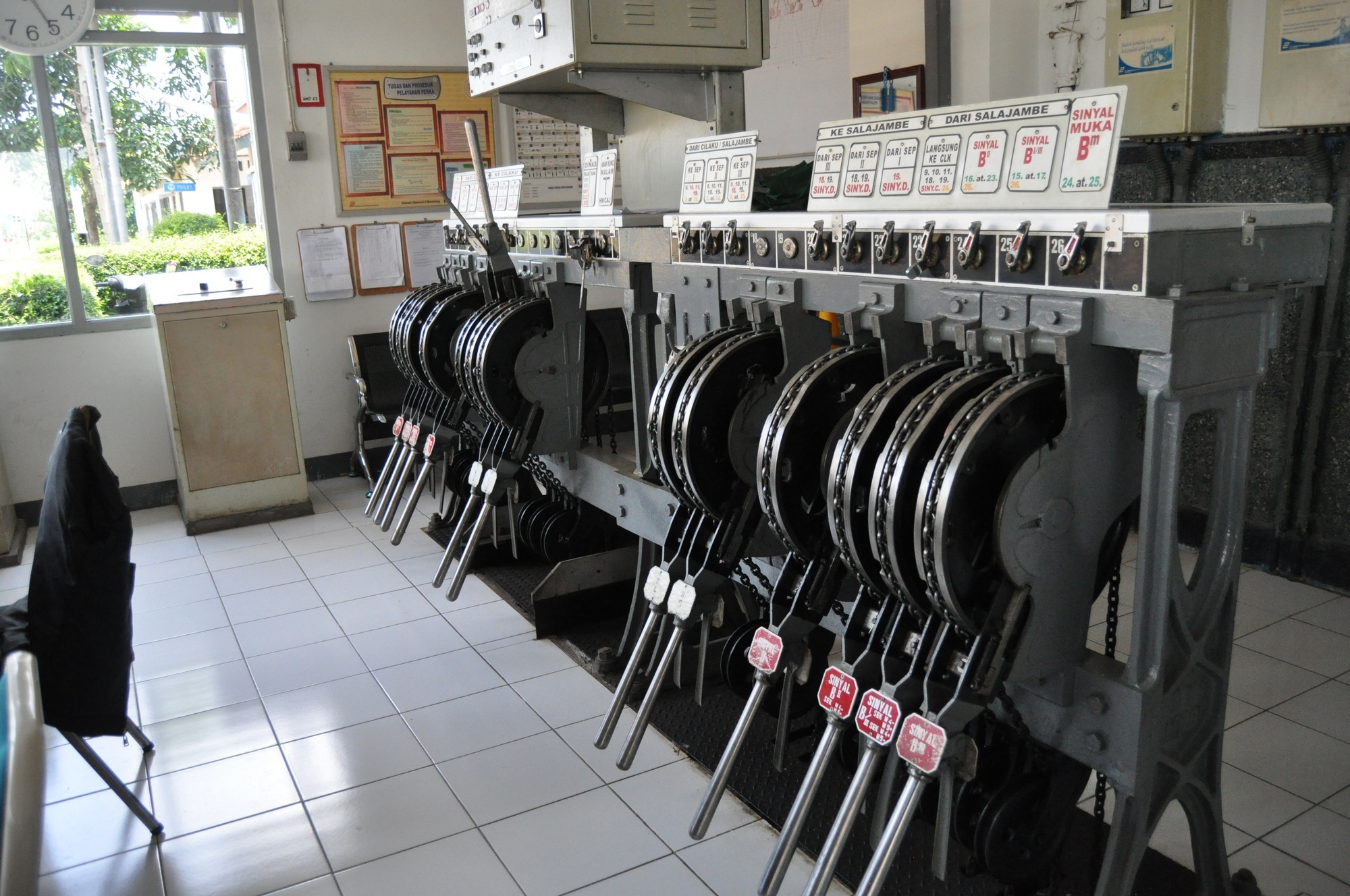
Semaphore signal levers inside train dispatcher's room of Cianjur railway station. These levers are connected to the signal by pairs of wires.

Worldwide, the first semaphore signals were controlled by levers situated at the signals. Some early signals protruded from the roof of the controlling signal box. Later, remote operation was effected by levers connected to the signal by single wires (UK), pairs of wires (Continental Europe), or pipes supported on rollers (North America). The levers were grouped together in a building known as a "signal box" (UK and Australia) or "interlocking tower" (North America). In the UK multiple signal wires were grouped together, and in station areas were commonly routed beneath platform faces just above rail level. The operation of a single signal wire would cause some of the adjacent wires to 'jangle', and this noise was one of the many characteristic sounds of railway travel until the gradual introduction of colour-light signals from the mid 20th century.

Semaphore signals may also be operated by electric motors, hydraulically or pneumatically, allowing them to be located further from the controlling signal box. In some cases, they can be made to work automatically. The signals are designed to be fail-safe so that if power is lost or a linkage is broken, the arm will move by gravity into the horizontal position. For lower quadrant semaphores this requires the spectacle case to be sufficiently heavy to ensure the arm rises rather than falls; this is one of the reasons for the widespread switch to upper quadrant signals. (The purpose of the balance weight often found on a lever lower down the post of a semaphore signal is actually to ensure the signal wire returns to its normal position when the controlling lever is put back. Otherwise, again, the signal could fail to return to danger. These counterweights are used just as commonly on upper- as on lower-quadrant signals.)

== Usage ==
The following section describes semaphore signals as they were and are used with absolute block signalling in the United Kingdom.

=== Stop signals ===
British semaphore stop signal (lower quadrant type)

A stop signal is any signal whose most restrictive indication is 'danger' (which compels a stop). Stop signals are used to protect junctions, points (North America - 'switches'), level crossings, movable bridges, platforms or block sections.

A particular signal box may control one or more stop signals on each running line. In a traditional mechanically signalled area in the United Kingdom, it is most common for a signal box to have two stop signals governing each line. The first reached by a train is known as the home signal. The last stop signal, known as the starting or section signal, is usually located past the points etc. and controls entry to the block section ahead. The distance between the home and starting signals is usually quite short (typically a few hundred yards), and allows a train to wait for the section ahead of it to clear without blocking the line all the way back to the previous section.

German home semaphore signals (Hauptformsignale) can display a danger aspect if the upper arm is in a 90 degree position (horizontal), and can display a proceed aspect if the upper arm is in a 45 degree position (diagonal). Home signals may have an additional lower arm which can display a proceed at reduced speed (40 km/h); however, these are not mandatory.

==== Outer home ====
At some locations, more than one home signal might be provided on the same line. These will be identified by names such as outer home and inner home, or first home, second home etc.

An outer home generally protects a 'clearing point' of 1/4 mile (440 yd; 400 m) clear of any points or sidings. This allows trains to approach when the station or junction is obstructed by another train.

==== Advanced starting ====
An advanced starting signal might be used at a location where it might be desirable to advance a train from a station platform before the section ahead becomes available. In this scenario, the starting signal permits the train to draw forward from the station area toward the advanced starting signal, which controls entry to the section ahead.

If any of the signals beyond the first stop signal are at 'danger', the previous signals will also be held at 'danger' until the train is almost at a stand, to indicate to the driver that the next signal is at 'danger'. This can be enforced by instruction or by electrical interlocking, which requires the provision of a track circuit on the approach to the signal.

In North America, the foregoing terminology was not used, as the development of North American signalling practice diverged from that in the United Kingdom during the late nineteenth century. In North America, where the term home signal is in common usage, it generally refers to the "generic" British definition of 'stop signal', namely any signal whose most restrictive indication is 'danger'.

=== Distant signals ===
British semaphore distant signal (lower quadrant type)

A signal that provides advance warning of a stop signal ahead (and which does not compel a stop when in its most restrictive position) is referred to as distant signal. The term originated in the UK and is used throughout the English-speaking world. In some regions, notably North America, the terms distant signal and approach signal are both in common usage.

Because of the long distance required to bring a moving train to a stand, distant signals must be located on the approach to the corresponding stop signal by at least the braking distance of the worst braked train to use the route. This is particularly important on high-speed routes. At one time it was practice to take sighting distance into account when positioning distant signals; the distant signal could therefore be positioned at less than braking distance to the corresponding stop signal.

The driver of a train encountering a distant signal at 'caution' must expect the first home signal to be at 'danger' and must adjust the train's speed so as to bring the train to a stand before reaching it. The driver of a train encountering a distant signal in the 'clear' position knows that all applicable stop signals controlled by the same signal box are in the 'clear' position.

This is enforced by interlocking; the distant signal is prevented from assuming the 'clear' position unless all relevant stop signals controlled by the signal box display 'clear'.

Unlike British signals, all German home signals have a respective distant signal, which may be operated from the same lever.

A typical signal box layout. The crossover and level crossing are protected by the home signal, while a starting signal guards the entrance to the next block section.

==== Changes in colour and meaning ====
In the U.K., until the 1920s, distant signals were coloured red, with a red light at night. Given that their meanings were different, it was obviously unsatisfactory to have both home and distant signals showing the same colour, but one of the problems which delayed a change in the colour of distant signals to yellow was the lack of a suitable yellow glass for the spectacle frame. Some British railway companies used the Coligny-Welch signal lamp to clarify night aspects; this was fitted to distant signals and showed a white vee in addition to the main red or green light. The Ministry of Transport recommended that the colour of distant signal arms and spectacles be altered from red to yellow in the early 1920s, although this was not universally adopted in the UK until the late 1920s. Since this time, the yellow caution aspect has remained a British railway standard.

The Victorian Railways in Australia changed only isolated distant signals, leaving combined home and distant signals showing green over red at the caution position. The New South Wales Government Railways retained the red distant signal everywhere, adding a fixed upper green light so that an isolated distant signal displayed green over red, like a combined home and distant signal at caution.

In the 19th century, a distant signal on the Victorian Railways required the train to stop when the signal was at red, not just to proceed with caution as is the case now. However, having stopped at a distant signal at red, the train could then proceed carefully to the home signal, being prepared to stop short of any obstruction between the two signals. Thus the distant signal at that time was a bit like a later "outer home" signal. That practice at a distant signal at that time may have been a factor in the Sunshine rail accident of 1908.

=== Combined stop and distant signals ===
British semaphore stop and distant signals on common post (lower quadrant type)

Where signal boxes are closely spaced, a stop signal and a distant signal can be mounted on the same post, with Station 2's distant underneath Station 1's starter. The two signals are "slotted" so that the distant signal can only move to "clear" if the stop signal is also clear. Both signals display a light at night, which means that the 'danger' indication appears as red over yellow.

When this arrangement doesn't allow for an adequate braking distance, an 'outer' and 'inner' distant is employed, with the outer distant being under the stop signal prior to the starter as well. Exceptional circumstances may lead to a distant being 'triple-slotted' with three signal boxes' clearance required to clear the signal.

Exceptionally in New South Wales, home and distant signals controlled from the same signal box would be installed, especially on outer home signals, which specifies to the driver where to stop.

=== Shunting and subsidiary signals ===
Shunting signals and subsidiary signals also exist in semaphore form, with smaller arms and lights than are provided for main signals. These signals may also take the form of a disc with a horizontal stripe which is rotated 45 degrees to the clear position.

=== Train order signals ===
In North America, the earliest semaphores were employed as train order signals, with the purpose of indicating to engineers whether they should stop to receive either a "19 Order" or a "31 Order" telegraphed.

Train order signals were typically located at the station building or signal tower, with a tall common post mounting signal arms facing in opposing directions. These were supplemented by Automatic Block Signal semaphores (a U.S. invention), first pneumatically powered in the 1880s and then by the 1890s, automatic electric motor-driven semaphores were correctly seen as the future and were continued in manufacture well into World War II. Although the U.S. invented and manufactured 2-arm lower quadrant electro-gas and 3-position upper quadrant electric semaphores were experimented with in the U.K. (such as the ECML, at London Victoria, respectively and in isolated areas elsewhere) they never were widely adopted by any means.

=== Non-railway uses ===
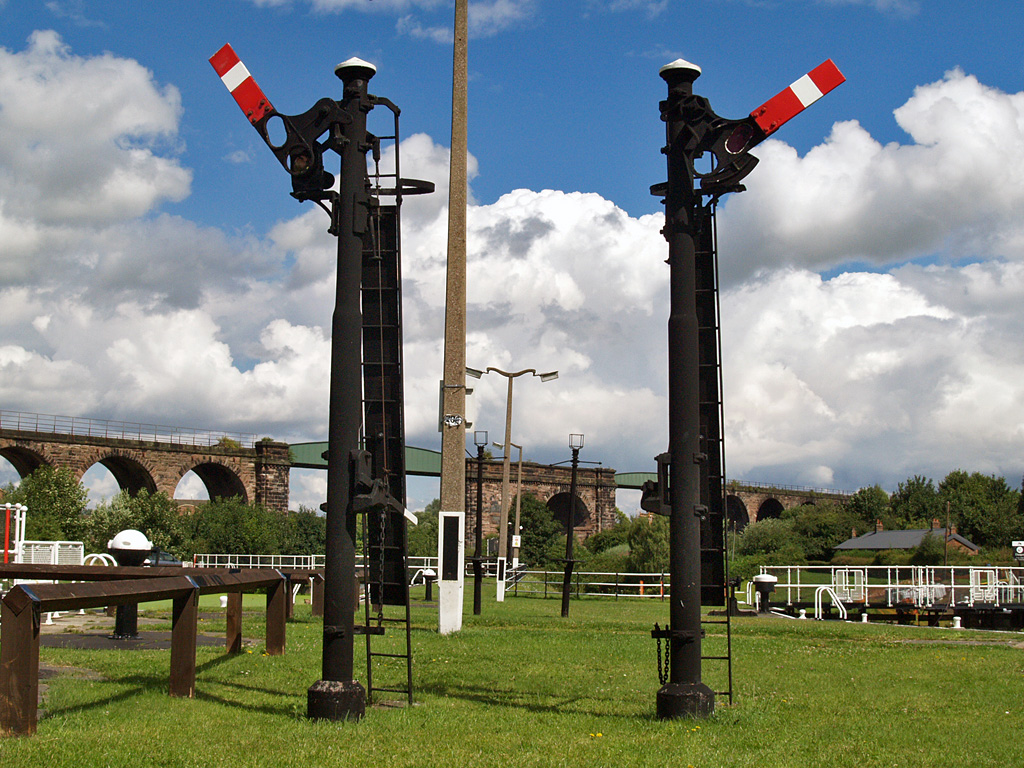
Signals on the River Weaver Navigation, directing boats into the paired locks

Railway-style semaphore signals have been used to control movements of boats or ships (e.g. at swing bridges) and also to control road traffic (e.g. at level crossings).

== Decline in usage ==
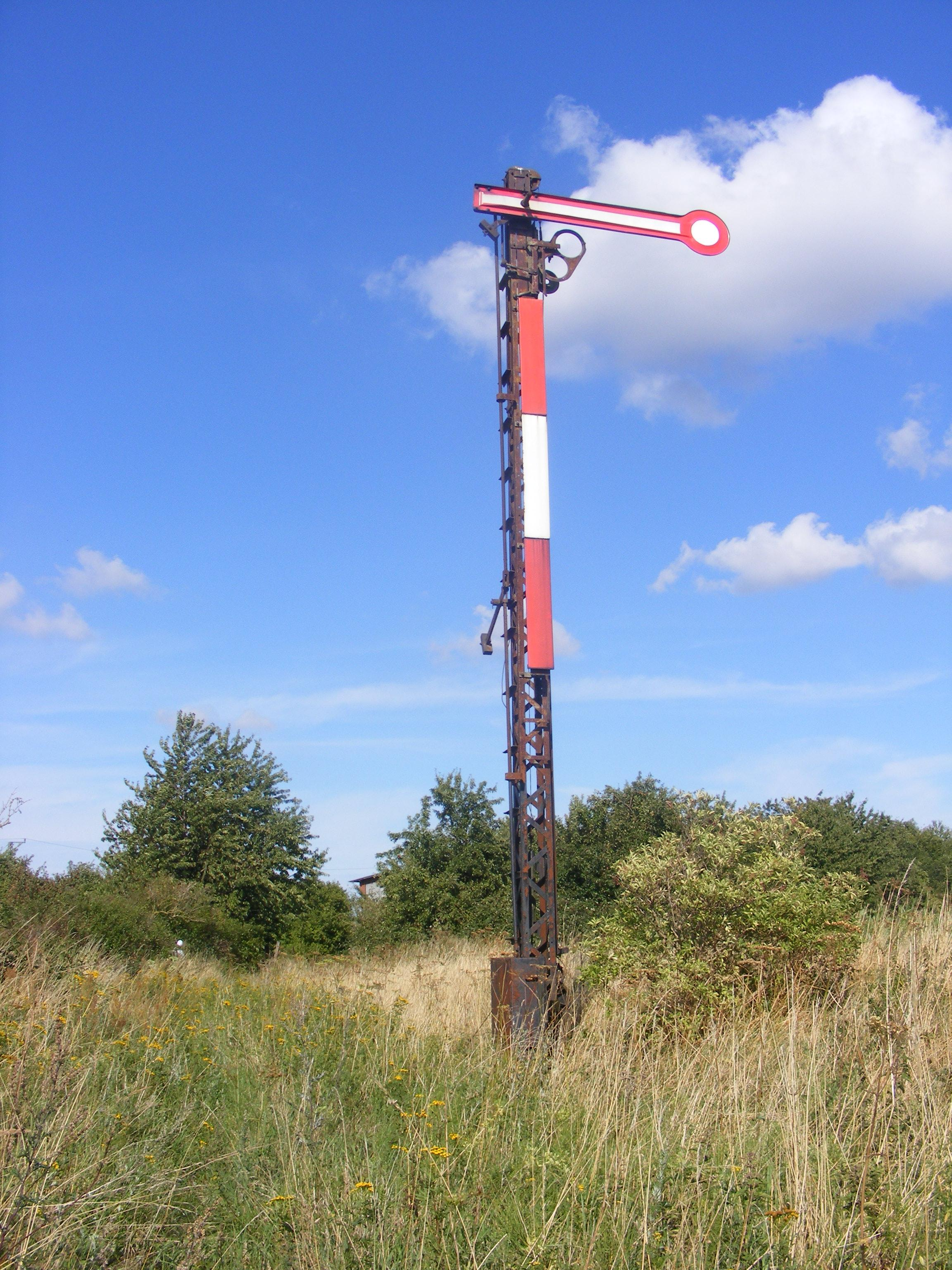
Abandoned German semaphore with missing lenses

Mechanical signals worldwide are being phased out in favour of colour light signals or, in some cases, signalling systems that do not require lineside signals (e.g. ERTMS).

In North America, mechanical signals are almost gone from main lines. As of 2024, the only significant remaining installation was on BNSF Railway's Glorieta Subdivision and Raton Subdivision through Glorieta Pass in New Mexico, which is used by Amtrak's Southwest Chief.

In the UK, semaphore signals are as of 2024 still present on the national network's secondary routes, though increased spending on renewals has led to a faster rate of decline in recent years.

== See also ==
- Signal passed at danger
- Rule 55
- Pass of Brander stone signals
- Semaphore line
