= Ramsey North railway station =

Former railway station in Cambridgeshire, England

Coordinates: 52.4541°N 0.1138°W

Ramsey North
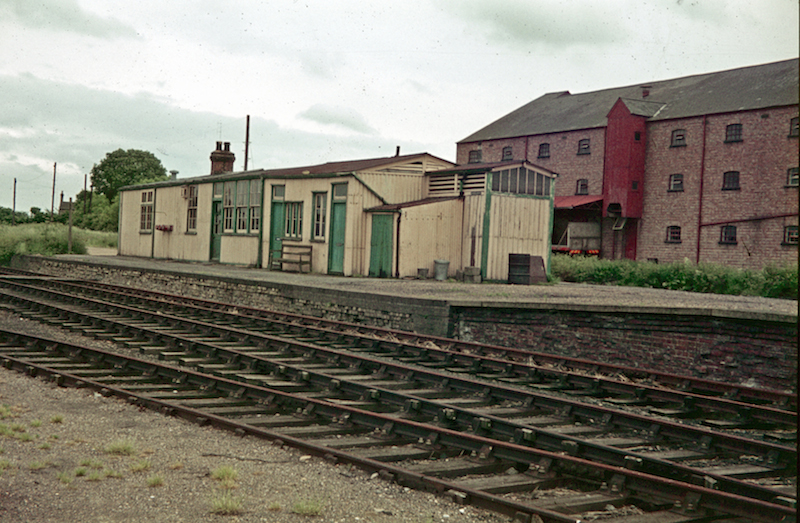
- Ramsey (North) railway station, June 1973

General information
- Location: Ramsey, Huntingdonshire; England
- Grid reference: TL283857
- Platforms: 1

Other information
- Status: Disused

History
- Original company: Ramsey Railway
- Pre-grouping: Great Northern Railway and Great Eastern Railway
- Post-grouping: London and North Eastern Railway

Key dates
- 22 July 1863: Opened as Ramsey
- 1 July 1923: Renamed Ramsey North
- 6 October 1947: Closed for passengers
- December 1973: closed for freight
Location

Ramsey North railway station was a railway station in Ramsey, Cambridgeshire which is now closed. It was the terminus of a branch line from Holme on the East Coast Main Line run by the Great Northern Railway and Great Eastern Railway.

== History ==
Ramsey Railway Act 1861
- Act of Parliament
- Parliament of the United Kingdom
- Long title: An Act to authorize the Construction of a Railway from Holme to Ramsey in the County of Huntingdon.
- Citation: 24 & 25 Vict. c. cxciv

Dates
- Royal assent: 22 July 1861

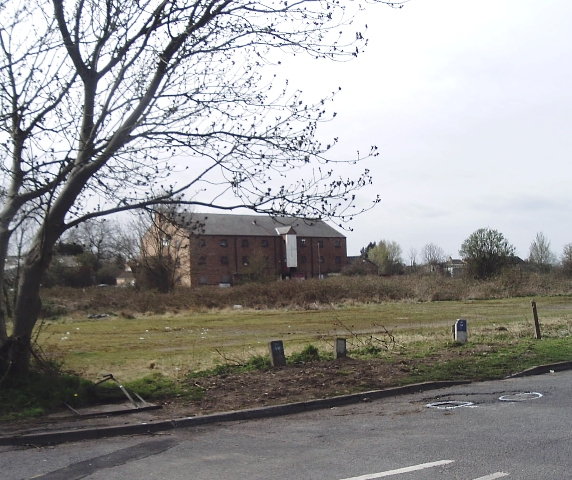
The site of Ramsey (North) railway station

The station opened on 22 July 1863, as the terminus of the Ramsey Railway, a branch line from Holme on the Great Northern Railway (GNR), which had been authorised by the Ramsey Railway Act 1861 (24 & 25 Vict. c. cxciv). The trains were worked by the GNR.

The Ramsey Railway was acquired by the Great Eastern Railway (GER) in 1875, who planned to link it to another line that had been authorised by the Great Eastern Railway (Ramsey Branch) Act 1865 (28 & 29 Vict. c. lxii) to run from Somersham to Ramsey. Although the latter was eventually built, opening in 1889, the two lines were never connected, and the Somersham line terminated at a different station, latterly known as Ramsey East. The branch from Holme remained physically isolated from the rest of the GER system, and so the GER leased it to the GNR which continued to work it.

On 1 January 1923 the GNR and the GER became constituents of the London and North Eastern Railway (LNER), which found itself with two stations in Ramsey; they were given new names on 1 July 1923, the ex-Ramsey Railway station becoming Ramsey North.

The station closed to passengers on 6 October 1947 and to freight in December 1973. Ramsey Auction Rooms now occupy the former site.

== Route ==
Preceding station	Disused railways	Following station
St. Mary's; Line and station closed	Great Northern Railway; Ramsey branch	Terminus
