= Holme railway station (Cambridgeshire) =

Former railway station in Cambridgeshire, England

Coordinates: 52.4744°N 0.2375°W

Holme

General information
- Location: Holme, Huntingdonshire; England
- Grid reference: TL198877
- Platforms: 3

Other information
- Status: Disused

History
- Original company: Great Northern Railway
- Pre-grouping: Great Northern Railway
- Post-grouping: London and North Eastern Railway

Key dates
- 7 August 1850: Opened
- 6 April 1959: Closed
Location

Holme railway station is a former station in Holme, Cambridgeshire.

== History ==
The first section of the Great Northern Railway (GNR) - that from Louth to a junction with the Manchester, Sheffield and Lincolnshire Railway at Grimsby - opened on 1 March 1848, but the southern section of the main line, between Maiden Lane and Peterborough, was not opened until August 1850. Holme was one of the original stations, opening with the line on 7 August 1850.

On 1 August 1863 Holme became a junction station with the opening of the Ramsey Railway, between Holme and Ramsey.

The Ramsey branch closed to passengers on 6 October 1947, and Holme station closed on 6 April 1959.

== Route ==
Preceding station	Historical railways	Following station
Abbots Ripton; Line open, station closed	Great Northern Railway; East Coast Main Line	Yaxley and Farcet; Line open, station closed
	Disused railways	
Terminus	Great Northern Railway; Ramsey branch	St Mary's; Line and station closed
