= Great Northern Railway (Great Britain) =

British railway company, 1846 to 1922

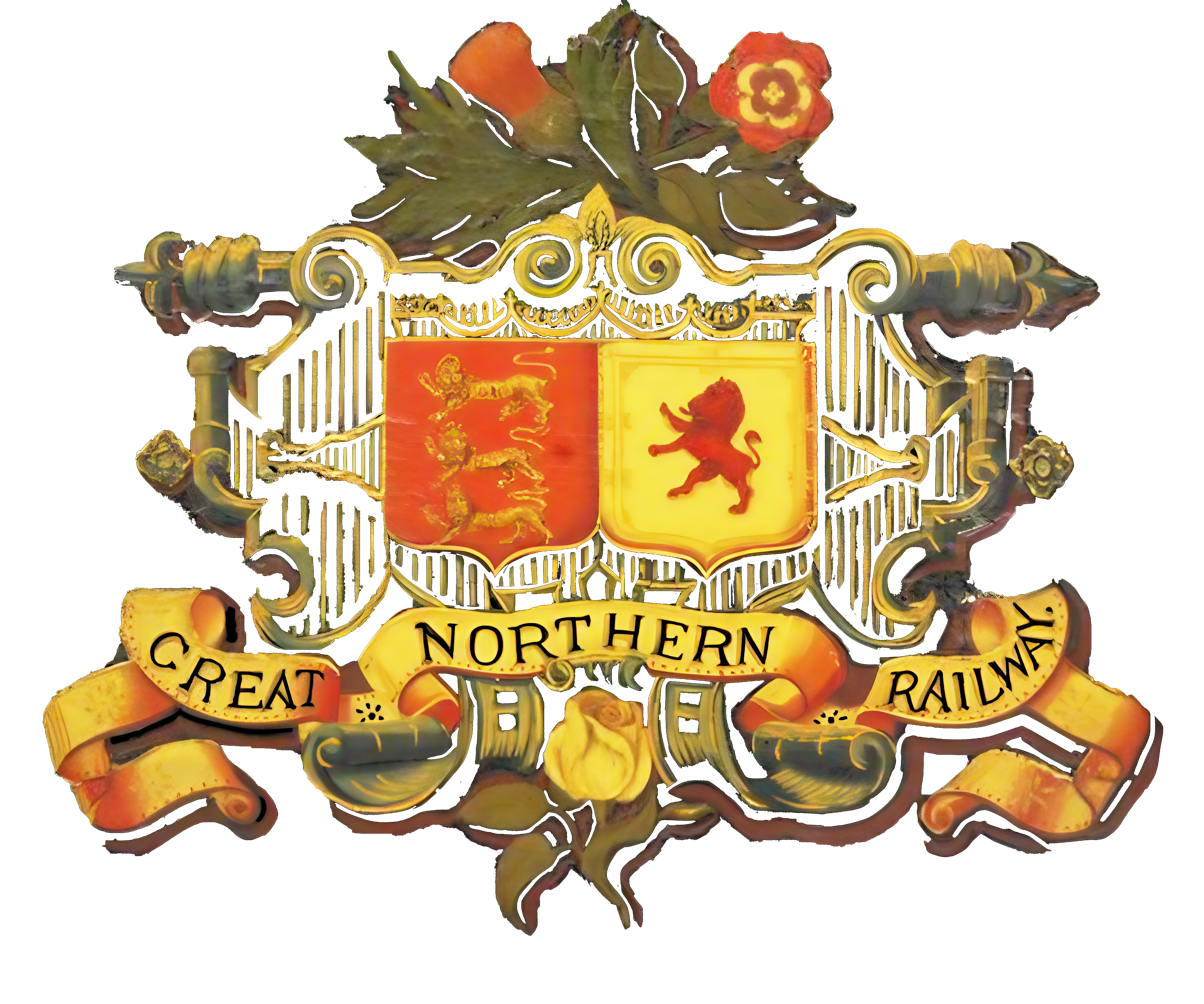

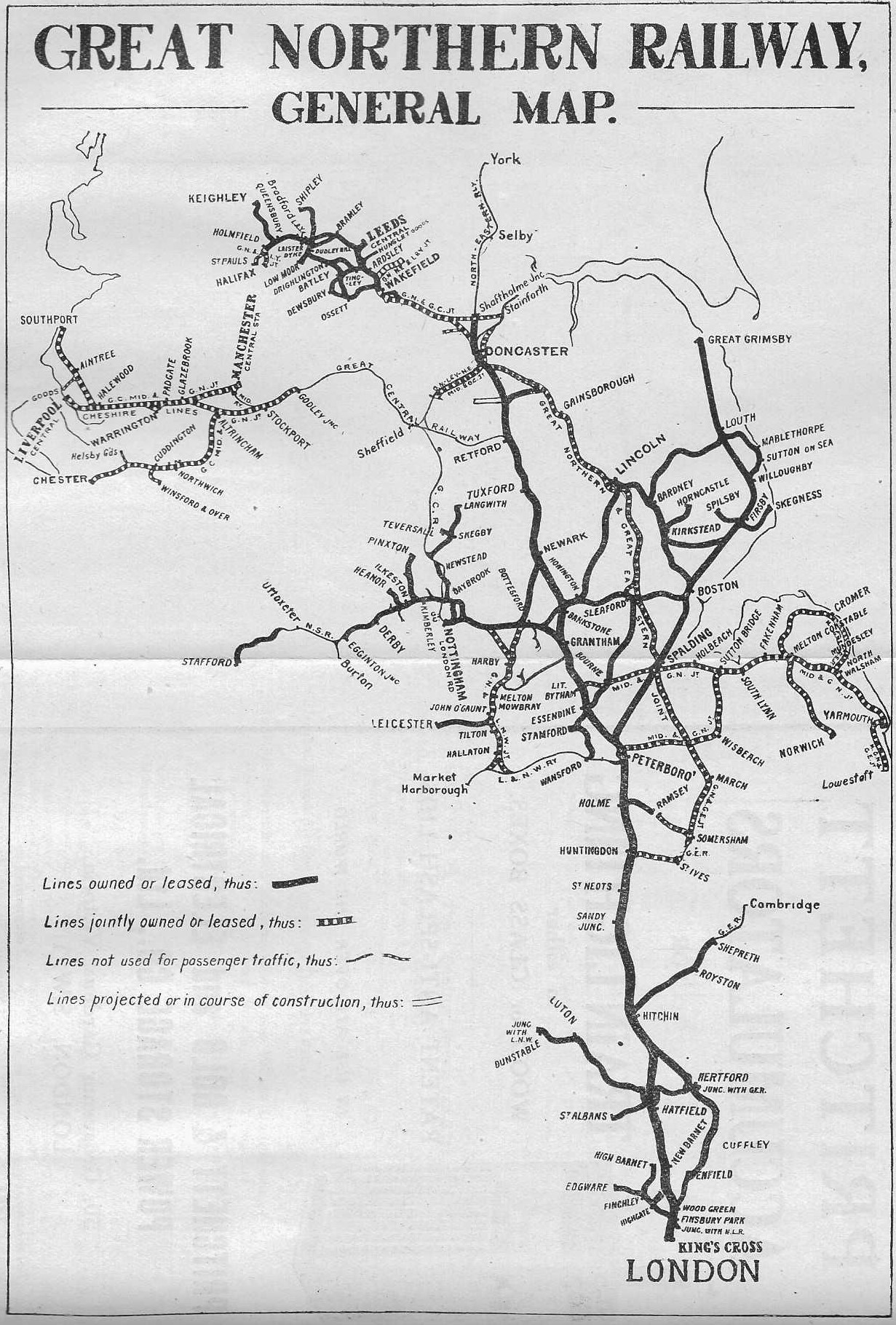
- 1920 map of the railway

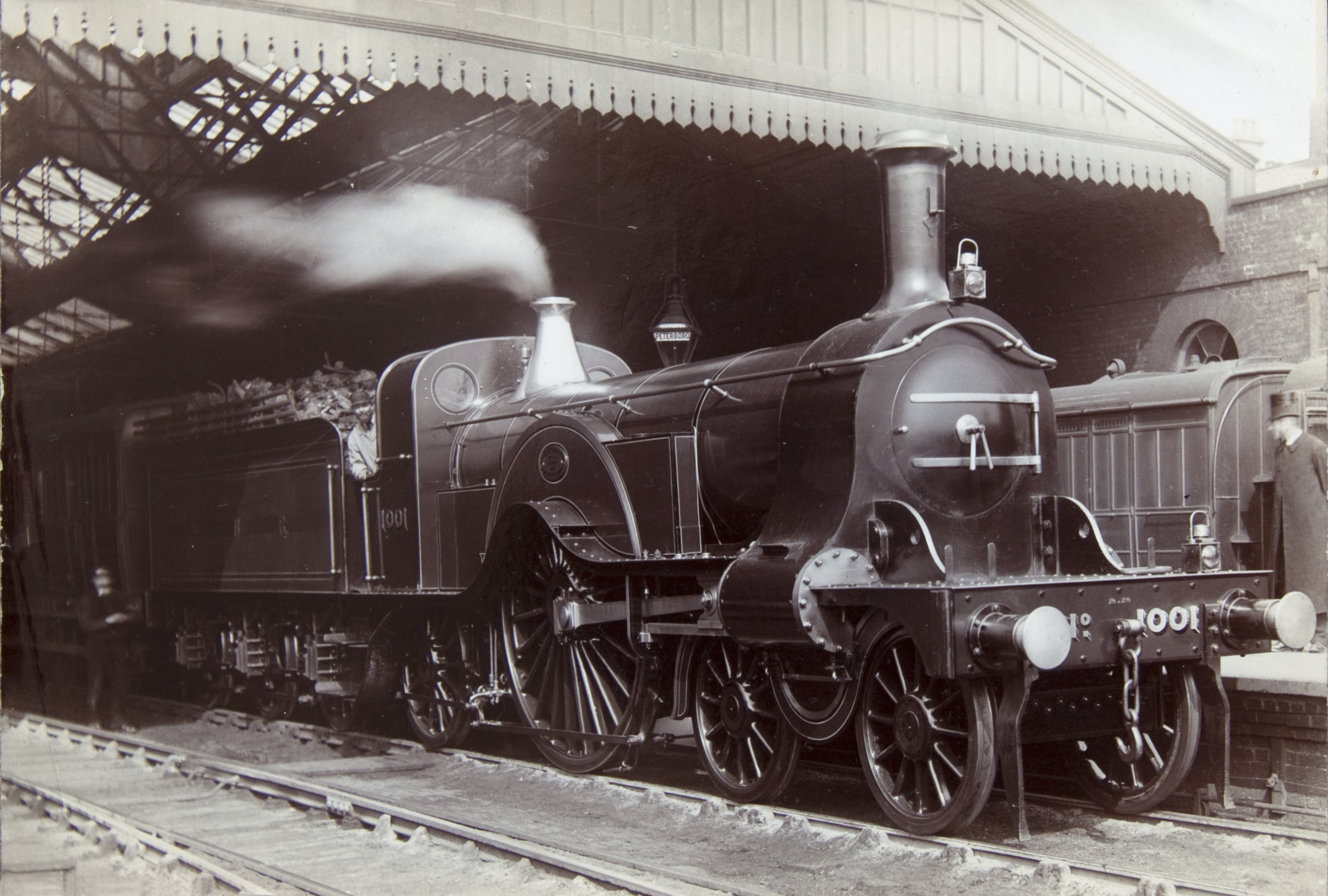
- Great Northern Railway express locomotive (type GNR Stirling 4-2-2).

Overview
- Headquarters: King's Cross
- Locale: England
- Dates of operation: 1848–1922
- Successor: London and North Eastern Railway

Technical
- Track gauge: 4 ft 8 1/2 in (1,435 mm) standard gauge
- Length: 1,053 miles 54 chains (1,695.7 km) (1919)
- Track length: 3,109 miles 45 chains (5,004.4 km) (1919)

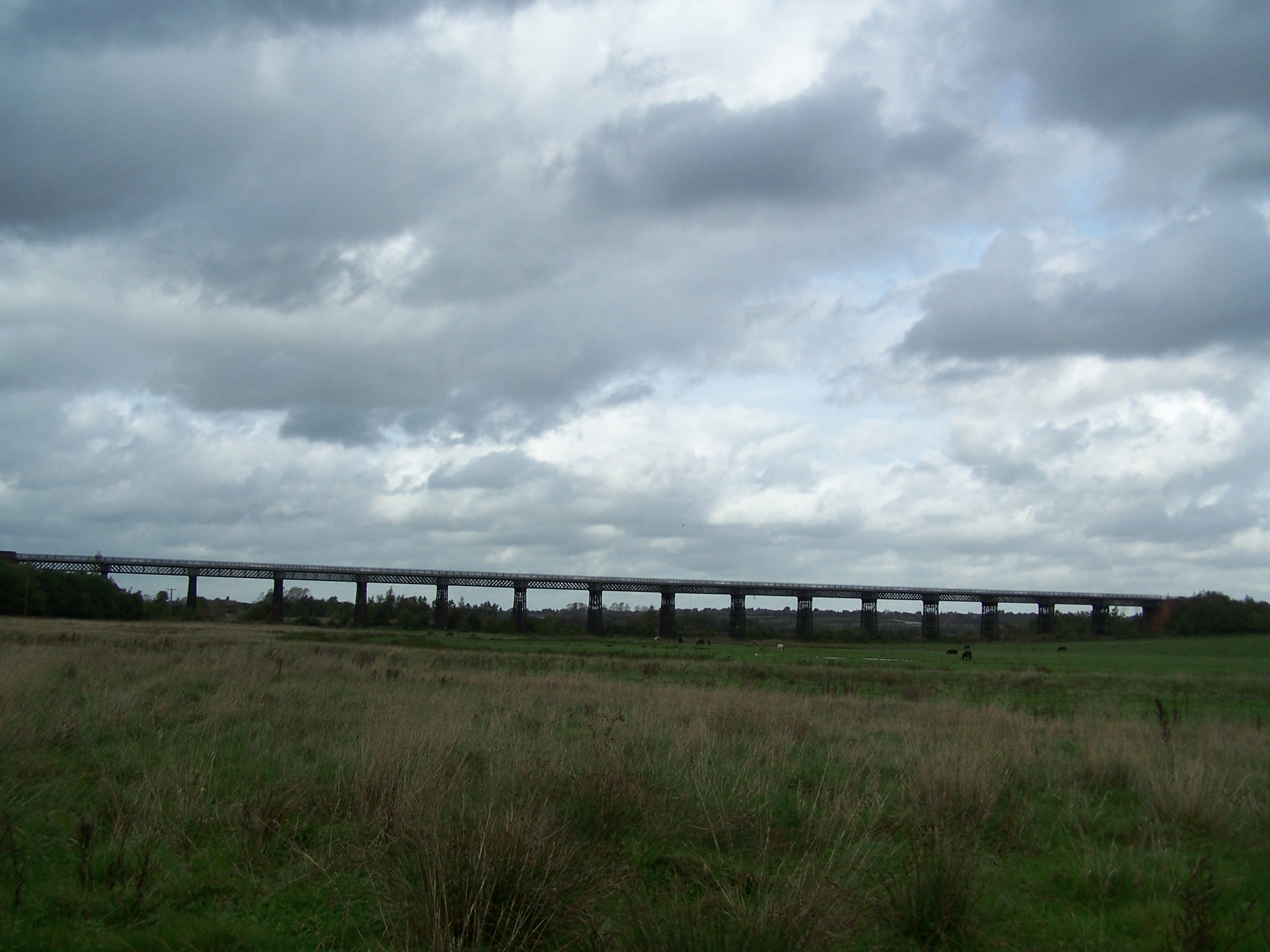
The Bennerley Viaduct on the Awsworth Junction to Derby Branch in 2006

The Great Northern Railway (GNR) was a British railway company incorporated in 1846 with the object of building a line from London to York. It quickly saw that seizing control of territory was key to development, and it acquired, or took leases of, many local railways, whether actually built or not. In so doing, it overextended itself financially.

Nevertheless, it succeeded in reaching into the coalfields of Nottinghamshire, Derbyshire and Yorkshire, as well as establishing dominance in Lincolnshire and north London. Bringing coal south to London was dominant, but general agricultural business, and short- and long-distance passenger traffic, were important activities too. Its fast passenger express trains captured the public imagination, and its Chief Mechanical Engineer Nigel Gresley became a celebrity.

Anglo-Scottish travel on the East Coast Main Line became commercially important; the GNR controlled the line from London to Doncaster and allied itself with the North Eastern Railway and the North British Railway so as to offer seamless travel facilities.

The main line railways of Great Britain were "grouped" following the Railways Act 1921 into one or other of four new larger concerns. The Great Northern Railway was a constituent of the London and North Eastern Railway, which took control at the beginning of 1923. Although many local lines have been closed, much of the network is active today.

== Parliamentary authorisation ==
In 1836, a railway to be called the Great Northern Railway was proposed. It was to run from Whitechapel in east London via Cambridge and Lincoln to York. However, this was a stupendously ambitious project for such an early date, and Parliament turned it down.

By 1844 there was only one trunk railway from London to the north of England: the London and Birmingham Railway was in an uneasy alliance with the Grand Junction Railway, which in turn connected with the North Union Railway which connected to Preston and Fleetwood. Scottish travellers made use of a steamer service from Fleetwood to Ardrossan.

This was the period of the Railway Mania, when myriad schemes, not all of them realistic, were promoted, and anyone could get rich quickly if they were not caught with a failed scheme. At this time George Hudson, a railway financier, was exceptionally skilled in promoting railways and having them built, and most particularly of neutralising or destroying any opposition or competition to his lines. His methods were not always respectable.

Some promoters wanted to build a railway from London to York, and after much negotiation with promoters of other lines that might connect or compete, a London and York Railway was submitted to the 1845 session of Parliament. There were 224 railway bills in that session, and the Board of Trade was instructed to set up a committee to assess groups of proposed lines; the committee became known as the Five Kings. When the London and York Railway scheme came before the parliamentary committees, Hudson set up such a protracted series of objections that the project ran out of parliamentary time in that session.

Great Northern Railway Act 1846
- Act of Parliament
- Parliament of the United Kingdom
- Long title: An Act for making a Railway from London to York, with Branches therefrom providing for the Counties of Hertford, Bedford, Huntingdon, Northampton, Rutland, Nottingham, and the Three Divisions of the County of Lincoln a Railway Communication with London and York, to be called "The Great Northern Railway."
- Citation: 9 & 10 Vict. c. lxxi

Dates
- Royal assent: 26 June 1846

The London and York Railway scheme was submitted to the 1846 session of Parliament; some other schemes for railways to the north had by now fallen by the wayside, and their supporters joined the London and York project; reflecting that, the proposed company name was altered to the Great Northern Railway. George Hudson continued to use his dubious methods to frustrate the scheme, but on 26 June the Great Northern Railway Act 1846 (9 & 10 Vict. c. lxxi) was given royal assent. Numerous branches earlier proposed had been deleted, but the main line was approved. Authorised capital was £5.6 million. The company had spent £590,355 on parliamentary expenses.

The authorised line was from London ("Pentonville") via Huntingdon, Peterborough, Grantham, Retford, Doncaster and Selby to a junction with the Great North of England Railway, just south of York Station. Also included in the act was a loop from Werrington Junction, north of Peterborough, via Spalding to Boston, Lincoln to Gainsborough and back on to the main line at Bawtry.

Land acquisition proved to be difficult; in particular, the King's Cross site was occupied by a smallpox hospital. The freeholder demanded an impossibly large price to vacate, and the matter had to go before a jury. This, and the subsequent removal of the hospital to new premises, would incur a huge delay. The GNR board decided to make a temporary London terminal at Maiden Lane.

Stamford and Spalding Railway Act 1846
- Act of Parliament
- Parliament of the United Kingdom
- Long title: An Act for making a Railway from the intended Great Northern Railway in the Parish of Ufford in the County of Northampton, to unite with the Loop Line of the same Railway in the Parish of Crowland in Lincolnshire.
- Citation: 9 & 10 Vict. c. ccclii

Dates
- Royal assent: 7 August 1846

Text of statute as originally enacted

The company undertook some extraordinary commitments at this time. It arranged to purchase the Stamford and Spalding Railway; this would form a loop from north of Peterborough back on to the GNR Loop Line near Crowland; and lease at 6% of the Royston and Hitchin Railway, the East Lincolnshire Railway (Boston to Great Grimsby; both authorised, but neither yet built) and the Boston, Stamford and Birmingham Railway (never built). It also took about a third-of-a-million-pounds-worth of shares in the South Yorkshire Railway.

== Getting started ==
1846 was a peak year for railway scheme authorisations, fuelled by the feverish hunt for quick riches in railway shares. The bubble burst the following year when the Panic of 1847 made it almost impossible to get investment money, especially for railway projects already authorised.

The Great Northern Railway directors had a dauntingly large railway network to build, and they had to prioritise the parts of their authorised network which they would start to construct. In the second half of 1847, the directors,

owing to the state of the Money Market... decided to abstain from letting the works from Doncaster to York. But at the end of July a further small contract was let to Messrs. Peto & Betts for the works from ... Doncaster, northwards to Askern, with the object of forming an "end-on" junction there with the branch of the Lancashire and Yorkshire Company, over which... the Great Northern had just obtained power to run its trains to Wakefield and to Methley on the way to Leeds. (Note: Askern is frequently referred to in source material. It is a small town about two miles north west of Shaftholme Junction, which is normally taken as the connecting point of the GNR, the York and Newcastle Railway (later the North Eastern Railway) and the Lancashire and Yorkshire Railway Knottingley line. It appears that "Askern" is used to refer to the intended junction, which was in a remote and as yet nameless location. See Wrottesley, volume I, p. 17; Grinling, p. 66; Tomlinson, p. 502; and Great Northern News (periodical of the Great Northern Railway Society), ISSN 2399-6625, March–April 2019, p. 224.09)

The directors decided to build the Loop Line first, as that was the easiest to complete in order to start earning income.

== Construction ==
The first portion of the Great Northern Railway was opened on 1 March 1848. It was actually on the leased East Lincolnshire Railway line, from Great Grimsby to Louth. Five trains ran each way every weekday, and on from Grimsby to New Holland on the River Humber, by alliance with the Manchester, Sheffield and Lincolnshire Railway. This was followed by the opening from Louth to Firsby on 3 September 1848. On 2 October 1848, the line was opened from Firsby to a temporary station at Boston.

The GNR opened a section of its own line from Stockbridge (Note: Stockbridge was about halfway between Doncaster and the later Shaftholme Junction; it was renamed Arksey station shortly afterwards.) and Askern, and the Lancashire and Yorkshire Railway opened from Knottingley. There was a formal opening on 5 June 1848 and a public opening two days later; (Note: The L&YR section opened fully on 6 June and the GNR section on 7 June.) at that stage the L&YR operated the passenger trains. On 5 August 1848 the GNR section was extended south to a temporary Doncaster station, and a goods service was operated.

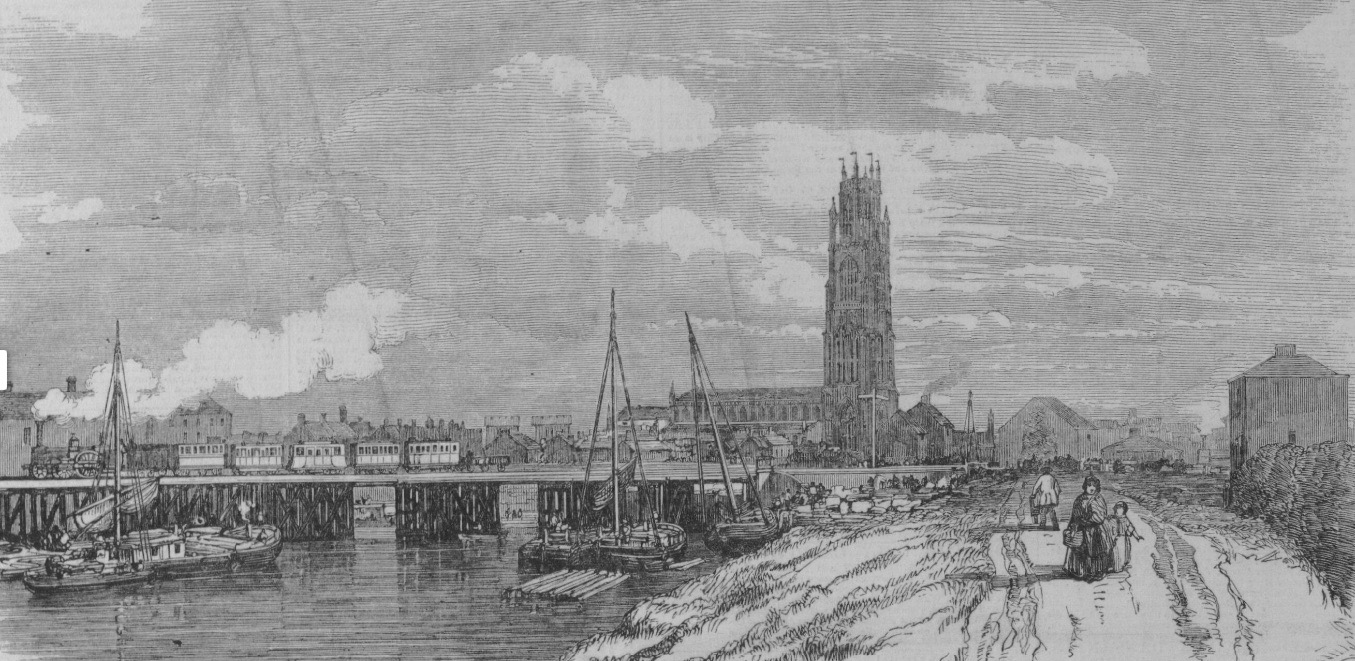
The line at Boston from the Illustrated London News 28 October 1848

Part of the Loop Line was soon ready, and 58 miles from Walton Junction (near Peterborough, on the newly opened Midland Railway) to Lincoln opened on 17 October 1848. The line was double except for a mile at Boston, which was made double track by a deviation on 11 May 1850.

Captain Wynne viewed the line from Lincoln to Gainsborough on 29 March 1849, but refused permission to open until signals were provided at the swing bridge at Brayford Mere (Lincoln); the line opened on 9 April 1849 when they had been provided. The route made a junction with the Manchester, Sheffield and Lincolnshire Railway at Gainsborough; GNR trains reversed at the junction and used the MS&LR station at Gainsborough. A junction was made with the MS&LR line at Durham Ox Junction, Lincoln, some time after 3 April 1848, and sanctioned by Parliament retrospectively.

The direct line between Peterborough and Doncaster was known as the Towns Line. The first part of it was opened between the MS&LR station at Retford and Doncaster on 4 September 1849. A proper station at Doncaster was built and ready by the middle of 1851.

By this means, the GNR was able to start a service between London and Leeds using running powers and agreements over other lines in a roundabout routing northward from Retford; George Hudson tried to repudiate his earlier undertaking to permit this, but at this time his disgraceful methods had come to light, and he had resigned from the Midland Railway and several other boards; the train service started on 1 October 1848.

The York and North Midland Railway was urging the GNR to use the Y&NMR line from Knottingley to York, shortly to be opened, and to abandon the GNR's plans for its own line to York. After considerable deliberation, the GNR agreed to this on 6 June 1850.

By arrangement with the MS&LR the GNR started running trains between Lincoln and Sheffield on 7 August 1850; the trains were routed over the MS&LR from Sykes Junction, a few miles north of Lincoln.

== London opening at last ==
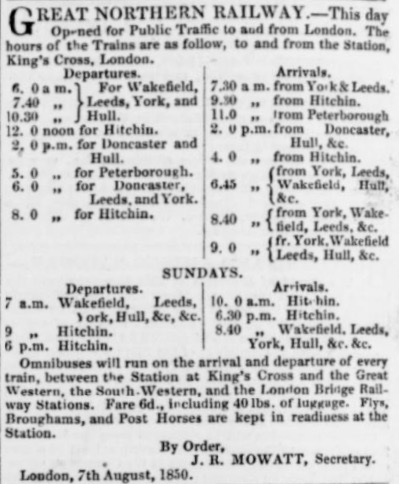
Timetable from the Railway Times Saturday 10 August 1850

The London (Maiden Lane) to Peterborough line was ready for a demonstration opening run on 5 August 1850, and it was opened to the public on 7 August 1850; eight passenger trains were run each way daily, with three on Sundays. On 8 August 1850 trains started running through from London to York. The Maiden Lane terminal was referred to by the company as "King's Cross". A through train to Edinburgh was run from 2 September 1850; the train ran via Peterborough, Boston, Lincoln, Retford, Doncaster, Knottingley, Milford Junction and York, thence by the York, Newcastle and Berwick Railway (not yet open on a direct route).

Goods traffic started on the main line from 12 December 1850, and the Hitchin to Royston line was opened on 21 October 1850; this was extended to Shepreth on 3 August 1851. Captain Mark Huish had been appointed General Manager of the London and North Western Railway on its formation in 1846. Huish was a skilful railway diplomat, and while his methods were generally more proper than Hudson's, they were aggressive in finding means of disadvantaging competitors, such as the GNR.

From the outset the Great Northern Railway had been anxious to acquire local railways or at least make arrangements with them, in order to expand the company's territory. In 1852 the shareholders expressed their displeasure at the volume of financial commitments implied by these, but the Chairman Edmund Denison continued his policy, without showing his hand.

== Opening of the Towns Line ==
The company had prioritised construction of the Loop Line via Lincoln at the expense of the so-called Towns Line, the direct line from Peterborough to Doncaster. When this work was pressed forward, a number of difficulties presented themselves, including failure of a contractor. However, the line opened for passengers on 1 August 1851, and for goods traffic on 15 July 1852. The Towns Line ran from Werrington Junction north of Peterborough to Retford, where the MS&LR connected by a spur, known as the Lincoln Curve. There were flat crossings at Newark with the Midland Railway and at Retford with the MS&LR main line. A south to west curve was laid in at Retford, enabling a GNR service to Sheffield.

== Reaching Nottingham ==
The Ambergate, Nottingham, Boston and Eastern Junction Railway had been formed to connect the manufacturing districts of Manchester with the port of Boston, and had opened in 1850 between Colwick Junction, near Nottingham, and a temporary station at Grantham. It now connected into the GNR at Grantham, opening the connection on 2 August 1852; it was worked by the GNR. The Ambergate company relied on running powers into the Midland Railway station at Nottingham, but there were considerable disputes about the matter for many years, and the GNR had difficulty in getting access.

To resolve the situation the Ambergate company built its own line into a separate terminal at London Road, Nottingham. This opened on 3 October 1857. The GNR leased the Ambergate company from 1 August 1861.

== King's Cross station ==
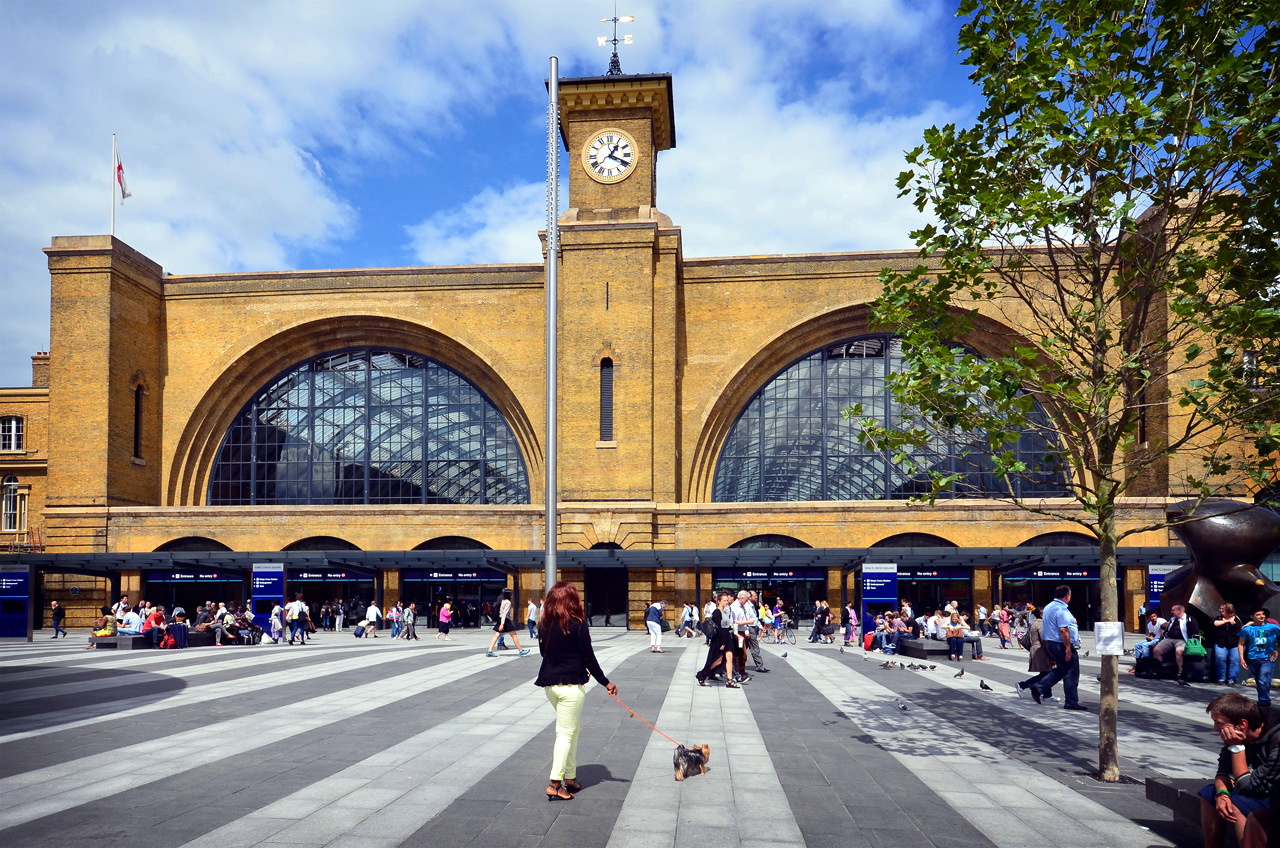
King's Cross station, 2014

On 14 October 1852 King's Cross station was at last brought into use, and the Maiden Lane temporary station was closed. King's Cross had two large sheds, familiar to the present day, but only two passenger platforms, the later platforms 1 and 8. The intervening space was occupied by carriage sidings.

== Completion of the first phase ==
At the end of 1852 it was considered that the company had achieved its objectives as originally conceived, with the line opened from King's Cross over both the Towns Line and the Loop, into Yorkshire. Four passenger trains ran from Kings Cross to York, one of them first class only and one parliamentary train. (Note: By law, nearly all railway companies had to run at least one train a day calling at all stations, at a fare of one penny a mile. These were referred to as parliamentary trains.)

The directors of the company continued to seek to consolidate occupation of territory, without necessarily building new lines. The capitalisation of the company was already considerable, and a further million of money was authorised by the Great Northern Railway (Increase of Capital) Act 1853 (16 & 17 Vict. c. lx). Another demand on financial resources was willingly undertaken: the installation of the electric telegraph, at first at the southern end of the system. It was soon used for signalling trains through the tunnel sections, and by 1856 it was used throughout as far north as Hitchin.

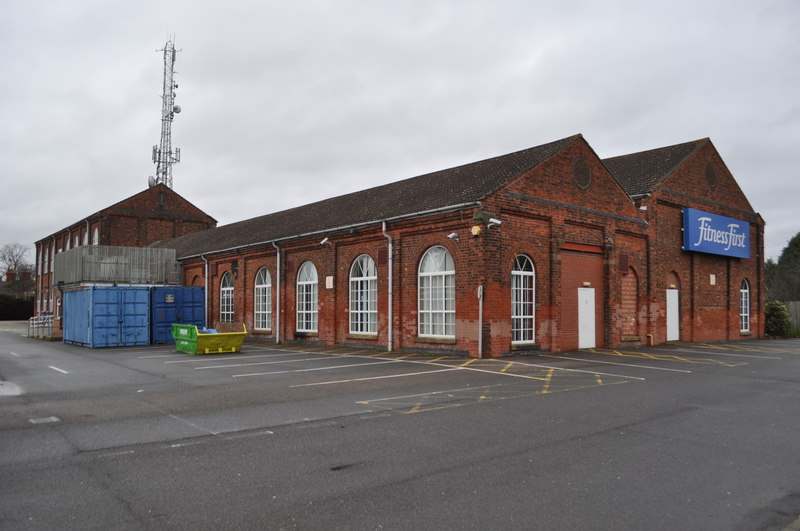
The former GNR works at Boston, Lincolnshire

Reflecting the anticipated focus of operations, the GNR opened a new locomotive works at Doncaster in 1853, replacing earlier facilities at Boston.

== Into Yorkshire ==
=== York main line ===
The authorised network of the GNR had included the line from Doncaster to York. The Lancashire and Yorkshire Railway (L&YR) was building from Knottingley to a junction at Askern, near the present-day Shaftholme Junction north of Doncaster, and mutual running powers had been agreed. The line was opened to the public on 6 June 1848, between Knottingley and Askern. This was extended on 7 June 1848 over the GNR to Stockbridge, a place on the Bentley Road between Askern and Doncaster. The GNR stretch amounted to 2 miles 45 chains. Stockbridge was later renamed Arksey. The GNR further extended southwards to a temporary station immediately north of the River Don at Doncaster; it opened on the following 5 August in time for the St Leger race meeting.

=== West Yorkshire ===
It was a priority for the GNR to get access to the great manufacturing towns of West Yorkshire, to which it had been denied its own connection in Parliament. Leeds was the first to be reached.

A Central station at Leeds was authorised on 22 July 1848. It was joint with three other companies, (Note: The others were the Lancashire and Yorkshire Railway, the London and North Western Railway, and the North Eastern Railway.) and GNR trains first reached it on 1 October 1848. GNR trains ran from Doncaster to Leeds over the Lancashire and Yorkshire Railway (L&YR) between Askern Junction and Methley, and over the Midland Railway between Methley and Leeds. On reaching Leeds the trains ran forward onto the Leeds and Thirsk Railway, and then reversed into the central station at Leeds.

The South Yorkshire, Doncaster and Goole Railway opened its line from Doncaster to Barnsley on 1 January 1851. The GNR had running powers over the line, and started running passenger trains to Barnsley, and mineral trains to and from Horbury.

On 1 August 1854, the independent Leeds, Bradford and Halifax Junction Railway (LB&HJR) opened its line between Leeds and Bowling Junction, close to Bradford, where it made a connection with the L&YR. The LB&HJR had running powers over the L&YR to Halifax, and the GNR were granted running powers over this line, so the GNR got access to Bradford and Halifax.

Another independent railway, the Bradford, Wakefield and Leeds Railway (BW&LR) opened its line between Wakefield (the present-day Kirkgate station) and junctions near Leeds, on 3 October 1857. The GNR and the L&YR had running powers over the new line, and this enabled the Great Northern Railway Company to route its Doncaster to Leeds trains by this route, using the L&YR from Askern to Wakefield. The junctions near Leeds were with the LB&HJR at Wortley, forming a triangle and enabling through running towards either Leeds or Bradford. This development allowed the GNR to avoid using the hostile Midland Railway track at all, and allowed a direct entry to Leeds Central station, avoiding the awkward reversal on the Thirsk line.

A week after the opening of the BW&LR, on 10 October 1857, the LB&HJR opened a direct line from Ardsley on the BW&LR to Laisterdyke, near Bradford. This was an extension of its Gildersome mineral line; although steeply graded this formed an additional through route for GNR trains.

Both the LB&HJR and the BW&LR constructed (or obtained approval to construct) some branches within their area of influence. There were branches to Batley, opened by each company separately in 1864. Perhaps more significant was the decision to connect to the L&YR station at Bradford (later Bradford Exchange). The LB&HJR station was a terminus, called Adolphus Street, and the connection towards Halifax by-passed it. A new curve was built of that connecting line to allow trains to enter the L&YR terminus; this started on 7 January 1867. Train movements at the throat of the L&YR station were frequent, and congestion became a problem.

The BW&LR changed its title to the West Yorkshire Railway by the West Yorkshire Railway Act 1863 (26 & 27 Vict. c. clxvii), and in that same year both it and the LB&HJR agreed to be absorbed by the GNR; this was authorised by the Great Northern and West Yorkshire Railways Amalgamation Act 1865 (28 & 29 Vict. c. cccxxxi).

The GNR was therefore able to consolidate a substantial network in West Yorkshire, bringing Wakefield, Leeds, Bradford and Halifax into its area of influence. However, trains from Doncaster still had to rely on running powers over the Lancashire and Yorkshire Railway between Askern Junction and Wakefield. The solution was on the horizon, when the West Riding and Grimsby Railway opened its line between Wakefield and Doncaster. It was to make an eastward branch to Thorne, justifying the Grimsby reference in its title. It opened its line on 1 February 1866 and on the same day the hitherto independent concern became the joint property of the GNR and the Manchester, Sheffield and Lincolnshire Railway. Now at last the GNR had the line it sought.

=== Sheffield ===
On 1 January 1847 the Manchester, Sheffield and Lincolnshire Railway (MS&LR) came into existence by the merger of some smaller lines. The GNR had been granted running powers from Retford to Sheffield and in 1850 it informed the MS&LR that it was to run passenger trains from Lincoln from 7 August 1849. The GNR was not made welcome at Sheffield, but a change of policy from 1856 brought some changes. In particular from 1 August 1857 the GNR "Manchester fliers" started running. They were worked by GNR locomotives through to Sheffield, and covered the 203 miles (325 km) from King's Cross to Manchester London Road via Sheffield in 5hr 20min, soon to be cut to an even five hours. Until February 1859 the GNR paid £1,500 per annum for the use of Victoria, but then made an outright payment of £25,000 to secure permanent half-rights to the station.

From 1859 GNR trains also ran to Huddersfield via Sheffield and Penistone.

=== Halifax and the Queensbury lines ===
From 1866 the Great Northern Railway had the control it wanted in West Yorkshire. A number of additional branches were built; perhaps the most important was the Dewsbury branch. A Dewsbury terminus opened in 1874, but this was followed by a through line to Batley via a new Dewsbury through station, opened in 1880.

From 1867, the GNR launched into an expensive and ultimately unremunerative entry into the hilly terrain west of Bradford and north of Halifax. This started with the Halifax and Ovenden Junction Railway, a short line in the northern heights of Halifax, opened in 1874, jointly with the L&YR. This was followed by the Bradford and Thornton Railway and the associated Halifax, Thornton and Keighley Railway. These were built by the GNR at huge expense, with daunting engineering features. They opened progressively from 1876 to 1884.

=== Pudsey ===
A loop line through Pudsey from Bramley to Laisterdyke was created, opening in 1893, as an extension of an earlier dead end line.

== Lincolnshire ==
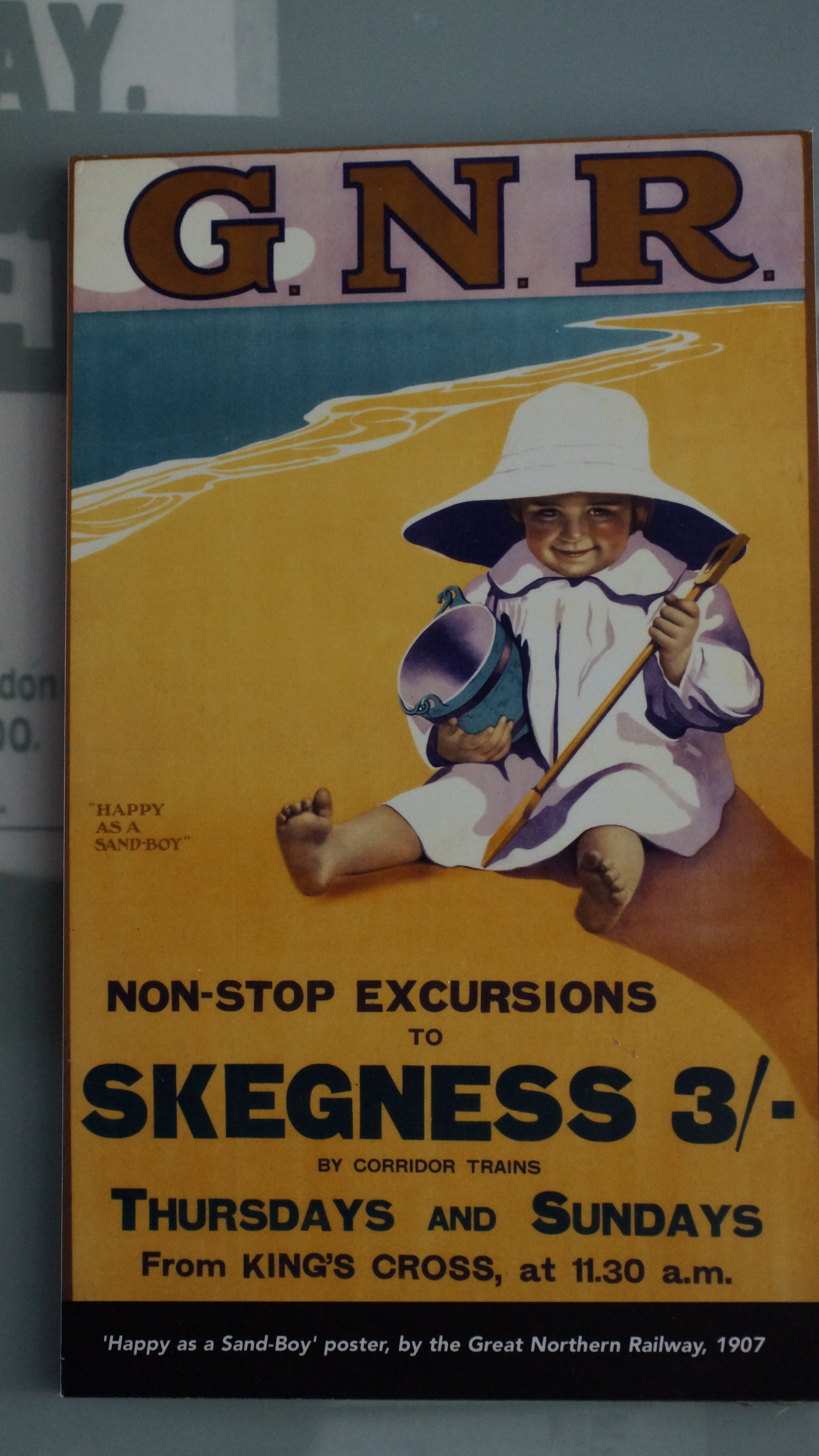
Happy as a Sand-Boy, summer specials poster to Skegness (1907)

In 1848 the East Lincolnshire Line (leased from the East Lincolnshire Railway) was opened, as was the Great Northern Railway's own route from Peterborough (Werrington Junction) via Spalding and Boston to Lincoln. The GNR had decided not to build the authorised line from Lincoln to Bawtry, for its intended Bawtry-to-Sheffield branch had been cut out of the authorising act. The GNR extended to Gainsborough, but was unable for some years to get authorisation for a different approach to Doncaster from there to Rossington. In the meantime, the GNR used the MS&LR line from Gainsborough to Retford.

The Boston, Sleaford and Midland Counties Railway opened from near Grantham to Sleaford in June 1857, and on to Boston in April 1859. The GNR acquired that company in 1864, and that completed a through west-to-east route from Nottingham to Boston.

For some years the GNR avoided building numerous branch lines within the territory it had secured in Lincolnshire, but a series of independent branches were built, and many of these turned to the GNR for financial help. Most notable among these were the seaside branches, of Skegness (opened in 1873), Mablethorpe (1877) and Sutton on Sea (1886). These resorts generated very considerable traffic, much of it day-trip traffic from the Midlands industrial towns.

In later years, the GNR itself built some branch lines. In many cases these were built through sparsely populated agricultural terrain, and little commercial development followed. The large Lincolnshire towns of Louth, Boston and Lincoln also failed to develop greatly.

The Lincolnshire lines in general declined steadily from the 1930s onwards, and the process culminated in a major closure programme in 1970, after which only the Nottingham - Grantham - Boston - Skegness line and the Great Northern and Great Eastern Joint Line between Spalding and Doncaster via Lincoln (together with the GNR Peterborough to Spalding line) remained open among the GNR routes.

== Hertfordshire branches ==
In the same parliamentary session as the authorisation of the Great Northern Railway itself, the Royston and Hitchin Railway (R&HR) was authorised by the Royston and Hitchin Railway Act 1846 (9 & 10 Vict. c. clxx). The GNR encouraged it, hoping it would provide a springboard for a connection to Cambridge. The R&HR opened in 1850, continuing to Shepreth in 1851. The Eastern Counties Railway (ECR) opened a line from a junction near Cambridge to Shepreth in 1852, and the line from Hitchin to Cambridge was worked on a lease basis as a single entity.

The R&HR was acquired by the GNR in 1897, but the Cambridge end of the line, from Shepreth, remained in Great Eastern Railway (as successor to the ECR) hands until the Grouping of 1923. The line was electrified throughout in 1987 and forms an important passenger corridor.

The Hertford and Welwyn Junction Railway opened in 1858; it was operated jointly by the GNR and the Eastern Counties Railway. It gave access to the London docks over the Eastern Counties line. This developed into the formation of the Hertford, Luton and Dunstable Railway of 1860, which connected with the GNR at Hatfield, and the company was acquired by the GNR in 1861.

The London and North Western Railway opened a branch line from Watford to St Albans in 1858. Independent promoters supported by the GNR obtained powers to make a branch from Hatfield to the LNWR station; it opened in 1865, worked by the GNR, which absorbed the St Albans company in 1883.

== Midland Railway at Hitchin ==
George Hudson's Midland Railway was progressing south from its original base in Derby; for tactical reasons it proposed to reach London over the GNR from Hitchin, by building a line from Leicester via Bedford. This opened in 1857 and through passenger trains from the Midland Railway system to King's Cross started on 1 February 1858.

The Midland Railway later built its own line from Leicester to St Pancras, opening in 1867 (goods) and 1868; from that time the line between Bedford and Hitchin became a branch line of the MR.

== Cheshire Lines Committee ==
In 1863 the Great Northern Railway made an agreement with the Manchester, Sheffield and Lincolnshire Railway regarding the joint management of four railways in Cheshire; this was ratified by the Great Northern Railway (Cheshire Lines) Act 1863 (26 & 27 Vict. c. cxlvii) of 13 July. This was followed by joint construction in Liverpool and Manchester, and later Chester. The GNR had access to the Cheshire Lines over the MS&LR from Retford. The Midland Railway later joined the partnership, and the Cheshire Lines Committee continued as a management entity until nationalisation at the end of 1947.

== East Coast collaboration ==
The GNR's role in the establishment of an Anglo-Scottish East Coast route was confirmed by establishment of the East Coast Joint Stock in 1860, whereby a common pool of passenger vehicles was operated by the GNR, the North Eastern Railway and the North British Railway. The main express trains were the 10am departures from King's Cross and Edinburgh, which began running in June 1862. By the 1870s these trains were known as the Flying Scotsman.

== City Widened Lines ==
On 1 October 1863, the GNR began a shuttle service from King's Cross to Farringdon Street via the City Widened Lines, but through suburban services did not use this line until 1 March 1868, and then were extended to Moorgate Street on 1 June 1869.

== Midland and Great Northern Joint Railway ==
On 1 August 1866, the GNR made an agreement with the Midland to jointly work the Eastern & Midland Railway, comprising a line from Bourne to King's Lynn via Spalding. The GNR gave the Midland running powers from Stamford to Bourne via Essendine in return for the Midland dropping a proposed line from Saxby to Bourne.

The main line of the Midland and Great Northern Joint Railway ran from Peterborough to Great Yarmouth via South Lynn (with running powers to King's Lynn) and Melton Constable. Branches ran from Sutton Bridge to the Midland Railway near Little Bytham, from Melton Constable to Cromer, and from Melton Constable to Norwich.

In addition, the Norfolk and Suffolk Joint Railway was a joint line owned by the M&GNR and the Great Eastern Railway. This ran between Cromer and North Walsham and between Great Yarmouth and Lowestoft.

== Highgate lines in North London ==
The Edgware, Highgate and London Railway was authorised independently in 1862 to build a suburban line from Seven Sisters Road (renamed Finsbury Park in 1869) to Highgate and Edgware. Before opening, branches to Muswell Hill and High Barnet were authorised too. The Edgware main line was opened on 22 August 1867, by which time the GNR had taken over the company. The High Barnet branch opened in 1872, and greater population growth caused it to become the main line. The dominant business was residential travel, and the southern terminals used included Blackfriars, Loughborough Road, and later Moorgate and Broad Street.

The Muswell Hill Estate and Railways Act 1866 (29 & 30 Vict. c. ccxc) of 30 July authorised the Muswell Hill and Palace Railway from near Highgate station to Alexandra Palace; it opened on 24 May 1873, the same day as Alexandra Palace itself. On 9 June 1873 the Alexandra Palace was totally destroyed by fire. The Muswell Hill and Palace Railway was taken over by the GNR in 1911.

The Highgate lines became overwhelmed with passenger business, which encouraged the development of the Underground (urban rapid transit) network, and the Edgware trains were diverted to what became the Northern line of the London Passenger Transport Board.

Passenger services between Edgware and Finchley Central were terminated at the outbreak of the Second World War, and the majority of the residual passenger services were transferred to the London Underground network. In 1954 the Alexandra Palace line discontinued passenger operation. Some special train movements continued on the Highgate line until 1970.

== Profitability and investment ==
The GNR was most profitable in 1873, running a more intensive service of express trains than either the LNWR or the MR. Hauled by Patrick Stirling's single-driving-wheel locomotives, its trains were some of the fastest in the world.

However, in 1875, the increase in revenue was outpaced by investment, which included items such as block signalling systems and interlocking, and improvements to stations and goods sidings.

== Derbyshire and Staffordshire ==
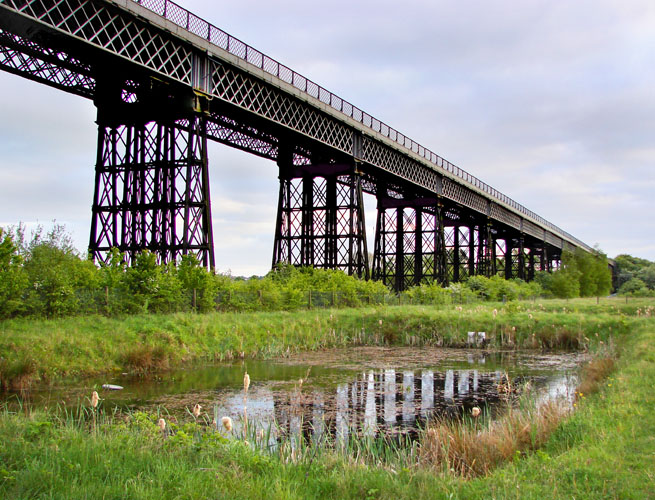
Bennerley Viaduct in May 2009

Frustrated by Midland Railway obstruction of GNR access to coal traffic, the GNR decided to build its own line from Colwick, east of Nottingham, through to the Derbyshire coalfields. The line circled round the north of Nottingham and then west to Kimberley, before it struck north to Pinxton, in the Erewash Valley, opening in 1875, followed by a westward line through Derby and on from there to a junction with the North Staffordshire Railway at Egginton, giving access to Burton-on-Trent. This line opened in 1878.

The terrain crossed at the Nottingham end of the line was exceptionally difficult, and costly, but it undoubtedly paid off, as lucrative coal traffic expanded enormously. Colwick was made a distribution and marshalling centre for the GNR's Derbyshire colliery traffic. A large group of sorting sidings were installed, and engine shed and wagon repair facilities; the Colwick yard was expanded repeatedly over later years, eventually having a capacity for 6,000 vehicles. The GNR had given the London and North Western Railway running powers over the Derbyshire lines, and this proved extremely profitable for the LNWR, which made a connection over the Great Northern and LNWR joint line.

By contrast the line beyond Derby was agricultural, and correspondingly more moderate commercially, but through freight on the line towards Burton was considerable. The construction of the line through Derby caused considerable demolition of housing, but the station was more central than the Midland station.

Not far from Egginton, near the western extremity of the line, was the Stafford and Uttoxeter Railway. The GNR purchased the S&UR for £100,000 in 1882; it was a moribund company, and the purchase was not advantageous.

Road competition hit the part of the extension line west of Derby, and in 1939 the passenger service was withdrawn because of the war emergency.

Coalowners in the Leen Valley petitioned the GNR for a line in their area, as they were dissatisfied with the service offered by the monopoly Midland Railway. The Leen Valley line was opened from Bulwell to Annesley in 1881, soon conveying extraordinary volumes of coal. Pits further north wanted a connection too, and this was supplied by the Leen Valley Extension line, opened from 1898.

== Strikes and losses ==
Great Northern Railway Act 1887
- Act of Parliament
- Parliament of the United Kingdom
- Long title: An Act to confer further powers upon the Great Northern Railway Company with respect to their own undertaking and undertakings in which they are jointly interested and upon the Halifax High Level and North and South Junction Railway Company with respect to their undertaking and for other purposes.
- Citation: 50 & 51 Vict. c. xciii

Dates
- Royal assent: 5 July 1887

Text of statute as originally enacted

The early 1880s began badly for the GNR for a number of reasons: Coal strikes and poor harvests reduced income from goods traffic. Floods forced the complete closure of the Spalding to Bourne line from 9 October 1880 until 1 February 1881, this was a Midland & Eastern line worked by the GNR, and the GNR found themselves paying the lease on a line they could derive no revenue from; and worst of all, Sutton Bridge Docks opened on 14 May 1881, into which the GNR had invested £55,000, but within a few days the docks began to subside due to being built on unstable ground. The engineers could find no remedy and the investment was written off.

== Great Northern and Great Eastern Joint Railway ==
Throughout the 1870s the Great Eastern Railway made attempts to get access to the coalfields of the East Midlands and Yorkshire. The Great Northern Railway consistently resisted this in Parliament, but finally decided that it was only a matter of time before the GER got what it wanted. The outcome was a joint parliamentary bill, which obtained royal assent on 3 July as the Great Northern and Great Eastern Railway Companies Act 1879 (42 & 43 Vict. c. cx). Existing GNR lines from near Doncaster to Lincoln, and from Spalding to March would be transferred to Joint ownership, as would the GER lines from Huntingdon to St Ives, and from St Ives to March. A new line was to be built from Spalding to Lincoln, and a joint committee was to be established to manage the line; it was not to be a corporate entity.

The Spalding to Lincoln line opened in 1882. The GER got the coalfield access it wanted. The GNR had a line which in part relieved the main line, although the Spalding–March–Huntingdon section was hardly suitable for running mineral trains in any quantity. Lord Colville, chairman of the GNR, said that it was better to have half the receipts of a joint line than to have to compete with a new entirely foreign through line.

== GN and LNW Joint Line, and the Leicester branch ==
After some false starts, the GNR and the London and North Western Railway were authorised by the Great Northern and London and North-western Railway Companies (Joint Powers and New Lines) Act 1874 (37 & 38 Vict. c. clvii) to build railways in Leicestershire. These became the GN and LNWR Joint Line from Bottesford (on the Grantham to Nottingham line), to Market Harborough. The act also authorised two sections of GNR new line: from Newark to Bottesford (opened in 1878) and from Marefield (near the southern end of the joint line) to Leicester (opened in 1882). The joint line itself opened in stages between 1879 and 1883.

The LNWR did well from the joint line, getting access to the Nottinghamshire coalfield formerly in the hands of the GNR alone; and when the Derbyshire and Staffordshire Extension was ready, they got even better access. The advantage to the GNR was much less; the joint line was never busy, and passenger traffic at the GNR Leicester station was disappointing.

== Quadrupling in the south ==
Great Northern Railway Act 1901
- Act of Parliament
- Parliament of the United Kingdom
- Long title: An Act to confer further powers upon the Great Northern Railway Company.
- Citation: 1 Edw. 7. c. xxiii

Dates
- Royal assent: 2 July 1901

Text of statute as originally enacted

Widening of the London end of the main line was completed in the 1890s.

== Enfield Railway and the Hertford Loop ==
Work started in 1905 to extend the Enfield Branch Railway in order to relieve congestion on the East Coast Main Line. Cuffley was reached on 4 April 1910, but construction of two major viaducts and the 2,684 yards or 2,454 metres Ponsbourne Tunnel combined with wartime shortages of men and materials, delayed the opening of the route to Stevenage until 4 March 1918 for goods services. The line finally opened to passengers on 2 June 1924 as the Hertford Loop Line.

== First World War ==
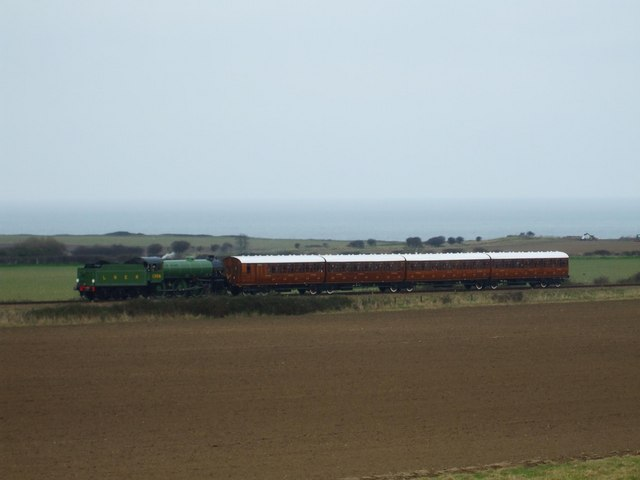
GNR designed stock built under the LNER in 1924

During World War I, economies were made, beginning on 22 February 1915 with a general reduction of train services. Passenger trains generally became fewer, but longer. An agreement was reached with the Great Central Railway and the Great Eastern Railway regarding the common use of wagons. Further economies were made in 1916 when the Nottingham to Daybrook and Peterborough to Leicester passenger services were withdrawn and never reinstated.

== 1920s ==
Under the 1923 Grouping, the Great Northern became part of the London and North Eastern Railway.

== Train services ==
The GNR operated services from London King's Cross to York together with many secondary lines and branches. The Great Northern was a partner (with the North Eastern Railway and the North British Railway) in the East Coast Joint Stock operation from 1860.

The GNR was a considerable user of slip coaches when this was fashionable. Stamford had four slips per day, either at Essendine or Peterborough. The 5.30 pm from Kings Cross had slips at Huntingdon, Peterborough, Newark and Worksop. The company went to great pains to enable people to stay in their carriages; at one time around 1905 two carriages were taken off a train from the North at Kings Cross and sent by way of York Road and the Metropolitan Railway and SE & CR to Clapham Junction, where, attached to some LNWR carriages, they were worked forward to Weymouth by the London and South Western Railway.

== Accidents ==
- On 21 January 1876, an express passenger train ran into the rear of a freight train at Abbots Ripton, Huntingdonshire, when signals became frozen in the "clear" position during a blizzard. Thirteen people were killed and 59 were injured.
- On 14 April 1876, an express train ran into the rear of a mail train at Corby, Northamptonshire, when signals froze in the "clear" position during a blizzard.
- On 23 December 1876, an express train overran signals and collided with a number of wagons at Arlesey Sidings, Bedfordshire. Six people were killed.
- On 7 March 1896, a passenger train derailed at Little Bytham, Lincolnshire, when a speed restriction was removed prematurely after track renewal. Two people were killed.
- On 19 September 1906, a sleeping-car train derailed at Grantham, Lincolnshire, when it passed signals at danger and ran through the station at excessive speed. Fourteen people were killed and seventeen were injured.

== See also ==
- Locomotives of the Great Northern Railway

== Sources ==
- Grinling, Charles Herbert (1898). The history of the Great Northern Railway, 1845-1895. London: Methuen & Co. OCLC 560899371.
