= Shoreham =

Shoreham may refer to:

== Places ==
=== Australia ===
- Shoreham, Victoria

=== United Kingdom ===
- Shoreham, Kent
  - Shoreham railway station
- Shoreham-by-Sea, West Sussex
  - Shoreham (UK Parliament constituency) 1974–1997
  - New Shoreham (UK Parliament constituency) 1295–1885
  - Shoreham (electoral division), a West Sussex County Council constituency
  - Shoreham Airport
  - Shoreham Airshow
  - 2015 Shoreham Airshow crash
  - Shoreham-by-Sea railway station

=== United States ===
- Shoreham, Michigan
- Shoreham, New York
  - Shoreham Nuclear Power Plant
  - Shoreham station (LIRR), an abandoned Long Island Rail Road station
- Shoreham, Vermont
- Omni Shoreham Hotel, Washington, D.C., US
- The Shoreham, a building in the Lakeshore East development, Chicago, Illinois, US
- New Shoreham, Rhode Island, the primary town on Block Island

== Other uses ==
- Shoreham F.C., a football club in Shoreham-by-Sea, West Sussex
- HMS Shoreham, at least five ships of the Royal Navy
- Shoreham-class sloop, eight warships of the Royal Navy built in the 1930s

== See also ==
- New Shoreham (disambiguation)
- Port Shoreham, Nova Scotia, Canada
