= Fahnbulleh =

Fahnbulleh is a surname of Liberian origin.

== List of people with the surname ==
- Fatima Massaquoi-Fahnbulleh (1912–1978), Liberian educator
- Gamal Fahnbulleh (born 1982), British broadcast journalist and television presenter
- Henry Boimah Fahnbulleh (born 1949), Liberian politician and diplomat
- Joseph Fahnbulleh (born 2001), Liberian sprinter
- Miatta Fahnbulleh (disambiguation), several people

== See also ==
- Fahn (disambiguation)
- Farnborough (disambiguation)
- Buller (disambiguation)
