= Van Air Europe =

Czech passenger and cargo charter airline

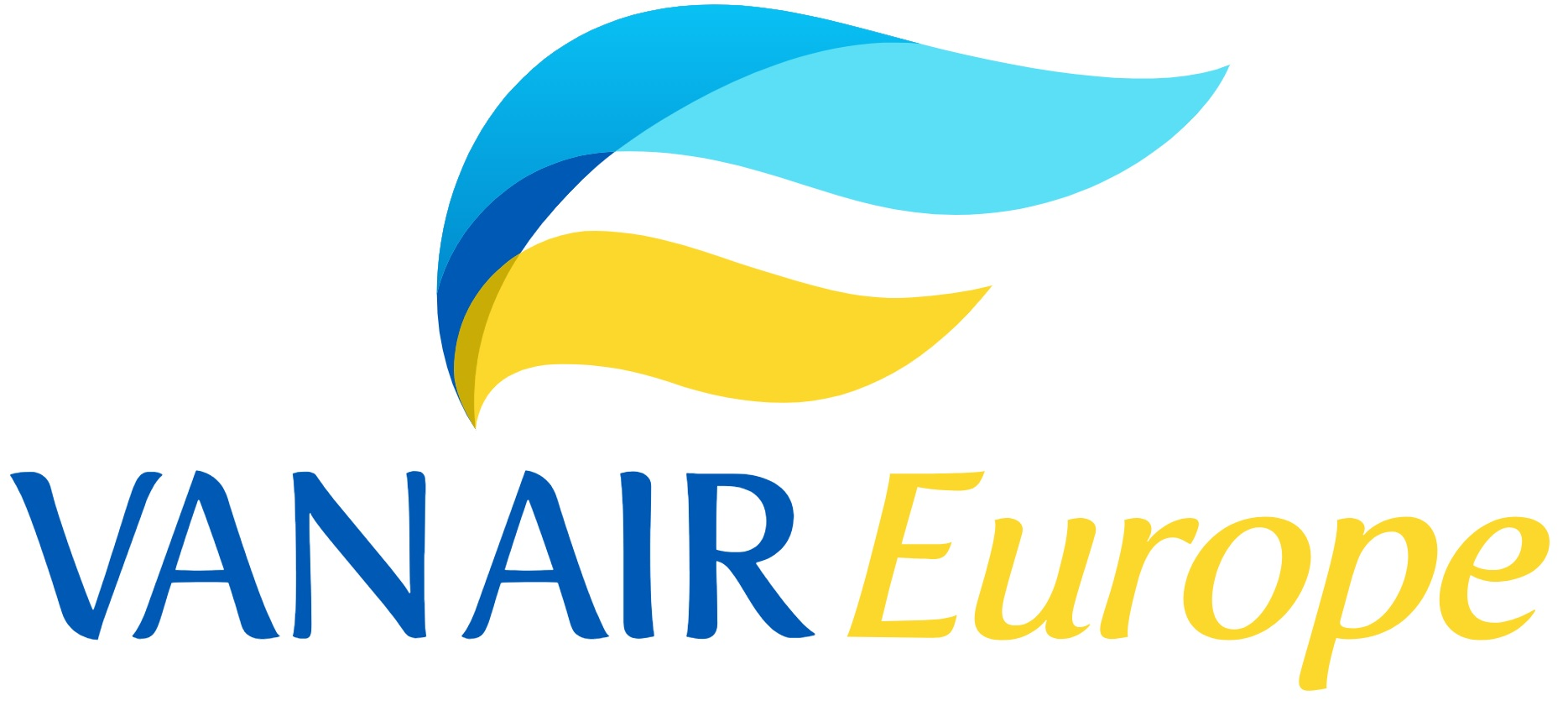

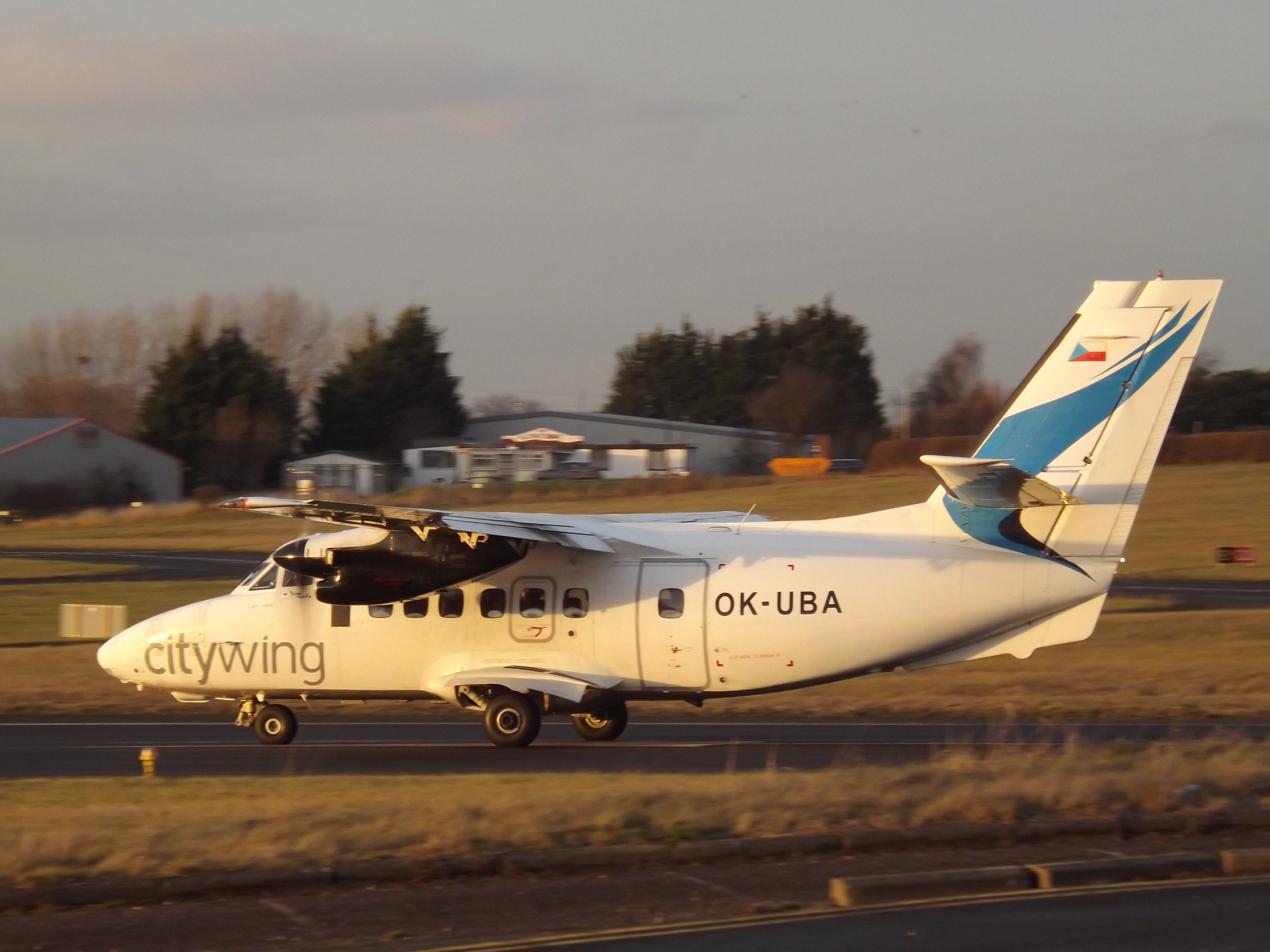
- Let L-410 Turbolet
IATA	ICAO	Call sign
V9	VAA	EUROVAN
- Founded: 2004
- Operating bases: Brno–Tuřany Airport
- Fleet size: 5
- Headquarters: Brno, Czech Republic
- Website: vanair.aero

VAN AIR Europe, a.s. is a Czech passenger and cargo charter airline headquartered in Brno and based at Brno–Tuřany Airport.

== History ==
The airline was founded in 2004. On 15 July 2006, the airline began operating flights on behalf of Citywing, operating flights out of Blackpool, the Isle of Man, Gloucester, Belfast City, Leeds/Bradford, Newcastle upon Tyne and Jersey. Until 6 May 2013, it also operated a Shoreham – Paris-Pontoise service on behalf of Brighton City Airways. A new service to Glasgow was inaugurated in March 2014.

The airline has operated in such diverse places such as Portugal, Italy, Croatia, Georgia, the Comoros, and France. Since 2023, the airline has been operating in French Guiana, fulfilling a very important need in ensuring passengers and goods reach remote areas.

Moreover, the airline has been operating OK-LRA, an aircraft fitted with PT6A-42 engines. This is significant, because the associated STC was obtained by the airline's sister company, AEROSERVIS, s.r.o., after approximately a decade of intense work and investment. The airline is a member of the European Regions Airline Association.

== Incidents ==
On 23 February 2017, a Van Air Europe Let L-410 (OK-LAZ), departed Ronaldsway Airport, Isle of Man operating a scheduled service on behalf of Citywing (schedule V9-502) to Belfast City Airport. During the latter stages of the aircraft's approach to Runway 04 at Belfast City the approach was discontinued as a consequence of adverse weather. An appraisal of the weather at both Belfast City and Belfast Aldergrove airports resulted in the crew diverting the aircraft back to the Isle of Man, touching down at Ronaldsway at 09:25hrs (GMT). The weather report for the time of arrival reported the wind blowing offset from the main runway by an angle of approximately 30 degrees, with a mean speed of 42 knots (48 mph; 78 km/h) and gusts of 56 knots (64 mph; 104 km/h) – at that time other operators had suspended operations. After landing the aircraft was instructed to stop by local Air Traffic Control, and the emergency services were requested. Passengers disembarked the aircraft without injury.

On 23 February 2017, the UK Civil Aviation Authority (CAA) revealed it had suspended Van Air's permission to fly in the United Kingdom. Following the response to Safety Recommendation 2018-005 made on 1 March 2018, the case was closed by the Air Accidents Investigation Branch (AAIB).

== Fleet ==
As of November 2021, the Van Air Europe fleet consists of the following aircraft:

Van Air Europe fleet
Aircraft	Total	Passengers	Notes
Let L-410 Turbolet	5	19	
