= Kent Air Ambulance =

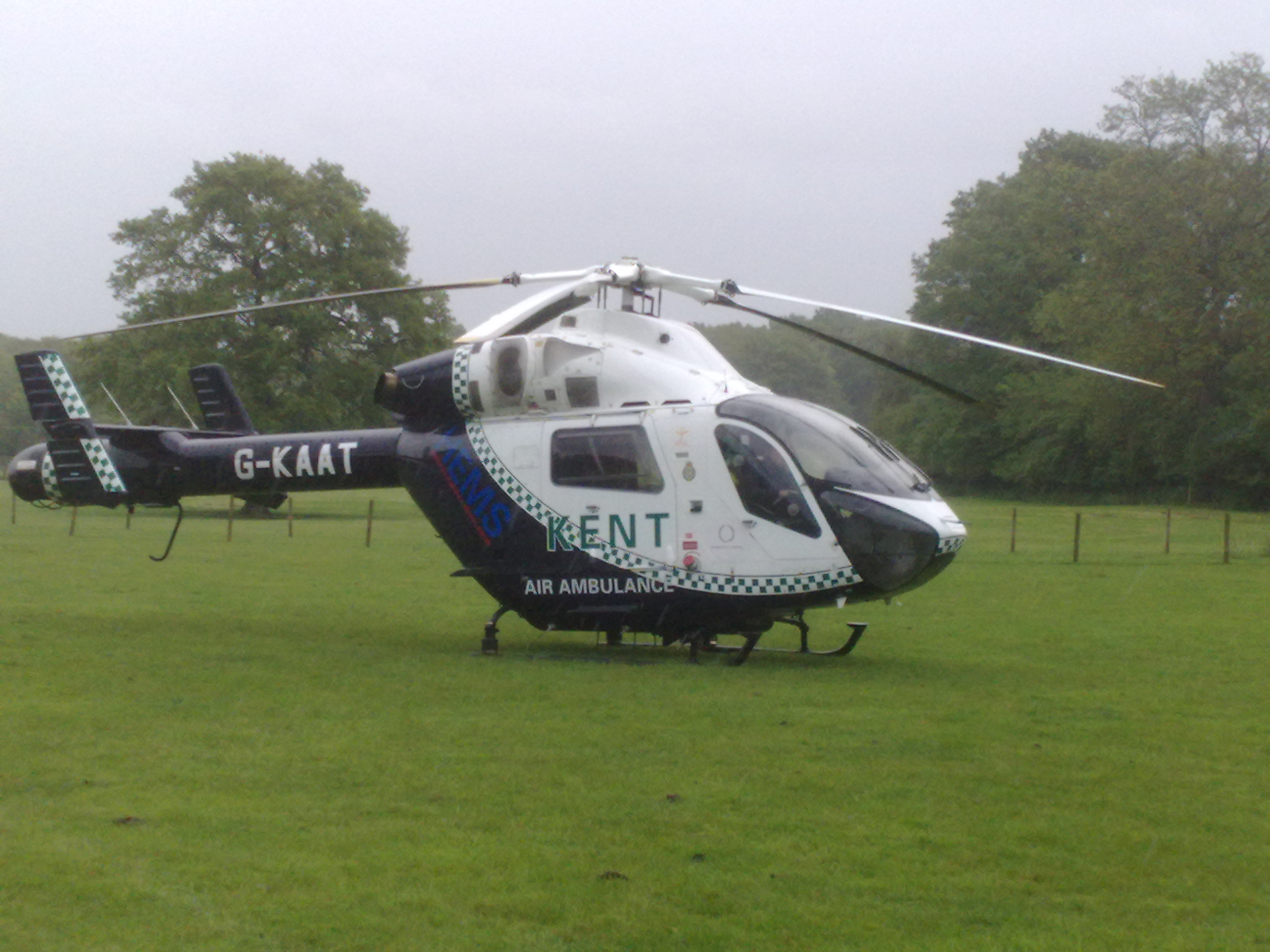
Kent Air Ambulance on a sortie in neighbouring Sussex

The Kent Air Ambulance was an organisation providing emergency medical services through the provision of a helicopter air ambulance covering the county of Kent in South East England. The helicopter was funded by the Kent Air Ambulance Trust (under the operating name of the Kent Air Ambulance Fund), which was a registered charity, raising money from public and private donations in excess of £4m every year between Kent, Sussex and Surrey. In June 2007, the service extended it areas of operation to Surrey and Sussex requiring an additional helicopter. It now operates as Air Ambulance Kent Surrey Sussex.

== Overview and history ==
The service was operated by the Kent Air Ambulance Trust, a registered charity established in 1989. The trust was founded by Kate Chivers (in whose honour the helicopter was named), and was originally called the South East Thames Air Ambulance. Initially operated on a part-time basis, the air ambulance became a seven-day service in January 2000 and shortly afterwards moved from its original Rochester Airport base to Marden near Maidstone.

It operated one McDonnell Douglas MD902 Explorer helicopter (registration G-KAAT) from Marden. This location, combined with its high cruise speed, quoted by the manufacturer as in excess of 150 mph, enabled the crew to reach almost all of the county within 15 minutes of takeoff (the exception being the farther reaches of Thanet which may take up to 20 minutes to reach).

In March 2008, it was announced that the trust would be collaborating with Sussex Police to provide a night time rescue service utilising the Sussex Police Air Operations Unit helicopter, Hotel 900, which is equipped to fly at night. Prior to this, the service was restricted to daylight operation only.

== 1998 crash ==
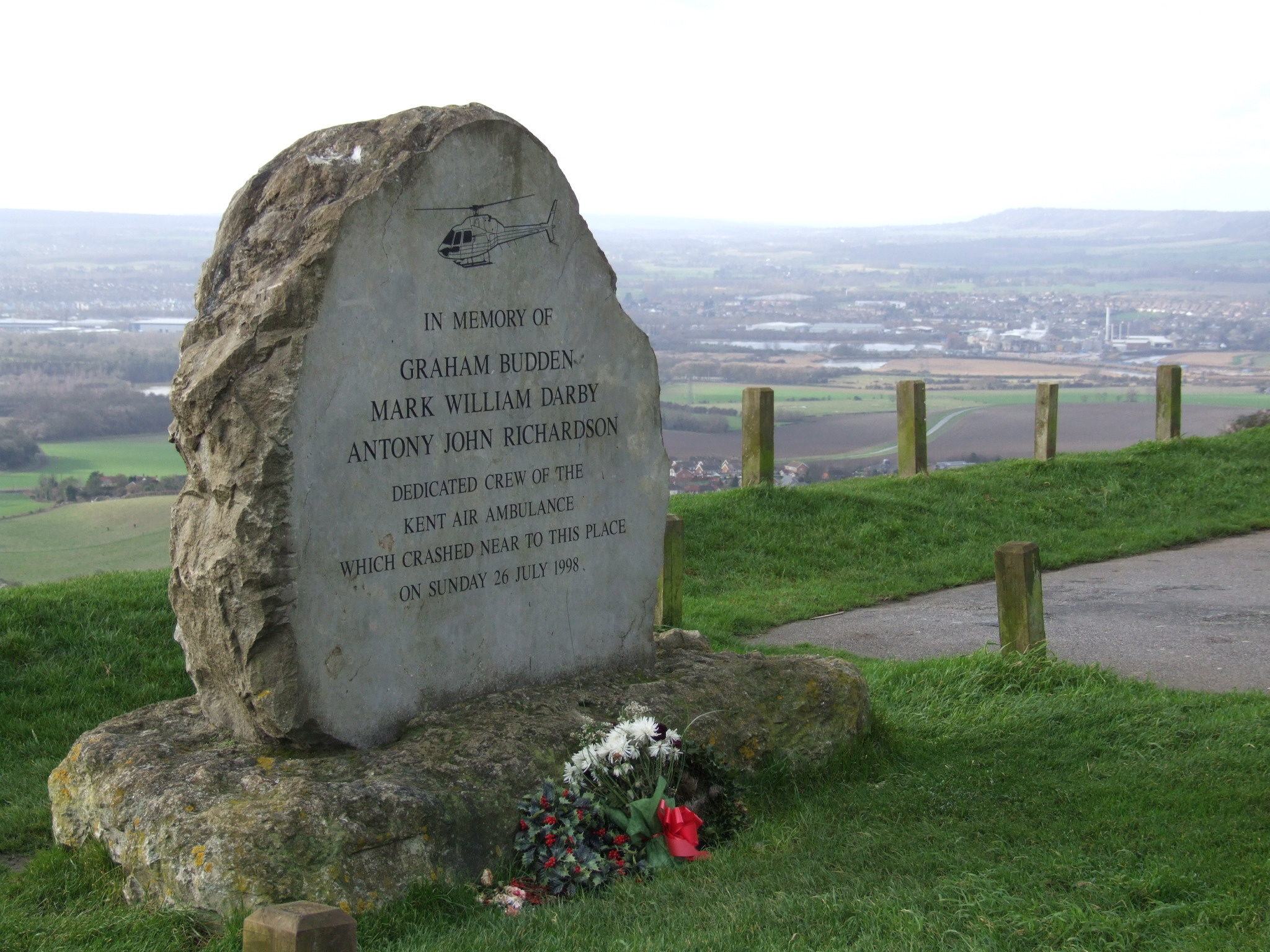
Memorial to the crash of the Kent Air Ambulance in 1998

In July 1998, the air ambulance, a Eurocopter AS355 Twin Squirrel, registration G-MASK, crashed in good weather after colliding with power cables near Burham while returning to Rochester Airport following an aborted call to attend a road accident. All three crew – the pilot, Graham Budden, and two paramedics, Tony Richardson and Mark Darby – were killed as the helicopter burst into flames on impact.

Initial investigation established no cause for the crash, due to the fireball produced on impact. Initially the pilot's employers, Police Aviation Services, denied liability. On 19 February 2004, following a civil case brought by the pilot's widow to the High Court in Manchester, it was ruled that the crash was caused by mechanical failure not, as had been suggested, flying low for fun, and ordered compensation to be paid.

A memorial to the crew is located at the Blue Bell Hill picnic site, close to the scene of the crash.

== Expansion ==
In June 2007, following a two-year fundraising campaign, spearheaded by Penelope Keith, the trust began operating a second helicopter from a new base at Dunsfold Aerodrome in Surrey, serving the Surrey and Sussex area. This newer service operated as the Surrey and Sussex Air Ambulance. This aircraft was subsequently relocated to Redhill Aerodrome and was capable of night flight.

== See also ==
- Air ambulances in the United Kingdom
- Healthcare in Kent
- South East Coast Ambulance Service
