= Simply Jet =

- Industry: Business aviation
- Founded: 2016
- Founders: Yann-Guillaume Jaccard; Patrick Rossire; Matthieu Orioli
- Headquarters: Lausanne, Switzerland
- Number of locations: 4
- Key people: Yann-Guillaume Jaccard (CEO and co-founder); Patrick Rossire (CFO and co-founder); Matthieu Orioli (COO and co-founder); Stéphanie Pastorek (CCO and partner); Gaétan Drossart (CMO and partner)
- Services: Private jet charter, sales and acquisition
- Website: simply-jet.ch

Simply Jet is a Swiss private aviation brokerage company with its headquarters in Lausanne. It arranges charter flights through third-party operators rather than flying its own aircraft and has offered aircraft sales and acquisition services since 2023.

== History ==
Simply Jet was incorporated as a société anonyme (SA) under Swiss law in 2016. The company was co-founded by Yann-Guillaume Jaccard, Patrick Rossire and Matthieu Orioli who had studied together at the École hôtelière de Lausanne. The company was first registered in Neuchâtel before its headquarters moved to Lausanne.

The company expanded beyond Switzerland during this period, opening an office in the London area, in Farnborough, in September 2020, with James Burton appointed to lead it. By late 2021, it had also launched a broker jet card product, sourcing flights from a fixed group of operators rather than holding its own fleet. In the same year, Bilan reported that the company had expanded its workforce and was planning further European expansion into the UK and Germany, following increased demand for intra-European private flights during the COVID-19 pandemic. An office in Paris followed, and in May 2023 the company opened a fourth location in Zurich alongside a new aircraft sales and acquisition division, its first service outside charter brokerage. By 2025, the company arranged approximately 2,500 flights annually, and had reported revenue of CHF 40 million.

In the first quarter of 2026, Simply Jet completed the sale of two business jets, including a 2017 Cessna Citation M2 and a 1999 Learjet 60.

== Operations ==
The company has offices in Lausanne, London, Zurich and Paris. Simply Jet does not operate aircraft itself. It brokers charter flights through third-party companies holding the required air operator's certificates, and separately provides group charter and aircraft sales and acquisition services.
