= Faehn =

Faehn is a surname. Notable people with the surname include:

- Bob Faehn (1958–2021), American politician
- Rhonda Faehn (born 1971), American gymnast and gymnastics coach

== See also ==
- Fahn
