= Farnborough =

Farnborough may refer to:

== Australia ==
- Farnborough, Queensland, a locality in the Shire of Livingstone

== United Kingdom ==
- Farnborough, Hampshire, a town in the Rushmoor district of Hampshire, England
  - Farnborough (Main) railway station, a railway station in the town of Farnborough, Hampshire
  - Farnborough North railway station, a railway station in the town of Farnborough, Hampshire
- Farnborough, Berkshire, a small village
- Farnborough, London, a settlement in the London Borough of Bromley
- Farnborough, Warwickshire, a village and civil parish in the English county of Warwickshire
- Farnborough Rural District, a rural district in Warwickshire, England, from 1894 to 1932

== See also ==
- Farnborough Airport, at Farnborough, Hampshire, formerly the Royal Aircraft Establishment
- Farnborough College of Technology
- Farnborough F.C., an English football team in Farnborough, Hampshire
- Farnborough International Airshow, a five-day international trade fair held biennially in Hampshire
- Farnborough International Exhibition & Conference Centre, a multi-functional venue in Farnborough, Hampshire
- Royal Aircraft Establishment, during its time at Farnborough airfield
- Saint Michael's Abbey, Farnborough, a Benedictine abbey in Farnborough, Hampshire
- Sixth Form College, Farnborough
- Farmborough, a village in Somerset, England
- Fahnbulleh, a surname pronounced similarly
