= Brighton City Airways =

British airline ticket reseller

City Airways Limited
- Trade name: Brighton City Airways
- Company type: Virtual airline
- Industry: Travel
- Founded: 20 November 2012
- Founder: Neil Laughton (CEO); Jonathan Candelon (CEO)
- Defunct: 6 May 2013
- Fate: Defunct 2013
- Headquarters: Shoreham (Brighton City) Airport, West Sussex, United Kingdom
- Products: Virtual airline
- Parent: City Airways Limited
- Website: www.brightoncityairways.com

City Airways Limited, trading as Brighton City Airways, was a short-lived British virtual airline that sold tickets for one route, Shoreham Airport (West Sussex) to Cormeilles Aerodrome, Pontoise, 16 miles (26 km) north west of Paris, France, between March 2013 and May 2013.

As a virtual and unlicensed airline the route was operated by Van Air Europe.

== History ==
Brighton City Airways was launched in November 2012 as a trading name for City Airways Limited. The company commenced operations on 6 March 2013. Van Air Europe, a Czech airline, operated a Let L-410 Turbolet, a small 19-seater commuter aircraft, to operate the route on behalf of Brighton City Airways.

Service commenced on 6 March 2013 and was suspended on 6 May 2013 with no date for a resumption of flights. The company indicated that the suspension was due to "ongoing French Customs and Immigration delays in setting up a point of entry at Paris Pontoise airport". The flights had been obliged to land at a customs airport in France first to clear customs, usually Rouen Airport or Le Touquet – Côte d'Opale Airport.
