= Farnborough Airshow crash =

Jet fighter crash in England

Farnborough Airshow DH.110 crash
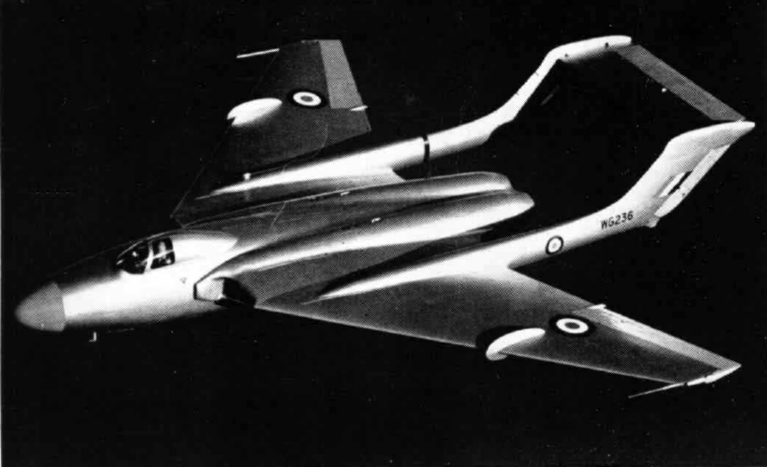
- The DH.110 prototype, WG236

Accident
- Date: 6 September 1952
- Summary: In-flight breakup due to structural failure
- Site: Farnborough Airport, Hampshire, England; 51°16′33″N 00°46′35″W
- Total fatalities: 31
- Total injuries: 60

Aircraft
- Aircraft type: de Havilland DH.110
- Operator: de Havilland
- Registration: WG236
- Crew: 2
- Fatalities: 2
- Survivors: 0

Ground casualties
- Ground fatalities: 29
- Ground injuries: 60

On 6 September 1952, a prototype de Havilland DH.110 jet fighter crashed during an aerial display at the Farnborough Airshow in Hampshire, England. The jet disintegrated mid-air during an aerobatic manoeuvre, killing pilot John Derry and onboard flight test observer Anthony Richards. Debris fell onto a crowd of spectators, killing 29 and injuring 60.

The cause was determined to be structural failure due to a design flaw in the wing's leading edge. All DH.110s were initially grounded, but after modification to its design, the type entered service with the Royal Navy as the Sea Vixen.

Stricter safety procedures were enacted for UK air shows and there were no further spectator fatalities until the 2015 Shoreham Airshow crash in which 11 people died. (Note: Four spectators were killed while on a helicopter experience at the Biggin Hill Air Show in 1978.)

== Incident ==
=== Crew ===
The aircraft had a crew of two, pilot John Derry and onboard flight test observer Anthony Richards. Thirty-year-old Derry had served in the Royal Air Force, initially as a wireless operator/air gunner before completing pilot training in Canada. He flew Hawker Typhoons and was made commander of No. 182 Squadron RAF in March 1945. Derry was awarded the Distinguished Flying Cross in June 1945 and later was awarded the Bronze Lion for his role in the liberation of the Netherlands. After demobilisation, he became an experimental test pilot, winning the Segrave Trophy in 1948 for "breaking the 100 km closed circuit aeroplane record at Hatfield, Hertfordshire. Flying a de Havilland DH 108 he reached a speed of 605.23 mph (973.8 km/h)."

Richards was 25 years old and a graduate member of the Royal Aeronautical Society. Having worked for de Havilland as an apprentice, he became a member of the flight-test section in December 1948, and in April 1952 became the first British flight test observer to exceed the speed of sound, with Derry piloting.

=== Crash ===
The planned demonstration of the DH.110 on that day was nearly cancelled when the aircraft at Farnborough, serial number WG240, an all-black night fighter prototype, became unserviceable. It was de Havilland's second DH.110 prototype, and had been taken supersonic over the show on the opening day. Derry and Richards then collected WG236, the first DH.110 prototype, from de Havilland's factory in Hatfield, Hertfordshire, and flew it to Farnborough, starting their display at around 3:45 p.m.

Following a supersonic dive and flypast from 40,000 feet (12,000 m) and during a left bank at about 450 knots (830 km/h; 520 mph) toward the air show's 120,000 spectators, the pilot pulled up into a climb. In less than a second, the aircraft disintegrated: the outer sections of the wing, both engines and the cockpit separated from the airframe. The cockpit, with the two crew members still inside, fell right in front of the spectators nearest the runway, injuring several people. The engines travelled much further on a ballistic trajectory; one engine crashed harmlessly, but the second one ploughed into the so-called Observation Hill, causing most of the fatalities. The rest of the airframe fluttered down and crashed on the opposite side of the runway.

One eyewitness was Richard Gardner, then five years old. He recalled in adulthood:

I'll never forget, it looked like confetti, looked like silver confetti. The remaining airframe floated down right in front of us. It just came down like a leaf. And then the two engines, like two missiles, shot out of the airframe and hurtled in the direction of the airshow. There was a sort of silence, then people, one or two people screamed but mostly it was just a sort of shock. You could hear some people sort of whimpering which was quite shocking.

Sixty-three years later, speaking on the BBC Today radio programme in the wake of the 2015 Shoreham Airshow crash, author Moyra Bremner recalled her own traumatic experience. A huge bang silenced the crowd and was followed by "My God, look out" from the commentator. Bremner, standing on the roof of her parents' car, realised that an engine was heading straight towards her. It passed a few feet over her head, a "massive shining cylinder", and then plunged into the crowd on the hill behind.

Following the accident the air display programme continued once the debris was cleared from the runway, with Neville Duke exhibiting the prototype Hawker Hunter and taking it supersonic over the show later that day.

=== Casualties ===
Derry and Richards were killed together with 29 spectators on the ground. It took 69 years for the civilian casualties to be commemorated - a memorial consisting of 32 bricks inscribed with the name of the airshow and its 31 casualties was unveiled at the Farnborough Air Sciences Museum 6 September 2021.

=== Aftermath ===
Elizabeth II and Duncan Sandys, the Minister of Supply, both sent messages of condolence. The coroner's jury recorded that Derry and Richards had "died accidentally in the normal course of their duty", and that "the deaths [of the spectators] were accidental", adding that "no blame is attached to Mr. John Derry". Group Captain Sidney Weetman Rochford Hughes, the commandant of the Experimental Flying Department, gave expert testimony, saying, "From previous experience of Mr Derry's flying demonstrations here on the four days of the display, from the messages received from him on the radio-telephone, and from investigation of the wreckage, I am convinced that the pilot had no warning whatsoever of the impending failure of his aircraft."

== Investigation ==
Author Brian Rivas, who co-wrote the 1982 book John Derry, The Story of Britain's First Supersonic Pilot suggested that as Derry straightened up the aircraft and pulled into a climb, the outer part of the starboard wing failed and broke off followed by the same section of the port wing. The subsequent sudden change to the centre of pressure made the aircraft "rear up", tearing off the cockpit section, the two engines and the tailplane. The break-up of the DH.110 took less than one second. According to Rivas, subsequent investigations showed that the wing failed because it had only 64% of its intended strength. The redesigned DH.110 resumed flights in June 1953 and was eventually developed into the de Havilland Sea Vixen naval fighter.

More stringent airshow safety measures were subsequently introduced: jets were obliged to keep at least 230 m (750 ft) from crowds if flying straight and 450 m (1,480 ft) when performing manoeuvres, and always at an altitude of at least 150 m (490 ft).

== See also ==
- List of air show accidents and incidents in the 20th century
