= Boissy-l'Aillerie =

- Commune
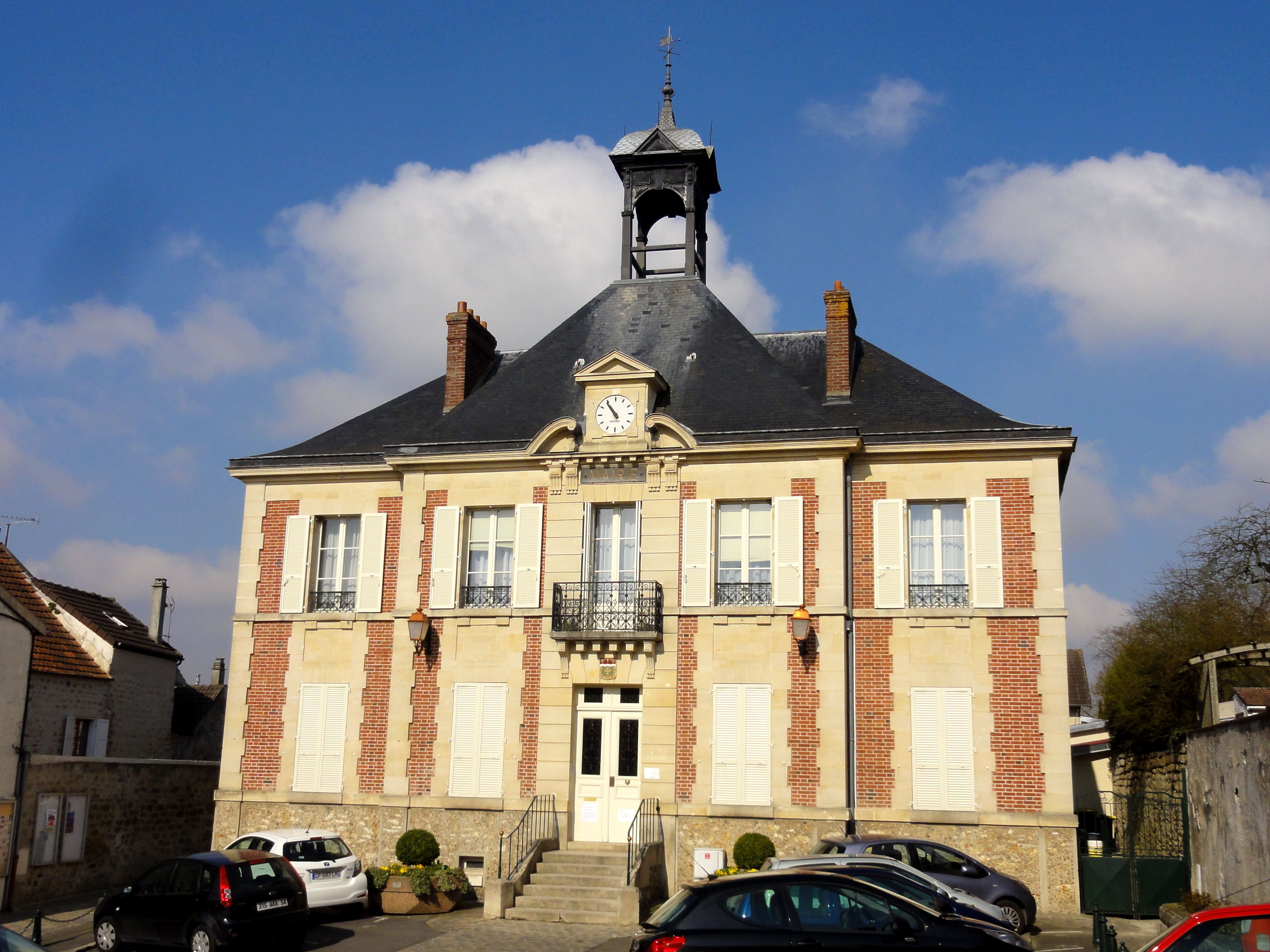
- The town hall in Boissy-l'Aillerie

- Coat of arms
- Location of Boissy-l'Aillerie
- Location within France Location within Île-de-France (region)
- Coordinates: 49°04′45″N 2°01′56″E
- Country: France
- Region: Île-de-France
- Department: Val-d'Oise
- Arrondissement: Pontoise
- Canton: Pontoise
- Intercommunality: Vexin Centre

Government
  - Mayor (2020–2026): Michel Guiard
- Area^{1}: 6.53 km^{2} (2.52 sq mi)
- Highest elevation: 99 m (325 ft)
- Lowest elevation: 37 m (121 ft)
- Population (2023): 2,120
  - Density: 325/km^{2} (841/sq mi)
- Time zone: UTC+01:00 (CET)
  - Summer (DST): UTC+02:00 (CEST)
- INSEE/Postal code: 95078 /95650
- ^{1} French Land Register data, which excludes lakes, ponds, glaciers > 1 km^{2} (0.386 sq mi or 247 acres) and river estuaries.

Boissy-l'Aillerie is a commune in the Val-d'Oise department in Île-de-France in northern France.

Pontoise – Cormeilles Aerodrome is located in the commune. At one time Aigle Azur's head office was on the grounds of the airport.

== Geography ==
=== Climate ===
Boissy-l'Aillerie has an oceanic climate (Köppen climate classification Cfb). The average annual temperature in Boissy-l'Aillerie is 11.2 °C (52.2 °F). The average annual rainfall is 635.8 mm (25.03 in) with December as the wettest month. The temperatures are highest on average in July, at around 18.9 °C (66.0 °F), and lowest in January, at around 4.3 °C (39.7 °F). The highest temperature ever recorded in Boissy-l'Aillerie was 41.6 °C (106.9 °F) on 25 July 2019; the coldest temperature ever recorded was −17.8 °C (0.0 °F) on 17 January 1985.

Climate data for Boissy-l'Aillerie (Pontoise - Aero, altitude 87m, 1991–2020 normals, extremes 1946–present)
Month	Jan	Feb	Mar	Apr	May	Jun	Jul	Aug	Sep	Oct	Nov	Dec	Year
Record high °C (°F)	15.5 (59.9)	20.0 (68.0)	25.6 (78.1)	29.3 (84.7)	32.5 (90.5)	37.1 (98.8)	41.6 (106.9)	39.2 (102.6)	34.9 (94.8)	28.8 (83.8)	21.7 (71.1)	17.4 (63.3)	41.6 (106.9)
Mean daily maximum °C (°F)	7.0 (44.6)	8.2 (46.8)	12.0 (53.6)	15.6 (60.1)	19.0 (66.2)	22.3 (72.1)	24.9 (76.8)	24.9 (76.8)	21.0 (69.8)	16.0 (60.8)	10.7 (51.3)	7.4 (45.3)	15.8 (60.4)
Daily mean °C (°F)	4.3 (39.7)	4.8 (40.6)	7.6 (45.7)	10.2 (50.4)	13.6 (56.5)	16.7 (62.1)	18.9 (66.0)	18.8 (65.8)	15.5 (59.9)	11.9 (53.4)	7.5 (45.5)	4.7 (40.5)	11.2 (52.2)
Mean daily minimum °C (°F)	1.6 (34.9)	1.4 (34.5)	3.2 (37.8)	4.8 (40.6)	8.2 (46.8)	11.0 (51.8)	12.9 (55.2)	12.8 (55.0)	10.0 (50.0)	7.7 (45.9)	4.4 (39.9)	2.1 (35.8)	6.7 (44.1)
Record low °C (°F)	−17.8 (0.0)	−15.4 (4.3)	−11.1 (12.0)	−4.6 (23.7)	−1.6 (29.1)	1.0 (33.8)	4.0 (39.2)	3.1 (37.6)	−0.6 (30.9)	−5.2 (22.6)	−10.2 (13.6)	−16.0 (3.2)	−17.8 (0.0)
Average precipitation mm (inches)	54.1 (2.13)	45.9 (1.81)	46.9 (1.85)	43.9 (1.73)	59.8 (2.35)	50.2 (1.98)	51.6 (2.03)	55.4 (2.18)	46.7 (1.84)	58.2 (2.29)	54.8 (2.16)	68.3 (2.69)	635.8 (25.03)
Average precipitation days (≥ 1.0 mm)	10.8	9.4	9.0	9.0	9.5	8.9	8.1	7.9	7.9	10.3	10.5	11.9	113.1
Source: Météo-France

== Population ==
Historical population
Year	Pop.	±% p.a.
1968	991	—
1975	1,091	+1.38%
1982	1,237	+1.81%
1990	1,659	+3.74%
1999	1,668	+0.06%
2007	1,762	+0.69%
2012	1,794	+0.36%
2017	1,816	+0.24%
2023	2,120	+2.61%
Source: INSEE

== Education ==
As of 2015, the communal preschool (maternelle) had 65 students and the communal elementary school had 128 students.

== See also ==
- Communes of the Val-d'Oise department
