= Farnborough International Airshow =

UK airshow and arms trade exhibition

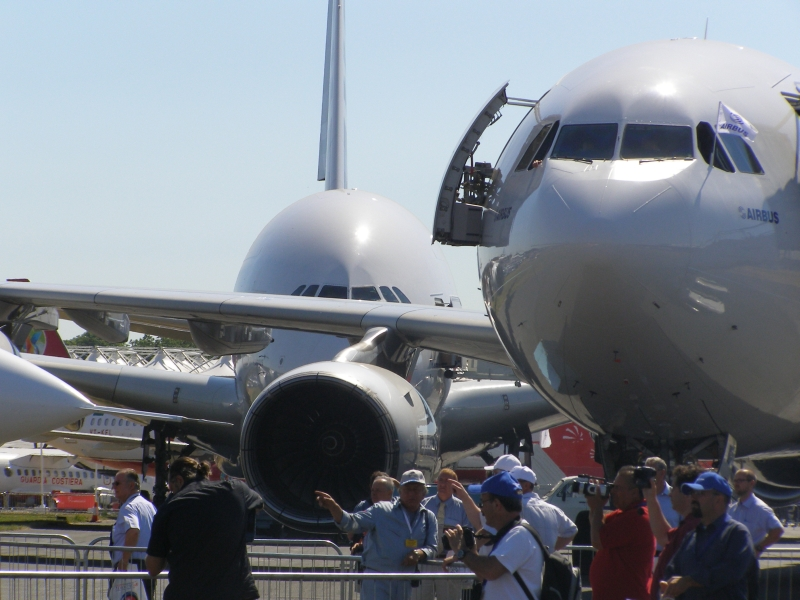
- Farnborough in 2006
- Genre: Air show
- Dates: July
- Frequency: Biennial: Even years
- Venue: Farnborough International Exhibition & Conference Centre, Farnborough, Hampshire, England, United Kingdom
- Established: 1948
- Previous event: 20–24 July 2026
- Next event: 24–28 July 2028
- Attendance: 209,000 (2012)
- Organiser: Farnborough International Limited (ADS Group)
- Website: www.farnboroughairshow.com

The Farnborough International Airshow is a trade exhibition for the aerospace and defence industries, where civilian and military aircraft are demonstrated to potential customers and investors in Farnborough, Hampshire, England. Since its first show in 1948, Farnborough has seen the debut of many famous aeroplanes, including the Vickers VC10, Concorde, the Eurofighter, the Airbus A380, and the Lockheed Martin F-35 Lightning II. At the 1958 show, Hawker Hunters of the RAF's Black Arrows executed a 22-aircraft formation loop, setting a new world record.

The international trade show runs for five days. Until 2020, the show ran for a full week with the first five days reserved for trade visitors and the general public attending on the weekend.

== Status ==
The Farnborough International Airshow is the second-largest show of its kind after the Paris Air Show.

The event is held in mid-July in even-numbered years at Farnborough International Exhibition & Conference Centre in Hampshire, United Kingdom. Flying occurs on all five days, and there are also static displays of aircraft outside and booths and stands in the indoor exhibition halls. The airshow alternates with the Paris Air Show, which is held in odd-numbered years and has a similar format, and is held in the same years as the Berlin Air Show. It is organised by Farnborough International Limited, a wholly owned subsidiary of the ADS Group. In 2012, it attracted 109,000 trade visitors over the first five days, and 100,000 public visitors during the weekend. Orders and commitments for 758 aircraft were announced, worth US$72 billion.

== History ==
The Society of British Aircraft Constructors held its first flying and static display at Hendon Aerodrome in June 1932. An invitation only flying display was held on 27 June 1932 and some of the aircraft were on static display in the "new aircraft park" during the previous weekend when the Royal Air Force pageant was held.

For the sixth annual display in 1938 the event moved to the nearby de Havilland airfield at Hatfield, the last before the Second World War.

The show recommenced in 1946 at Handley Page works at Radlett in north London until 1947. In 1948, it moved to the Royal Aircraft Establishment field at Farnborough, Hampshire.

=== 1940s ===
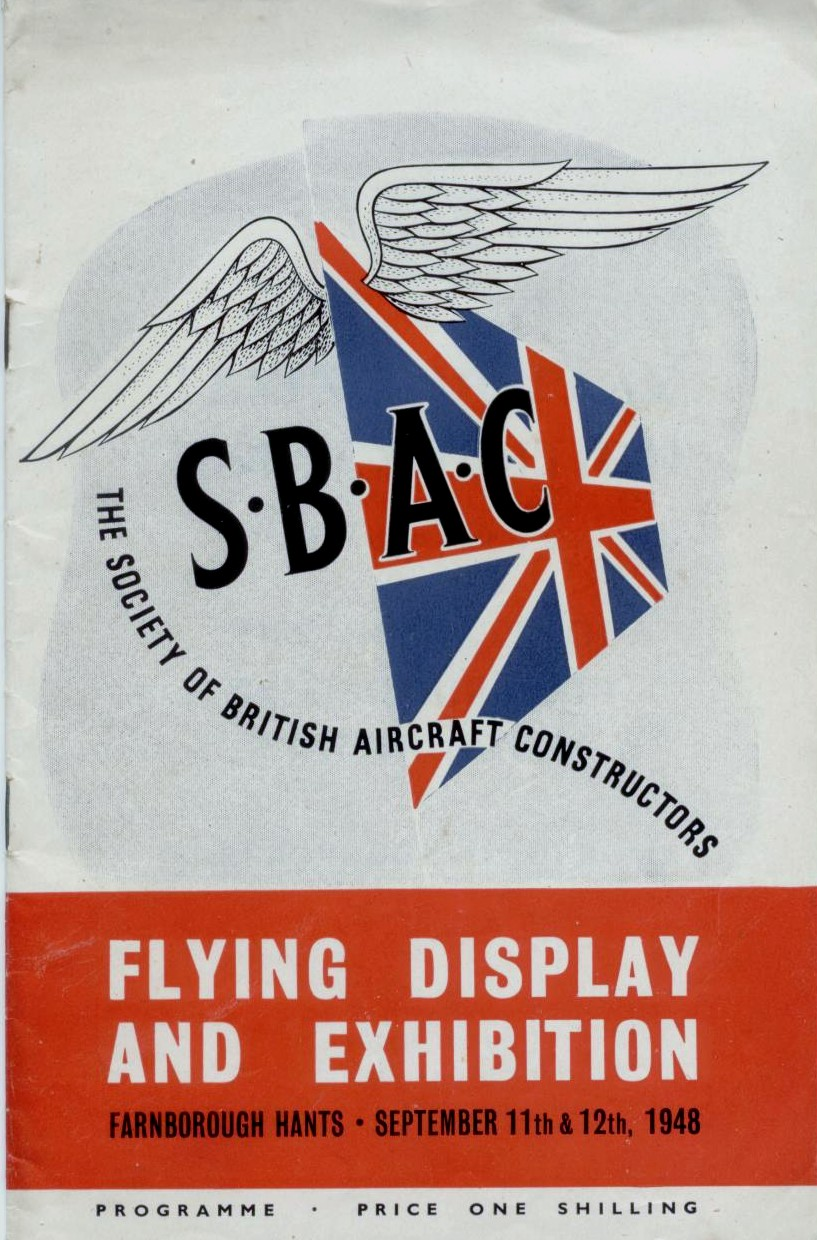
Cover of the 1948 Farnborough Airshow programme

The inaugural show took place on the first week of September 1948 and all of the static aircraft and supporting display stands were concentrated in the NE corner of the airfield with 'A-Shed' as the main 'West Exhibition Hall' and the soon-to-be famous 'Black Sheds' housing a smaller 'East Exhibition Hall' and refreshments for guests on trade days and the public at the weekend. Among the many aircraft on display were the Armstrong Whitworth A.W.52 jet-powered flying wing and the prototype Vickers Viscount airliner. The de Havilland Comet jet airliner was shown in 1949. In 1950 the huge Bristol Brabazon airliner made its debut, powered by coupled Bristol Centaurus piston engines before the Bristol Proteus turboprops for longer ranges like London-New York nonstop. A modified Vickers Viscount was shown with Rolls-Royce Tay turbojets in a configuration mimicked later by the Boeing 737.

=== 1950s ===
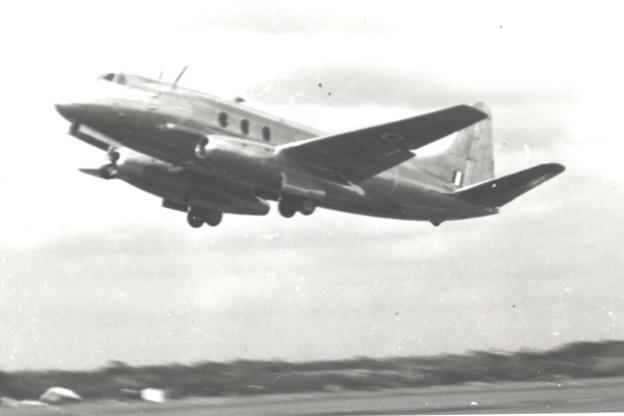
Vickers Viscount with Rolls-Royce Tays in 1950

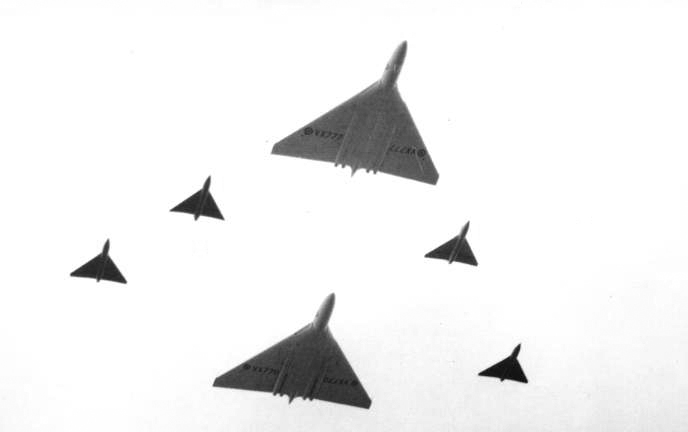
avro type 698s and Avro 707s formation in 1953

In 1952, the futuristic Avro Vulcan delta bomber was displayed a few days after its first flight, along with the giant Saunders-Roe Princess double-decker flying boat powered by ten Proteus turboprops, one month after its maiden flight, but a de Havilland 110 disintegrated and crashed into the spectator area, killing 29 and its two crew. In 1958, the Fairey Rotodyne was the star attraction, with its "tip-jet" powered rotors, transitioning from a helicopter vertical takeoff and hover to autogiro flight, exceeding helicopter speeds.

=== 1960s ===
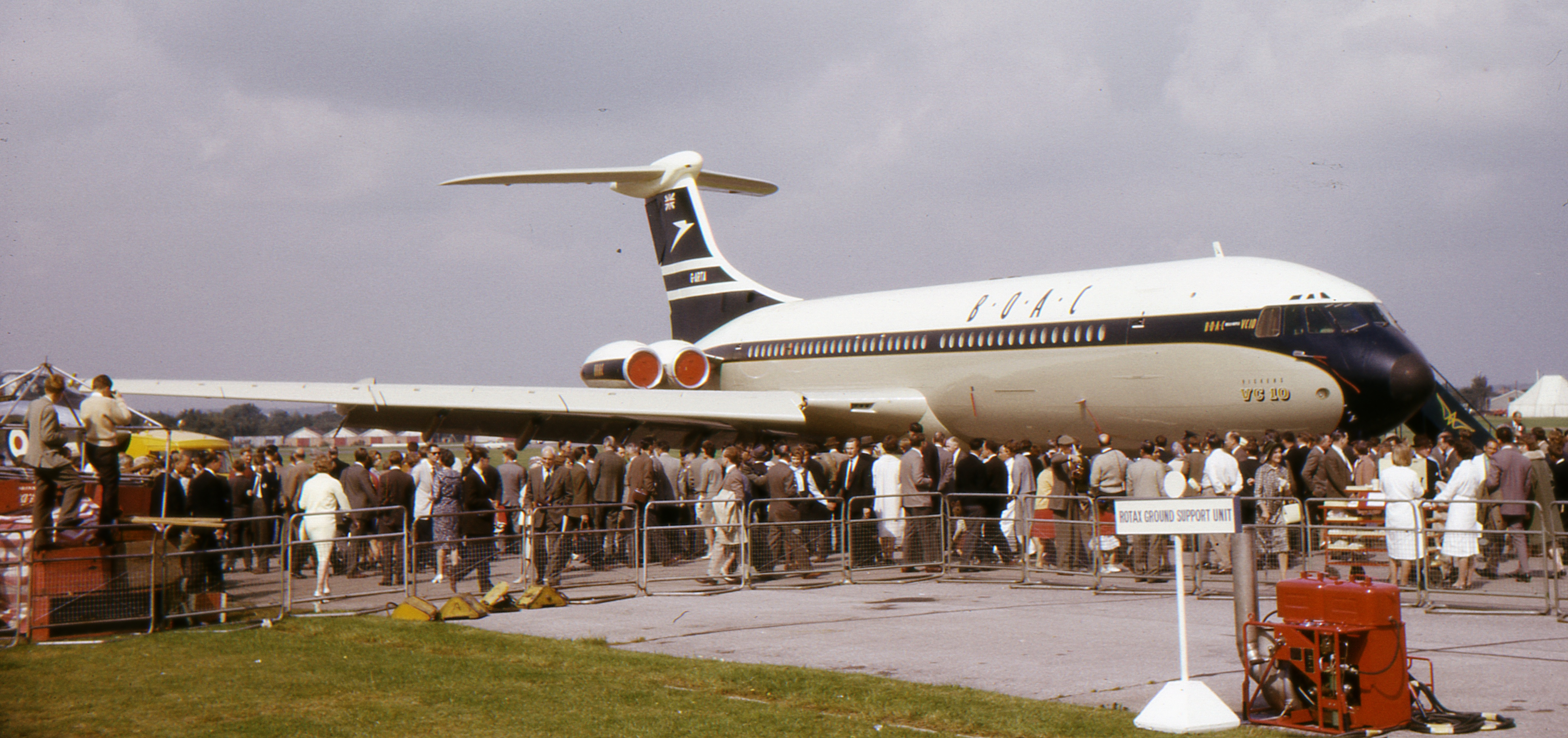
Vickers VC10 prototype in 1962

In 1962, the last time the show was held annually, the Hawker P.1127, the VTOL precursor to the Harrier jump jet, made its debut, along with the corporate de Havilland DH.125 Jet Dragon, and the de Havilland Comet 4C, de Havilland Trident, BAC 1-11 and Vickers VC10 airliners. From 1966, foreign aircraft were allowed if they had British major components, such as the Rolls-Royce-powered Aermacchi MB-326 trainer and Fokker F27 turboprop airliner. Also, the Red Arrows, the RAF aerobatic display team, debuted their Hawker Siddeley Gnats.

=== 1970s ===
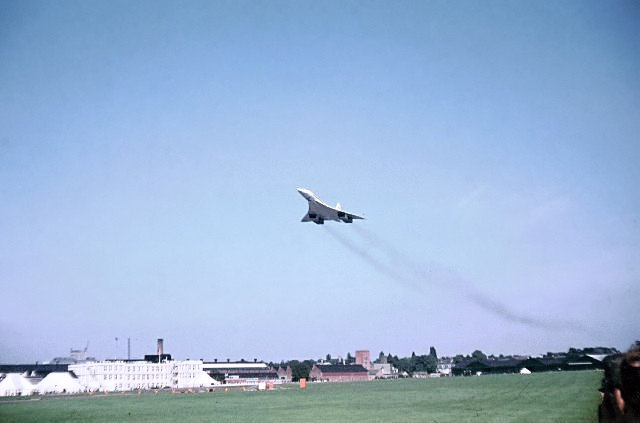
Concorde in 1970

In 1970, Concorde was shown after it had begun flight-testing the year before. The double-delta Saab Viggen debuted in 1972 along with the Lockheed TriStar trijet widebody, powered by Rolls-Royce RB211s, in national British carrier BEA colours. The Mach 3 Lockheed SR-71 Blackbird, and the C-5 Galaxy military airlifter, were shown in 1974. In 1978, the CASA C-101 was flown in the airshow after flight-testing earlier that same year.

=== 1980s ===
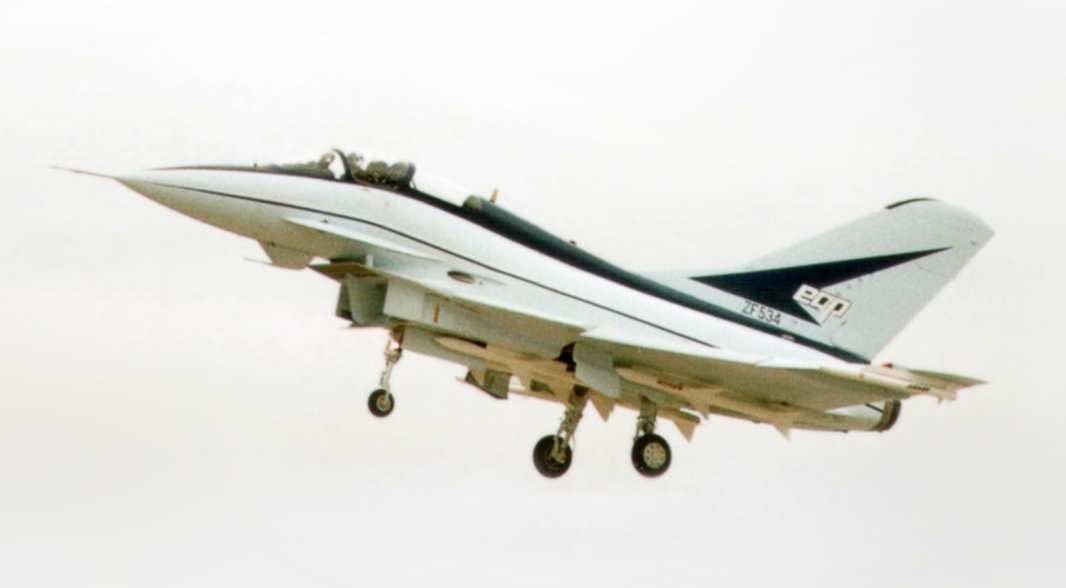
BAe EAP demonstrator in 1986

In 1982, the civil aviation transatlantic rivalry was exemplified by the European Airbus A310 against the American Boeing 767 widebody twinjets, along with its narrowbody sibling, the Boeing 757, while the Rockwell B-1 large swing-wing bomber was the main military interest. In 1984, to demonstrate its short landing capability, a de Havilland Canada Buffalo made a steep descent but hit the runway, collapsed its landing gear and broke its main wing spar without a tragic outcome. At the 1986 show were demonstrated the BAe EAP, the Eurofighter predecessor, and Dassault Rafale rival fighters, as an A300 fly-by-wire testbed flying at very high angles of attack showing the wind-shear stall protection capabilities, later equipping the A320. In 1988, the GE36 propfan-powered McDonnell Douglas MD-80 was demonstrated as a precursor for the MD-94X but propfan airliners remain elusive, while the Soviet Union brought the giant Antonov An-124 Ruslan airlifter and two MiG-29 fighters.

=== 1990s ===
The Eurofighter made its debut in 1996 in an air display showing its airborne capabilities. The Antonov An-225 Mriya also took flight in 1990.

=== 2000s ===
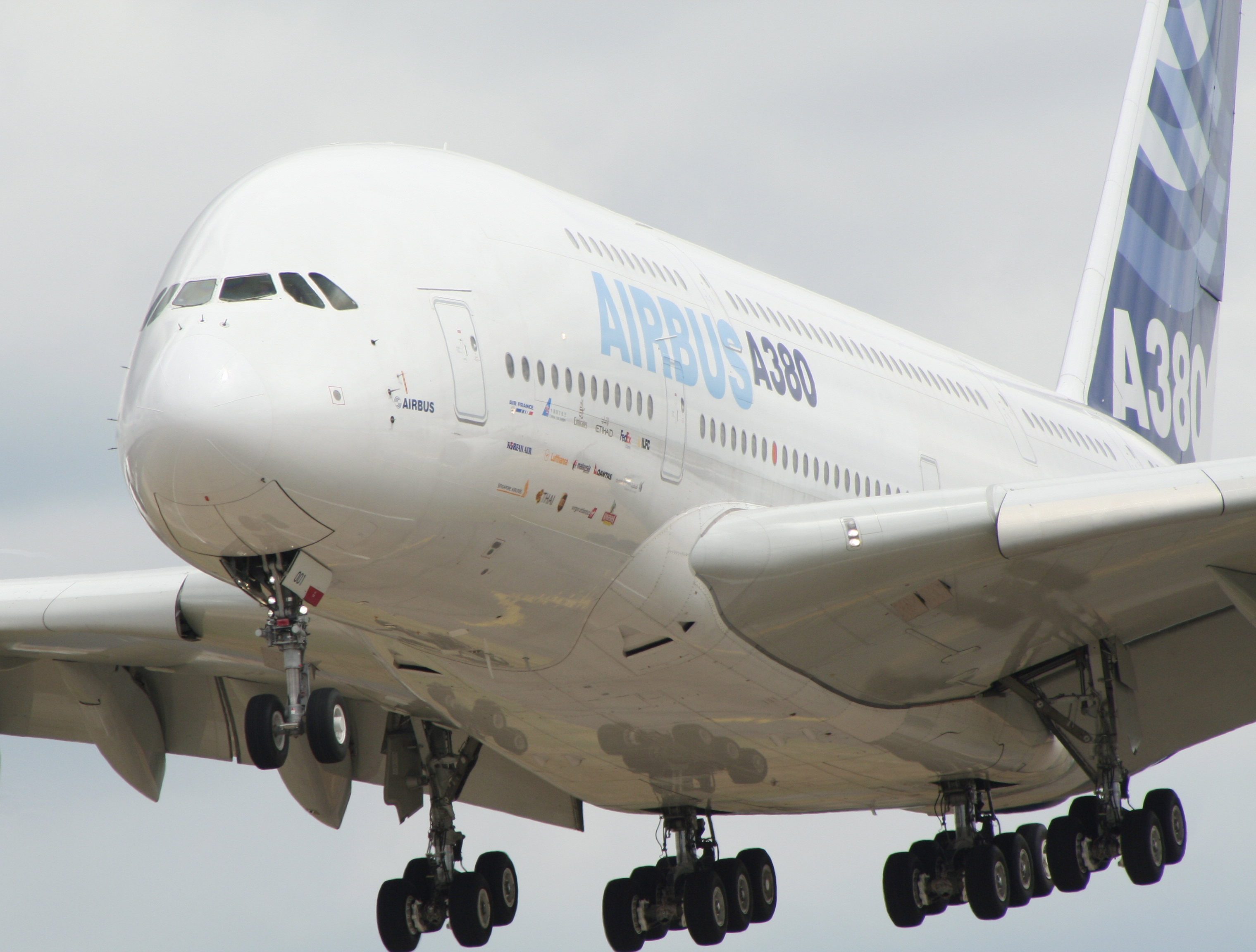
The Airbus A380 at Farnborough in 2006

The biggest passenger aircraft to ever appear at Farnborough, the Airbus A380 debuted with a flypast in 2006 while in the midst of its flight-test programme.

=== 2010s ===
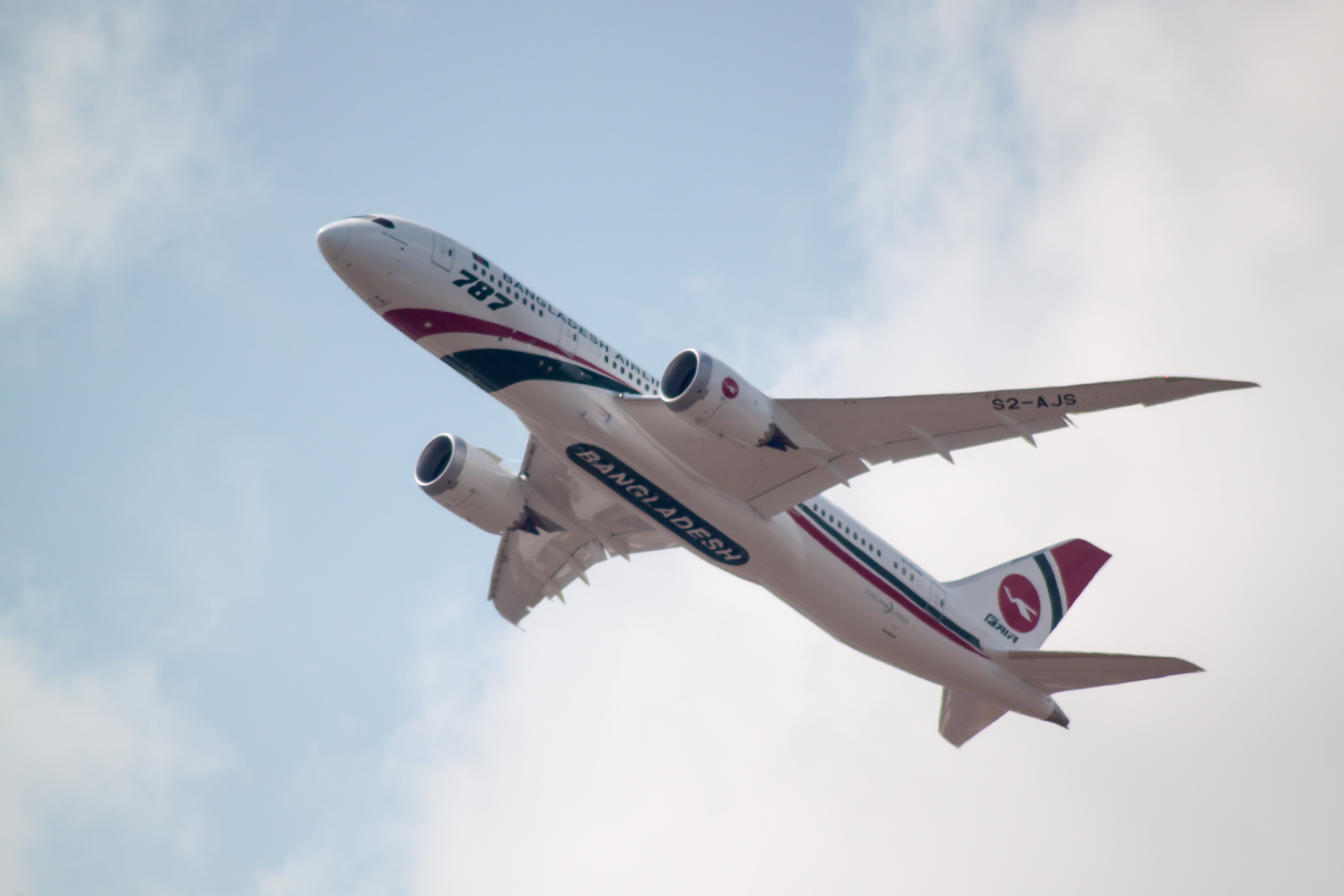
Boeing 787 Dreamliner in 2018

In 2012, a Boeing 787 Dreamliner from Qatar Airways was in flying display, after a Boeing absence for 13 air shows. The Lockheed Martin F-35 Lightning II made its show debut in 2016, two years later than planned, with UK's first F-35B and two US Marine Corps examples. In 2018, the UK Ministry of Defence unveiled a full-scale Tempest model for its Future Combat Air strategy, as the Mitsubishi MRJ regional jet made its first flying display.

==== End of the Public Show ====
In March 2019 it was announced that the public flying days at the airshow would not continue. "Negative and vitriolic feedback" following the 2018 airshow, falling visitor numbers and tighter regulations introduced in the wake of the crash at Shoreham – which made it impossible for exhibitors such as the Red Arrows to perform aerobatics close to populated areas – were given as factors that contributed towards the decision. Farnborough would be a five-day trade show, with public admittance on the Friday only.

=== 2020s ===
The 2020 Farnborough Airshow was to take place on 20 to 24 July 2020, but it was cancelled for the first time in its 72-year history because of the COVID-19 pandemic.In 2026, featured was a Vertical Aerospace VA-1X, planning to be one of the first flying taxis to take off in the UK. The opening ceremony was cancelled for the first time in its history due to the Prime Minister Andy Burnham declining the Invitation

== Accidents ==
On 6 September 1952, a DH.110 jet fighter disintegrated in flight and crashed into the airshow audience, killing 29 spectators and its pilot John Derry and navigator Tony Richards. The worst airshow accident in the UK, it led to new safety procedures at British air displays.

On 13 September 1964, a Bristol Bulldog G-ABBB, marked (incorrectly) as K2227 and owned by the Shuttleworth Trust, crashed while performing a loop. The pilot was only slightly hurt.

On 20 September 1968, a French Air Force Breguet Atlantic crashed into the offices of the Royal Aircraft Establishment (RAE) while performing a display at the air show. One of the RAE's civilian maintenance staff was killed, as were all five members of the crew.

On 11 September 1970, a Wallis WA-117 autogyro G-AXAR crashed, killing the pilot, J.W.C. Judge.

On 1 September 1974, the Sikorsky S-67 Blackhawk helicopter prototype crashed on the runway after a low roll, killing both crew.

On 4 September 1984, a de Havilland Canada DHC-5D Buffalo crashed on the runway, with no casualties, after a badly judged steep approach to an intended short landing in a gusting crosswind.

== See also ==
- List of air shows
