= New Shoreham =

New Shoreham may refer to:

- New Shoreham, Rhode Island, United States
- Part of Shoreham-by-Sea, West Sussex, England
  - New Shoreham (UK Parliament constituency) 1295–1885

== See also ==
- Shoreham (disambiguation)
