= Shoreham Airshow =

Airshow in Sussex, England

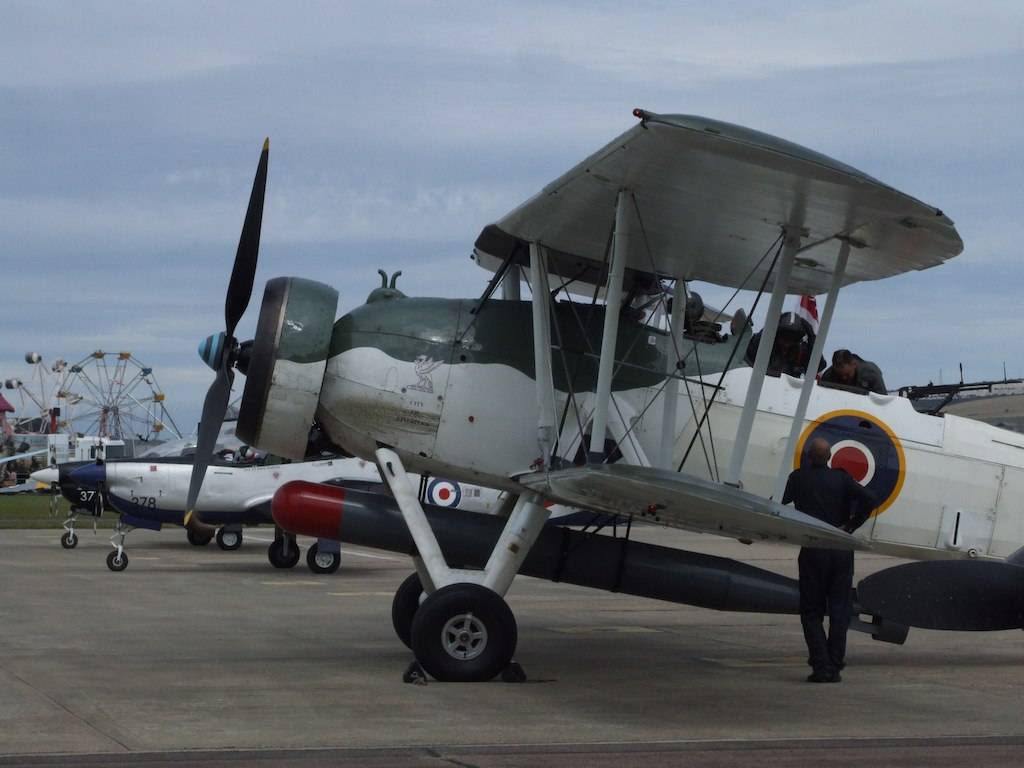
- Fairey Swordfish torpedo bomber at 2011 show
- Status: Permanently ended
- Genre: Airshow
- Date: August or September
- Frequency: Annually
- Venue: Shoreham Airport
- Locations: Lancing, West Sussex and surrounding airspace
- Country: England
- Inaugurated: 1989
- Patron: Royal Air Forces Association
- Organiser: Royal Air Forces Association
- Website: shorehamairshow.co.uk

The Shoreham Airshow, officially known as the Royal Air Forces Association Shoreham Airshow, was an annual airshow and aviation exhibition that took place between 1989 and 2015 at Shoreham Airport (officially known as Brighton City Airport), in West Sussex, England. It was organised by Royal Air Forces Association (RAFA), and held in aid of the RAFA Wings Appeal. The event and featured a mix of military, civilian, and historic aircraft displays along with ground exhibitions and an exposition.

The first event was held in 1989. The airshow raised £2 million for the RAFA.

Following the 2015 Shoreham Airshow crash, the event was discontinued. Prior to its discontinuation in 2015, it was regarded as a prominent airshow on the south coast of England.

== History ==
The airshow was first held in 1989 and was held annually until 2015. The airshow attracted large numbers of spectators and served as a fundraising initiative for the RAFA, supporting its charitable activities for current and former members of the Royal Air Force. It developed into one of the most prominent aviation events on the south coast of England. The Airshow developed into a significant regional aviation event. The event was discontinued following the 2015 accident.

Held annually, the airshow attracted large numbers of spectators and served as a fundraising initiative for the Royal Air Forces Association, supporting its charitable activities for current and former members of the Royal Air Force.

The Airshow featured a programme of aerial performances, including aerobatic displays, flypasts, and demonstrations of historic aircraft. Aircraft displayed at the event included historic military aircraft and jet aircraft, reflecting a focus on aviation and military heritage.

== Location and venue ==
The airshow took place at Shoreham Airport, located between Brighton and Worthing on the south coast of England. The airfield’s configuration enabled aerial displays over both land and coastal areas.

Designated spectator zones were established around the airport perimeter. However, the proximity of the A27 road and surrounding infrastructure meant that display areas were relatively close to public spaces, a factor later examined in safety investigations.

== 2015 accident ==
On 22 August 2015, a Hawker Hunter T7 participating in the air display crashed during a manoeuvre, resulting in eleven fatalities on the ground.

According to the Air Accidents Investigation Branch, the aircraft failed to complete a loop manoeuvre due to insufficient speed and altitude. The incident led to the immediate termination of that year’s event and prompted investigations and regulatory changes.

== Incidents ==
- 15 September 2007: a Second World War vintage Hawker Hurricane fighter aircraft involved in the RAFA Air Display crashed near Lancing College. The pilot, Brian Brown, was killed in the crash, the first fatality in the history of the airshow. The next year's show featured a special tribute to Brown.
- 22 August 2010: a Swift S-1 aerobatic glider stalled during its final low-level turn to land and crashed onto the runway. The pilot suffered three broken vertebrae.
- 22 August 2015: a Hawker Hunter aircraft crashed outside the aerodrome boundary while displaying in the 2015 air show. Eleven people were killed.
