= Brighton City Airport =

Airport in England

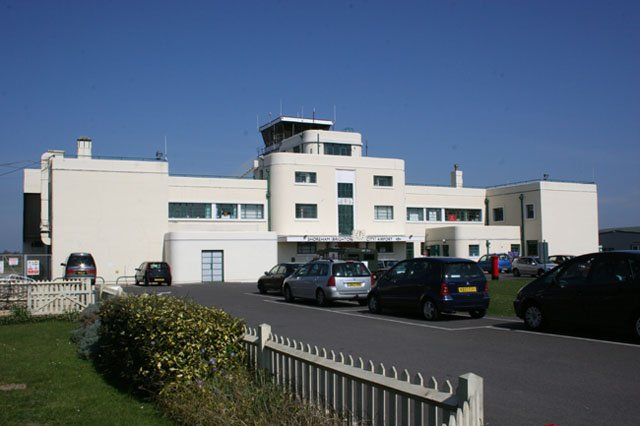
- IATA: ESH; ICAO: EGKA

Summary
- Airport type: Public
- Owner: Brighton & Hove City Council
- Operator: Cyrrus Holdings Limited
- Serves: South East England
- Location: Lancing, West Sussex, England
- Opened: 1911
- Elevation AMSL: 7 ft (2.1 m)
- Coordinates: 50°50′08″N 000°17′50″W
- Website: flybrighton.com

Map
- Location in West Sussex

Runways
Direction	Length		Surface
Direction	m	ft	Surface
02/20	1,036	3,399	Asphalt
06/24	548	1,798	Grass
13/31	408	1,339	Grass
02/20; Unlicensed	700	2,297	Grass

Statistics (2018)
- Passengers: –
- Movements: 39,224
- Sources: UK AIP at NATS; Statistics from the UK Civil Aviation Authority

Brighton City Airport (IATA: ESH, ICAO: EGKA), also commonly known as Shoreham Airport, is located in Lancing near Shoreham by Sea in West Sussex, England. It has a CAA Public Use Aerodrome Licence that allows flights for the public transport of passengers or for flying instruction.

It is the oldest airport in the UK and the oldest purpose-built commercial airport in the world still in operation. The first flight from the site took place in 1910 and the airport officially opened in 1911. It is now owned by Brighton City Airport Ltd (BCAL). The 1930s Art Deco terminal building designed by R Stavers Hessell Tiltman is listed grade II*. The airport is 1 NM (1.9 km; 1.2 mi) west of Shoreham-by-Sea at Lancing in the Adur district of West Sussex. It is situated immediately to the south of the A27 road, between Brighton and Worthing, and immediately to the north of the West Coastway railway line.

== History ==
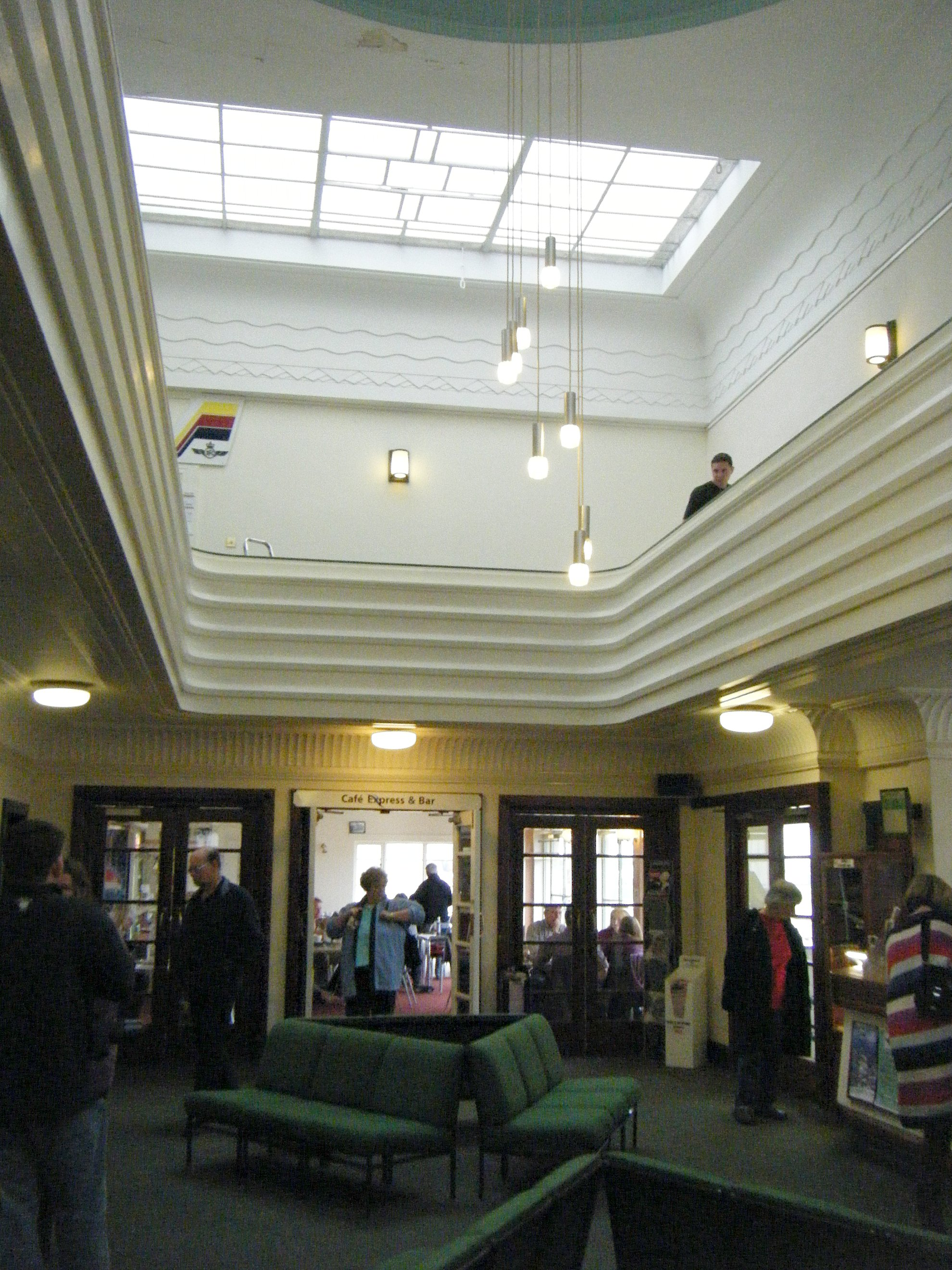
Interior of the terminal building

View of Runway 02 from the West Coastway railway line

=== Foundation ===
The first aviator to fly there was Harold H. Piffard in 1910; a memorial garden celebrates his flight. The aerodrome was officially opened on 20 June 1911. The first flying school opened in 1913.

=== First World War ===
During the First World War the aerodrome was used by the Royal Flying Corps. It was the departure point for some of the earlier flights, using Blériots and BEs, to join the conflict across the Channel.

=== Inter-war period ===
The aerodrome became an airport for the adjacent towns of Brighton, Hove and Worthing. It was officially opened on 13 June 1936 under the name Brighton Hove and Worthing Joint Municipal Airport. The new terminal building was built in 1936 and was designed by Stavers Tiltman in the Art Deco style. The terminal building is still in use and was designated a Grade II* listed building in 1984.

In 1937 one of the local flying schools received a contract to train pilots for the Royal Air Force and was known as No. 16 Elementary and Reserve Flying Training School initially using the de Havilland Tiger Moth which were later supplemented by the use of the Hawker Hart and Hind. With the start of the Second World War imminent, the training school moved away from Shoreham in August 1939.

=== Second World War ===
The airfield started the Second World War in civilian hands until a detachment of Westland Lysanders of 225 Squadron arrived in July 1940 to undertake coastal patrols. With the nearby RAF Tangmere damaged by air raids the Fighter Interception Unit with the Bristol Beaufighter moved to Shoreham although they had problems with the grass runway. In October 1940 422 Flight arrived with the Hawker Hurricane operating as night-fighters. By October 1941 both units had moved away from Shoreham.

The airfield was regularly attacked during July and August 1941 and the next unit to arrive was No 11 Group Target Towing Flight in October 1941. Westland Lysanders were used to tow targets for fighter squadrons to practice air-firing. Lysanders and later the Supermarine Walrus were also based for search and rescue duties. In December 1941 a detachment of Hawker Hurricane fighters from 245 Squadron arrived at Shoreham to support the Tangmere-based squadrons. By August 1941 the fighters had moved on and only the 277 Squadron remained in the search and rescue; the Lysanders were replaced by the Boulton Paul Defiants in May 1942.

- Air Sea Rescue Flight RAF, Shoreham/Friston/Shoreham (1941) became 'C' Flight, No. 277 Squadron RAF

In February 1943 the Defiants were replaced by Supermarine Spitfires and in April 1943 the airfield became a practice camp for RAF Regiment gunners in the anti-aircraft role. Lysanders appeared again but this time to tow targets for the regiment's gunners. A gunnery training dome built on the northern perimeter of the airfield is still there.

In April 1944 No. 345 (Free French) Squadron arrived with Spitfires to support the preparations for the Normandy invasion; the squadron was active on D-Day over the beaches and escorting glider formations. No 345 Squadron moved out in August 1944 and 277 Squadron in October 1944 and the airfield went into care and maintenance and was little used for the rest of the war.

The airfield was bombed several times and a Messerschmitt Bf 109 was shot down by ground fire during one such attack, crash-landing near the terminal building.

A B-17 Flying Fortress crash-landed at the airfield after being damaged during a raid on Germany. The consequent damage to the old guardhouse on the north side of the airfield can still be seen.

=== Post-Second World War ===
The landing area was entirely grass until a tarmac runway was built in 1982.

In 1949, F G Miles Engineering Ltd moved to Shoreham from Redhill Aerodrome and soon occupied the repaired Municipal Hangar.

Beagle Aircraft Ltd (British Executive & General Aviation Ltd) was formed at Shoreham on 7 October 1960 and design drawings were begun a few weeks later for a new prototype twin-engine light transport aircraft. Built as the Beagle B.206X at Beagle's Rearsby factory near Leicester, this promising new type was completed at Shoreham and first flown by John Nicolson on 15 August 1961. Beagle Aircraft Ltd was nationalised in late 1966 and taken over by the British Motor Corporation but later entered receivership in late 1969 and soon closed down.

In 2006, due to mounting debts the airport was sold by the local authority to a property company on a 150-year lease. It was intended that the airport would provide increasing commercial flight activity for the conurbation on the coast nearby, particularly the city of Brighton & Hove.

The pre-war municipal hangar was listed Grade II in July 2007.

=== Present ===
The airport is used by privately owned light aeroplanes, flying schools, and for light aircraft and helicopter maintenance and sales. A number of operators provide flying lessons, sight-seeing and pleasure flights, including the experience of flying in a Tiger Moth World War II training aircraft.

On 2 May 2014, Brighton City Airport Ltd (BCAL) acquired a lease and took ownership of its operations, which at the time was named Shoreham Airport, taking over from Albemarle. Once the takeover was completed, the airport was officially renamed as Brighton City (Shoreham) Airport.

In August 2019 Cyrrus acquired a 25-year lease from Brighton & Hove City Council to operate the airport

=== Wild Life Festival ===
Annually between 2015 and 2017, Wild Life Festival, a live music event developed by Disclosure and Rudimental was held at Brighton City Airport.

== RAFA Shoreham Airshow ==
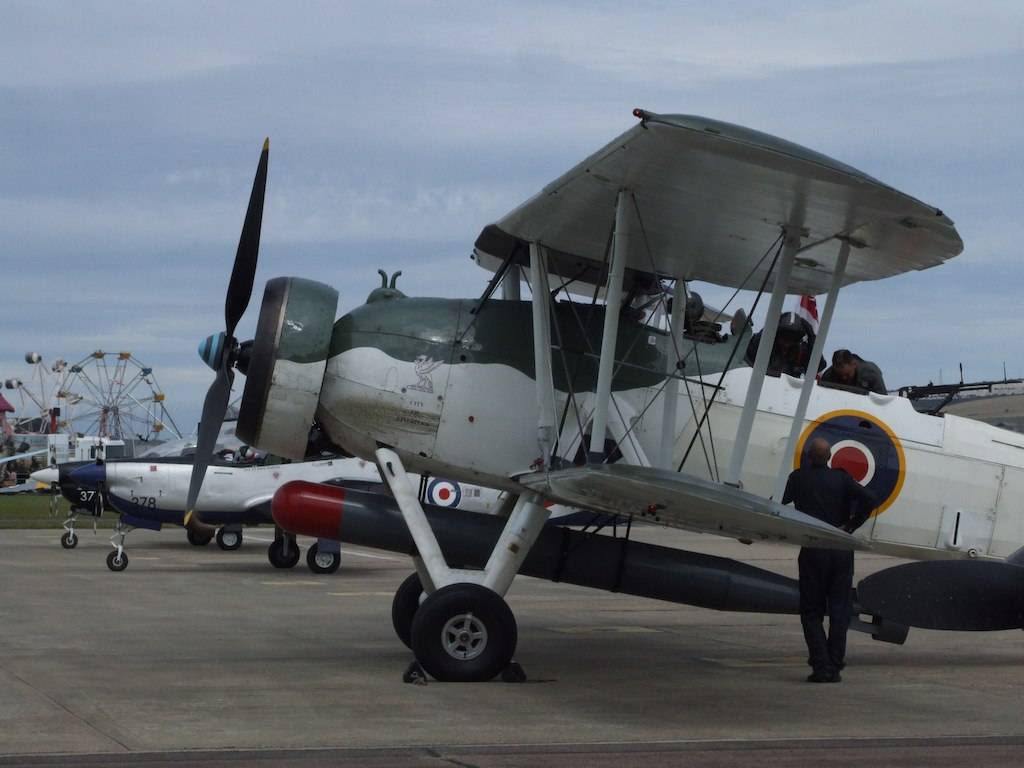
Fairey Swordfish torpedo bomber at 2011 airshow.

The airport hosted the Royal Air Forces Association (RAFA) Shoreham Airshow for around 25 years. On 22 August 2015, a Hawker Hunter jet fighter taking part in the airshow crashed onto the A27 road just outside Brighton City Airport, killing 11 people, and the show has not been held since.

== Facilities ==
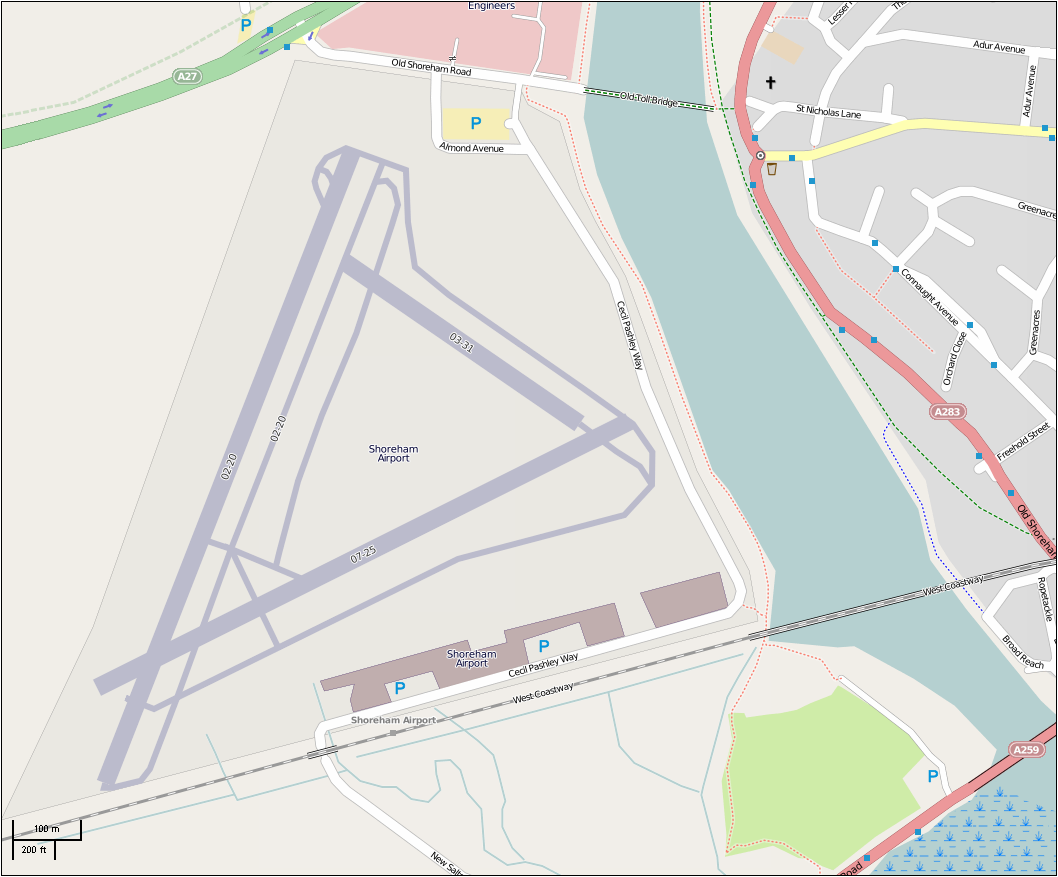
Brighton City Airport

There is one terminal building at the airport, together with flight indicator boards announcing all arrivals and departures, a live runway camera and a licensed restaurant called The Hummingbird Restaurant and Cafe. The airport houses Northbrook College's engineering dedepartment, a Centre of Vocational Excellence (CoVE) in Aerospace and Aviation. A number of aerospace and aviation and non-aviation commercial businesses have offices and workshops on the airport site and along the perimeter road.

The visitor centre features exhibits about the airport's history and area aviation history, a library and archive of related historic materials and guided tours of the airport.

== Ground transport ==
The airport is served by Shoreham-by-Sea station on the West Coastway Line, 1 mile (1.6 km) distant. A halt, Bungalow Town Halt, had been opened in 1910, just in front of the main building. In 1935, its name was changed to Shoreham Airport. The station was closed on 15 July 1940.

== Airlines and destinations ==
Various air taxi companies are based at the airport. Brighton City Airways operated out of the airport to Paris Pontoise airport but ceased operations in 2013 after encountering problems setting up a point of entry at the French airport.

== South East Air Support Unit ==
The South East Air Support Unit formerly operated from Brighton City Airport. Previously Sussex Police Air Operations Unit, the unit moved in summer 2007 to Dunsfold Park, west of Gatwick Airport, before moving to its present base at Redhill Aerodrome in autumn 2013.

== Shoreham Airport RFFS ==
The Shoreham Airport Rescue and Firefighting Service provides a professional fire-fighting capability at the airport during operating hours. Headed by a senior airport fire officer, the service's two watches (Blue Watch and Red Watch) man two fire appliances. The service has operated at the airport continuously for over 90 years.

Brighton City Airport's aircraft fuelling service is operated as a department of the Rescue and Firefighting Service. There are three large mobile fuel bowsers for delivering both avgas and jet fuel to aircraft, including a service (accompanied by fire appliances) for fast delivery of fuel to police and coastguard emergency helicopters without disengaging their engines. Fuel technicians are attached to the firefighting watches and work the same shift pattern

== Film appearances ==
Due to its listed period facilities and art deco main building, Brighton City Airport has been used by film-makers seeking to portray a small town airport, or also for historical reconstructions of airport scenes from the 1930s onwards. It was used in 1984 to film scenes set at Singapore Airport for the series Tenko.

The airport has appeared in the Netflix TV series The Crown and three episodes of Agatha Christie's Poirot ("The Adventure of the Western Star", "Death in the Clouds" and "Lord Edgware Dies"). External shots of the airport were also used in the films The Da Vinci Code and Woman in Gold. The airport was used in the feature-length documentary Angel Without Wings and A Dark Reflection.

== Sources ==
- Brooks, Robin J. (1996). Sussex Airfields in the Second World War. Newbury, Berkshire, England: Countryside Books. ISBN 1-85306-259-6.
- Lake, A (1999). Flying units of the RAF. Shrewsbury: Airlife. ISBN 1-84037-086-6.
