= 2015 Shoreham Airshow crash =

2015 aviation accident in England

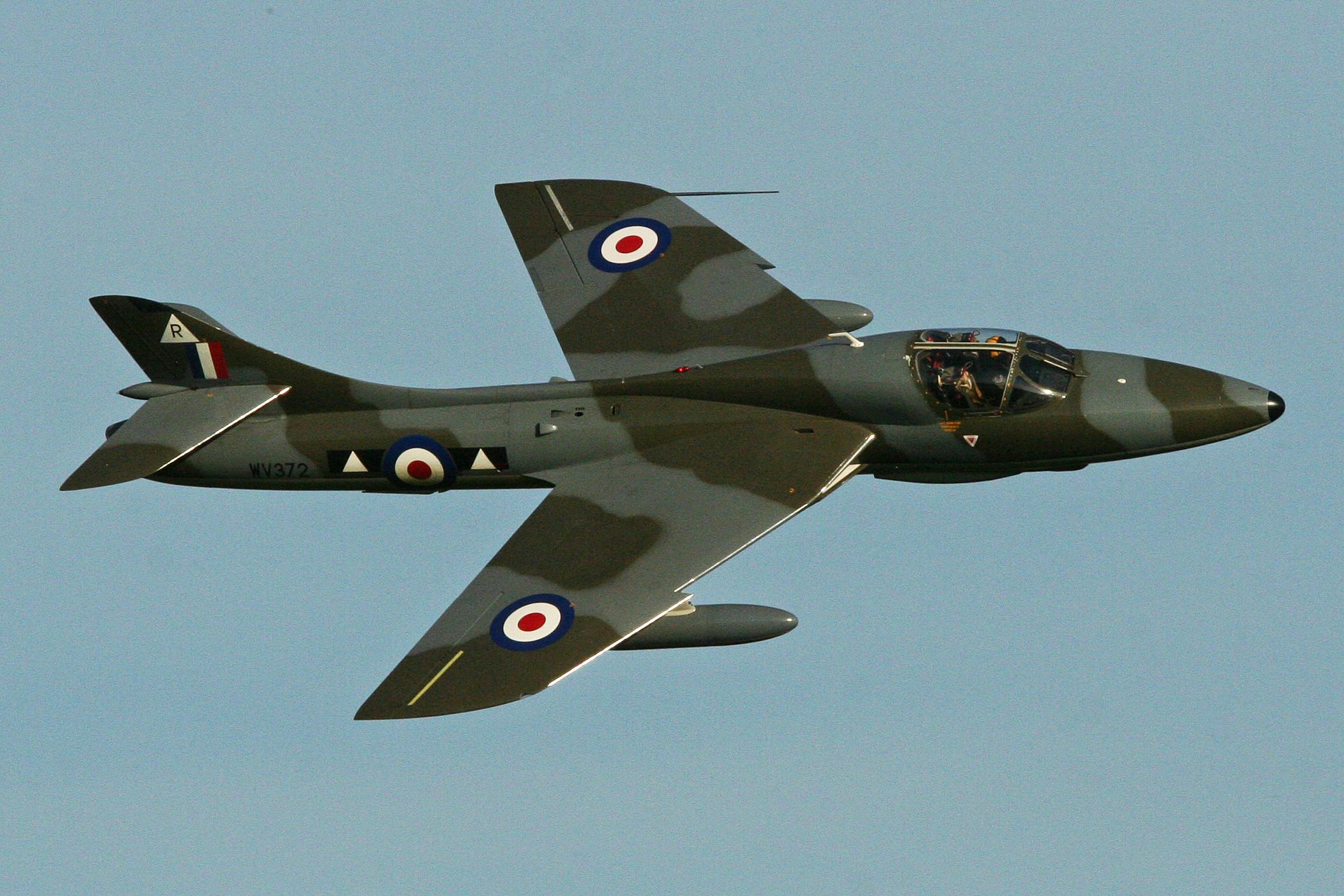
- G-BXFI, the aircraft involved in the accident, photographed in 2013

Accident
- Date: 22 August 2015
- Summary: Pilot error during aerobatic manoeuvre
- Site: A27 road, Shoreham Airport boundary, Lancing, West Sussex, UK; 50.8417°N 0.2952°W
- Total fatalities: 11
- Total injuries: 16

Aircraft
- Aircraft type: Hawker Hunter T7
- Operator: Canfield Hunter Limited
- Registration: G-BXFI
- Flight origin: North Weald Airfield, Essex, United Kingdom
- Destination: North Weald Airfield
- Occupants: 1
- Crew: 1
- Fatalities: 0
- Injuries: 1
- Survivors: 1

Ground casualties
- Ground fatalities: 11
- Ground injuries: 15

On 22 August 2015, a Hawker Hunter T7 aircraft crashed onto a main road during an aerial display at the Shoreham Airshow at Shoreham Airport, England, killing 11 people and injuring 16 others. It was the deadliest air show accident in the United Kingdom since the 1952 Farnborough Airshow crash, which killed 31 people.

The aircraft failed to complete a loop manoeuvre and crashed, hitting vehicles on the A27 road adjacent to the airport. The pilot, Andy Hill, was critically injured but survived. All civilian-registered Hawker Hunter aircraft in the United Kingdom were grounded, and restrictions were put in place on civilian vintage jet aircraft displays over land, limiting them to high-level flypasts and banning aerobatic manoeuvres.

The investigation by the Air Accidents Investigation Branch concluded that the crash resulted from pilot error. In 2018, Hill was charged with eleven counts of manslaughter by gross negligence and one count of endangering an aircraft. He was found not guilty on all counts on 8 March 2019. The organisers of the Shoreham Airshow denied any responsibility for the crash.

An inquest into the deaths of the victims was scheduled to be held in 2020, but was delayed due to the COVID-19 pandemic until 30 November 2022, pending the outcome of some procedural issues. In December 2022, the coroner found that the victims were unlawfully killed as their deaths were caused by an incorrect manoeuvre and a series of gross errors. Hill's final appeal for review of the decision not to reinstate his flying licences was denied in May 2025.

After the crash, regulations for airshows were significantly tightened by the Civil Aviation Authority (CAA), increasing costs to organisers to fund the new safety measures to a degree that led to the cancellation of later shows.

== Aircraft and crew ==
The crash site in Lancing, West Sussex, UK

The aircraft was a 1950s two-seat Hawker Hunter T7, registration G-BXFI serial 41H-670815, displaying its former military serial number WV372 as part of its livery. Having first flown for the Royal Air Force (RAF) in July 1955, it was rebuilt following a fire, returning to service in 1959 after conversion to T7 specification. It had been making civilian display flights as a warbird since 1998, under a variety of owners. At the time of the accident, it was owned by Graham Peacock, and based at North Weald Airfield, Essex. The aircraft had flown to Shoreham Airport from North Weald and was scheduled to return there after the display.

Andy Hill, the 51-year-old pilot, was described by colleagues as experienced, with more than 12,000 flight hours. He had worked as a captain at British Airways. He had flown Hawker Siddeley Harriers and worked as an instructor for the RAF before joining the airline. As well as the Hawker Hunter, he flew a Van's RV-8 and a BAC Jet Provost at airshows.

== Airshow ==
The aircraft was taking part in the first day of the two-day Shoreham Airshow, held in aid of the Royal Air Forces Association. The conditions were hot and sunny, with a crosswind up to 15 knots, described as not unusual for this coastal location by the local media. The Hunter had been opening the afternoon session of displays; the morning programme up to 12:30 BST (11:30 UTC) had already featured The Blades aerobatic team (opening), Justyn Gorman Aerobatics, an AutoGyro Calidus, the Tiger 9 Aeronautical Display Team (six aircraft only), a Pitts Special, The Twister aerobatic team (one aircraft only), an RAF Tutor, and the RAF Falcons parachute display team.

== Accident ==
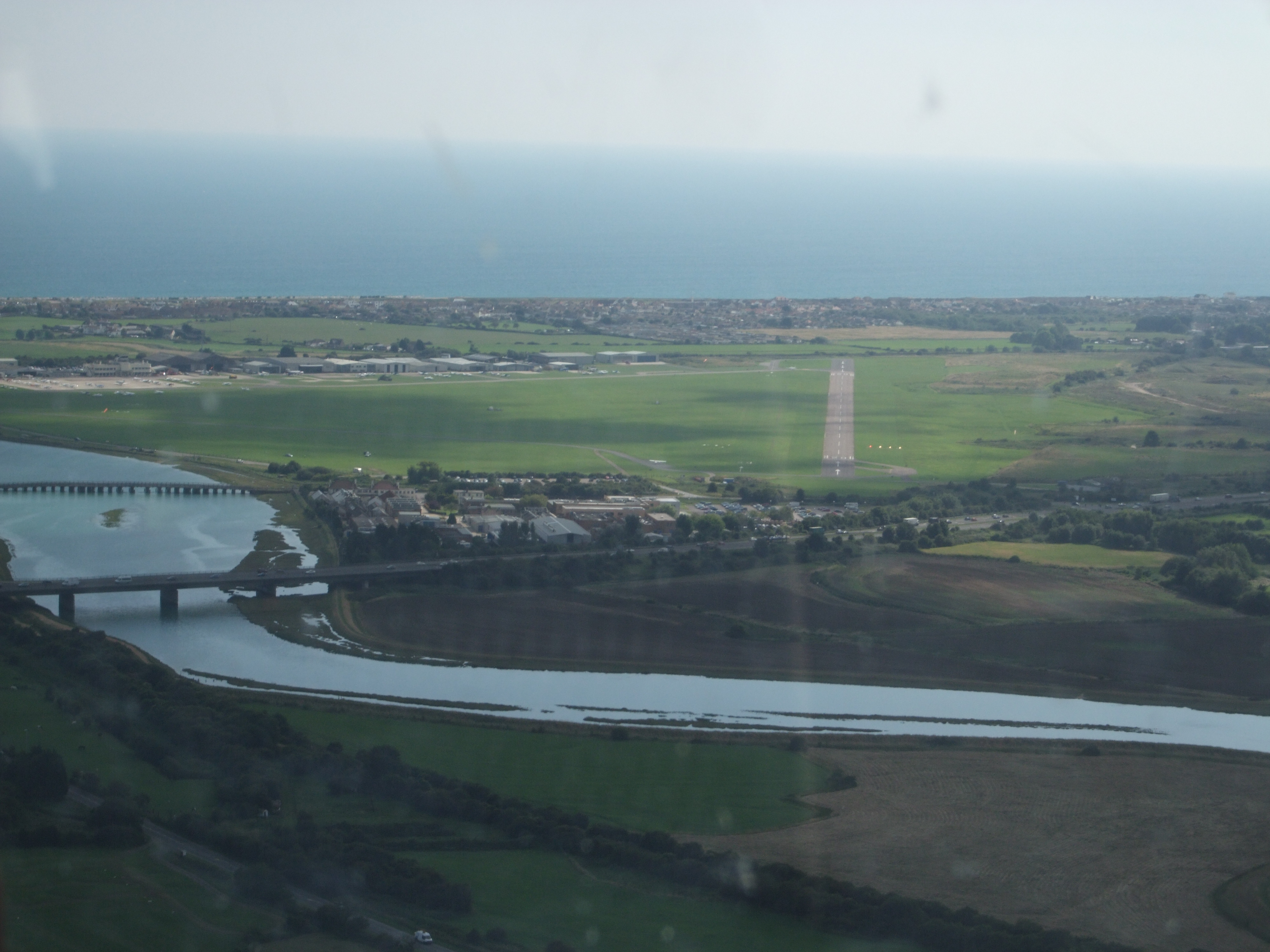
Aerial view looking south-west towards Shoreham airport. The aircraft hit the A27 dual-carriageway between the River Adur, in the foreground, and the runway.

=== Crash ===
The Hunter commenced its display with a low pass along the runway from south to north, turning for a second pass in the opposite direction. As it neared the airport, it pulled up into an inside loop. This manoeuvre started from a height of 200 feet (60 m), which leading aviation expert David Learmount later said "left no room for misjudgement". The loop should have been started at a height of 500 feet (150 m) and a speed of at least 350 knots (650 km/h), attaining a height of 4,000 feet (1,200 m) and 150 knots (280 km/h) at the top of the loop. Only 2,700 feet (820 m) and 105 knots (194 km/h) were achieved from an initial entry speed of 310 knots (570 km/h).

Before it could complete the loop, the aircraft crashed in a nose-high attitude onto the west-bound carriageway of the A27 road. The aircraft broke into four parts on impact: cockpit, left wing and main body, tail, and right wing, destroying several cars in the process. Fuel escaping from the fuel tanks ignited in a large fireball and plume of smoke immediately following the impact. The crash occurred at 13:22 BST (12:22 UTC). The first fire appliance arrived at the scene within 90 seconds of the crash. Footage of the accident was captured by spectators, as well as a dashcam mounted in a car that was travelling towards the crash site.

=== Casualties ===
Eleven people on the ground were killed and sixteen others were injured. Those confirmed dead included two players from Worthing United F.C. Eight vehicles were destroyed in the crash, including a Daimler DS420 limousine which was en route to collect a bride to transport her to church for her wedding. The driver of the Daimler was one of the fatalities.

The aircraft had departed from North Weald with its ejector seat in a live condition. Hill was thrown clear of the aircraft still strapped into the live seat, which posed an additional danger to rescuers. He survived the crash with serious injuries, and was flown to the Royal Sussex County Hospital in nearby Brighton; his condition was described as critical and he was said to be fighting for his life. He was subsequently placed in a medically-induced coma. He was released from hospital in September 2015.

After a thorough area search of the crash site, all the recovered components of the aircraft were taken to the Air Accidents Investigation Branch (AAIB) facility at Farnborough, Hampshire, for examination.

=== Response ===
A de Havilland Sea Vixen was already airborne ready to perform the next display after the Hunter; instead it flew overhead at altitude and departed to the north. With an Avro Vulcan due half an hour later at 14:05, it was decided to let it perform a tribute flypast, after which the show was closed. All of the aircraft at the airport were already grounded due to the lack of fire cover and the creation of an exclusion zone around the accident site.

Following the crash, the A27 was closed in both directions, requiring those attending to exit via a height restricted route, through the industrial estate of the airport to the A259. People were initially required to remain at the airport due to the requirement to collect evidence and witness statements. Those at the airport were initially only allowed to exit on the A27 side via the A27 footpaths. A West Sussex Fire and Rescue Service appliance was first on scene, closely followed by the airport emergency vehicles, and medical personnel from the British Red Cross, who were providing medical cover at the airshow. The second day of the air show on 23 August was cancelled. The A27 was partially reopened on 30 August.

Adur District Council (Shoreham Airport is within the Lancing parish of Adur District) set up online and physical books of condolence. Together with West Sussex County Council they also opened a charitable fund to support victims of the accident, to be administered by the Sussex Community Foundation, a registered charity.

In March 2017, Adur District Council announced that a series of sculptures were to be placed along the banks of the River Adur as a memorial. In May 2019, a permanent memorial was erected near the Shoreham Tollbridge.

== Aftermath ==
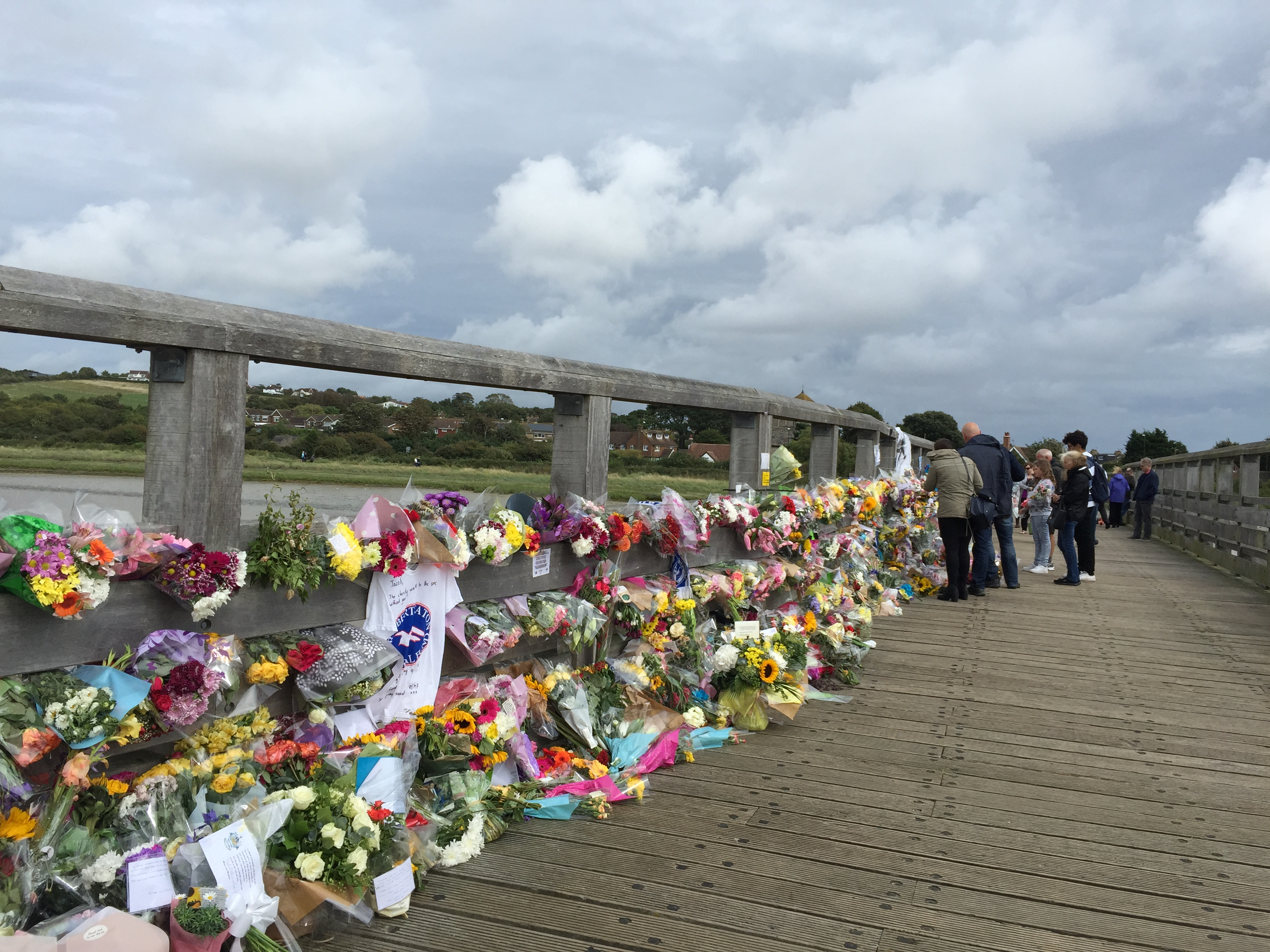
Floral tributes to those who died, on Shoreham Tollbridge near the site of the crash

The airshow at Clacton-on-Sea, Essex, which took place the following weekend, opened with "a pause for thought" for those who died at Shoreham. The Clacton airshow takes place over the sea, similar to the Bournemouth Airshow which took place the same weekend as the accident and ran for both days.

On 24 August 2015, the CAA imposed restrictions on "vintage jet aircraft" performing over land at airshows until further notice, reducing displays to flypasts only. In addition, all Hawker Hunters on the United Kingdom civil aircraft register were grounded until further notice, although military-registered Hunters were not affected. The restrictions were to remain in place until the completion of the investigation into the accident, and a wider review of safety at airshows was to be undertaken by the CAA. In January 2016, the CAA brought in stricter requirements for airshows in the United Kingdom. The grounding of civilian Hunters was lifted on 6 July 2017; however, aircraft would be subject to enhanced maintenance and inspection regimes before a permit to fly would be granted. The ban on Hawker Hunter and other jet aircraft on the United Kingdom civil register performing aerobatic manoeuvres remained in place. On 1 March 2018, the CAA lifted its ban on straight-wing ex-military jet aircraft from performing aerobatics at airshows; a ban on swept-wing aircraft remained in place.

The airshow scheduled to be held at Durham Tees Valley Airport on 29 August 2015 was postponed. Organisers stated that the new regulations in place would have "severely limited" some of the displays of the jet aircraft. The airshow would have been the first in the area since 1989; it took place in 2016.

Other air shows on the following weekend were not postponed but some displays were altered to match the CAA restrictions, including the Wings and Wheels display at Dunsfold Aerodrome where a one-minute silent tribute to the victims was held before the start of the air display.

As of February 2025, no further Shoreham Airshow has taken place or been announced.

The 2016 Llandudno Airshow was cancelled, due to a lack of time to make changes in light of new regulations introduced by the CAA. For the 2016 Farnborough Airshow, the Red Arrows performed a flypast rather than an aerobatic display, stating that the latter would not be appropriate in the aftermath of the Shoreham accident.

In August 2016, it was reported that the aircraft's owners had admitted liability for the accident in late 2015. Two claims for compensation had been settled with a third in the final stages of settlement.

In March 2019 it was announced that the public flying days at the Farnborough Airshow would not continue. "Negative and vitriolic feedback" following the 2018 airshow, falling visitor numbers and tighter regulations introduced in the wake of the crash at Shoreham – which made it impossible for exhibitors such as the Red Arrows to perform aerobatics close to populated areas – were given as factors that contributed towards the decision. Farnborough would be a five-day trade show, with public admittance on the Friday only.

== Investigations ==
=== AAIB ===
The Air Accidents Investigation Branch (AAIB), responsible for investigating civil aviation accidents and incidents in the United Kingdom, sent a team to Shoreham. As a part of the investigation, the AAIB appealed for members of the public to contact them if they had photographs or video of the accident, and received a large number of such recordings from a variety of locations around the airport. The aircraft was not equipped with a cockpit voice recorder or a flight data recorder. The AAIB published an interim report on 4 September. The report stated that "To date, no abnormal indications have been identified. Throughout the flight, the aircraft appeared to be responding to the pilot's control inputs".

A second Special Bulletin was published by the AAIB on 21 December 2015. It revealed that the aircraft was not compliant with its Permit to Fly insofar as the ejection seat cartridges installed in the aircraft had passed their expiry date. The maintenance organisation had ordered new cartridges in January 2014, but they did not arrive until June 2015 (two months before the accident) and the maintainer decided to fit them at the aircraft's next annual inspection in February 2016. The maintainer stated it was acting under the privileges of its maintenance approvals. The CAA was reported to be of the view that the maintainer did not have such privilege.

An issue of compliance with a Mandatory Permit Directive (MPD) in relation to time between engine overhauls raised questions as to whether the aircraft's Permit to Fly was valid on the day that it was issued. The CAA stated that it was unclear whether an Alternative Means of Compliance (AMOC) was in effect at the time for the accident aircraft, which would mean the Permit to Fly was valid. According to the AAIB's second interim report, "On this basis [the CAA] could not determine if the aircraft met the requirements of its Permit to Fly from December 2014 onwards." The second Special Bulletin made seven safety recommendations.

A third update was published on 10 March 2016. This Special Bulletin covered the organisation of the airshow at Shoreham, and airshows in the United Kingdom in general, with particular attention to risk management. Comparison was made with how airshows are organised in Australia, Canada and the United States. British civil and military rules were examined separately. It was reported that at the 2014 Shoreham Airshow, G-BXFI had overflown Lancing with a bank angle in excess of 90°. The pilot had not been instructed to stop his display. The AAIB did not name the pilot of G-BXFI who flew the 2014 display. It was also reported that the Flying Display Director at both displays did not have prior knowledge of the display intended to be flown. The issue of low flying during air displays was investigated. A previous accident involving glider BGA 4665 at an air race in Leicestershire in August 2005 had resulted in a recommendation to the CAA to remove the exemption, enjoyed by aircraft participating in an airshow, from normal low flying rules. This had not been done, despite the CAA agreeing with the recommendation. It was noted that the police had no powers to prevent people from watching an airshow from outside the boundaries of the venue where it was taking place. In the case of Shoreham, neither Sussex Police nor the organisers had asked for such powers. Signs had been put out on the A27 by the airshow organisers stating that "viewing was prohibited and that offenders may be prosecuted". Another issue considered was how often CAA Flight Standards Officers attended airshows: only 1.4% of airshows in 2014 and 7.1% of airshows in 2015 had been attended. Fourteen recommendations were made. In January 2017, the CAA stated that it accepted all the recommendations made by the AAIB.

The final report of the investigation of the accident was published on 3 March 2017. The cause of the accident was found to be pilot error: the pilot failed to recognise that the aircraft was too low to perform the loop. In December 2019, the AAIB issued a supplement to its final report, following additional analysis of the pilot's actions. Additional evidence as to how G-forces may have affected the pilot was examined. The AAIB concluded that the findings in the final report were correct.

=== Sussex Police ===
Sussex Police opened a criminal investigation into the accident. Hill was released from hospital in early September 2015 and was interviewed by police in December. In February 2016, it was announced that the police investigation was being extended to cover an incident at an airshow in Southport, Merseyside, in August 2014. That incident involved a BAC Jet Provost aircraft which had descended too low and got too close to the crowd line whilst being flown by Hill; he was ordered to cease flying the display by the airshow's Flying Display Director. A CAA Flight Standards Officer did not attend that airshow.

Sussex Police applied to the High Court for a disclosure of certain evidence gathered by the AAIB: copies of interviews between the AAIB and Hill, the results of tests carried out by the AAIB and video evidence filmed from inside the aircraft during its display. At the High Court on 28 September 2016, an order was made that the onboard video evidence would be released, but not copies of the interview or the results of tests. They intended to present a file to the CPS before the pre-inquest review on 20 June 2017, but stated then that their investigation was not quite complete. Hill was interviewed again under caution on 1 June 2017. It was reported on 30 November that Sussex Police had sent a file to the CPS, who would decide whether or not any criminal charges would be laid. On 21 March 2018, the CPS announced that Hill had been charged with eleven counts of manslaughter by gross negligence and one count of endangering an aircraft contrary to Article 137 of the Air Navigation Order 2009. Owing to the prosecution, the inquest was postponed until after the trial had concluded.

== Legal ==
=== Criminal trial ===
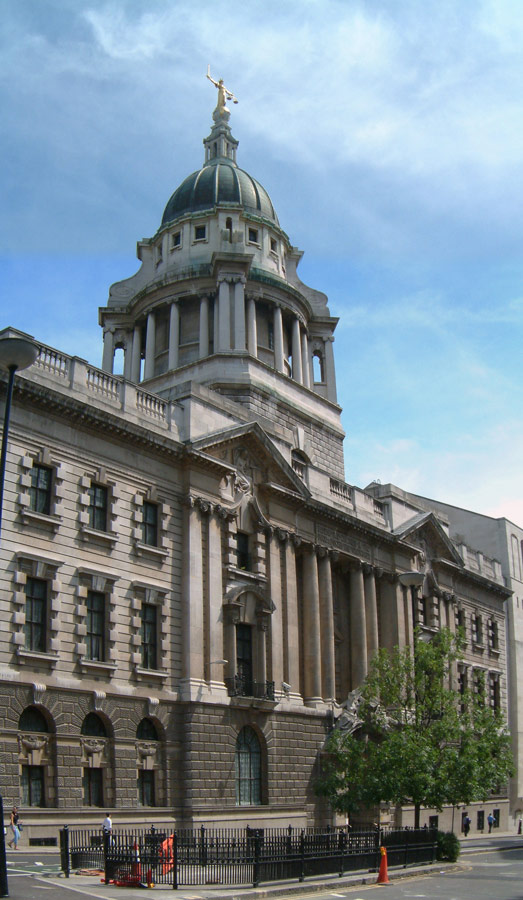
The Old Bailey, London

Proceedings against Hill began at Westminster Magistrates' Court, London, on 19 April 2018. Hill indicated that he would enter pleas of not guilty and was bailed to appear at the Old Bailey on 17 May. The trial there started on 15 May, when Hill pleaded not guilty, and was adjourned until 14 January 2019. Hill was granted bail. A pre-trial review took place on 8 January 2019. Hill indicated that his defence was to be that he had been disabled by g-forces during the flight.

The trial at the Old Bailey resumed as scheduled on 14 January before Mr Justice Edis. On 15 January, a jury of eight women and four men was selected from 56 members of the public, who had passed initial screening. On 17 January, the jury were shown video of the accident that had not been previously released to the media. The prosecution alleged that previous incidents Hill had been involved in showed that he appeared to have a "cavalier attitude" to safety and played "fast and loose" with the rules. On 4 February, the court decamped to Gatwick Aviation Museum, Charlwood, Surrey, which has a Hawker Hunter on display. Jurors were shown the aircraft's controls and the instruments were explained to them. They were given the opportunity to sit in the cockpit of the aircraft and touch the flying controls. Both prosecution and defence provided an expert witness to assist the jury. Hill did not attend the museum.

On 8 March 2019, Hill was found not guilty on each of the 11 counts of manslaughter by gross negligence. The jury reached unanimous decisions on each of the counts following seven hours of deliberation. The judge also formally acquitted Hill on the count of negligently or recklessly endangering the safety of an aircraft, which had not been put to the jury. At the conclusion of the trial, Edis commended the relatives of the victims on the very dignified way they had behaved. Relatives of the victims stated that they were devastated by the verdict. Sussex Police paid tribute to their dignity, adding that they respected the jury's decision. Outside the court after the trial Hill read out the names of all those killed in the incident and said "I am truly sorry for the part I played in their deaths, and it is all I will remember for the rest of my life."

=== Inquest ===
A coroner's inquest was opened on 2 September 2015 in Horsham, West Sussex. After the naming of all the victims and a minute's silence, the inquest was adjourned pending the AAIB and police investigations. At the pre-inquest hearing in June 2017, Sussex Police stated that its investigation was 95% complete. Due to the prosecution of Hill, the inquest was postponed. The date for the inquest, which was scheduled to last for six weeks, was set as September 2020. The inquest would be held without a jury: the senior coroner Penelope Schofield ruled that the public interest can be better served by herself sitting alone. In May 2020, it was announced that the inquest would be postponed until 2021 due to the COVID-19 pandemic and to allow families of the deceased to attend the inquest in person. The inquest was further postponed to a date in 2022.

In February 2022 the High Court refused the coroner access to video footage shot from the cockpit of the aircraft, stating that there "is neither credible evidence nor [...] a credible suggestion that the AAIB investigations were incomplete, flawed or deficient on the issue of cognitive impairment." A wider concern was that allowing the use of the video would hamper investigations into future aviation accidents. Dame Victoria Sharp endorsed a concern that disclosure of protected materials would make witnesses less forthcoming in dealing with the AAIB.

The inquest resumed on 30 November 2022. A request by Hill that a verdict of unlawful killing be ruled out was rejected by the coroner. In December 2022, seven years after the crash, the coroner ruled that the victims were unlawfully killed. The coroner described Hill's flying as "exceptionally bad", and the airshow's safety plan as "not fit for purpose". In February 2023 Hill applied to the High Court of Justice for permission for a judicial review of the inquest, but his application was refused.

=== Licence appeal ===
The CAA suspended Hill's pilot licences following the accident. In early October 2024 he unsuccessfully appealed the suspension. The CAA reported that Hill sought to disassociate himself from the accident, and referred to himself in the third person – Hill's private and airline transport pilot licences and flight radio telephony licence were revoked on the grounds of both competence and fitness of character. Hill applied to the High Court of Justice in March 2025 for permission for a judicial review of his failed appeal to the CAA, although the time limit for the application had already passed. That final appeal was denied in May 2025.

== See also ==
- List of air show accidents and incidents in the 21st century
