= Farnborough International Exhibition & Conference Centre =

Multi-functional venue in Farnborough, England

Coordinates: 51.2782°N 0.7571°W

The Farnborough International Exhibition & Conference Centre is a multi-functional venue located in Farnborough, Hampshire, England. It serves as a location for events, conferences, and exhibitions throughout the year.

== Location ==
The Farnborough International Exhibition & Conference Centre is located in Farnborough, approximately 50 kilometres (31 mi) southwest of London.

== Facilities ==
The Farnborough International Exhibition & Conference Centre includes different facilities to cater to different event requirements:

1. Exhibition Halls: The venue features large exhibition halls customizable for different types of exhibits.
2. 2 Conference Rooms: Several conference rooms are available for meetings, seminars, and presentations. These rooms are equipped with audiovisual technology for communication.
3. Outdoor Display Area: The venue includes an outdoor display area where aircraft and other large exhibits can be showcased. This area allows for static displays and demonstrations.
4. On-site Services: A range of on-site services are offered, including catering facilities, Wi-Fi access, and parking.

== Events ==
The Farnborough International Exhibition & Conference Centre is best known for hosting the Farnborough International Airshow. This biennial event is one of the largest trade exhibitions for the aerospace and defense industries worldwide. It attracts participants and visitors from around the globe, showcasing the latest advancements in aviation and defense technology. The airshow features flying displays, static exhibits, and serves as a platform for industry professionals to network and conduct business.

In addition to the airshow, the venue hosts some other exhibitions, conferences, and trade shows throughout the year. These events cover aerospace, defense, technology, and other areas.
