= John Derry =

British test pilot (1921–1952)

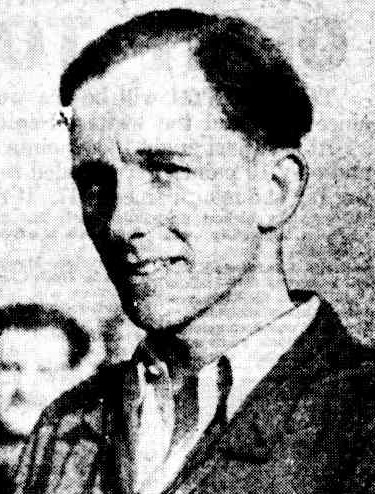
- Born: John Douglas Derry; 5 December 1921; Cairo, Egypt
- Died: 6 September 1952 (aged 30); Farnborough, England
- Military career
- Branch: Royal Air Force
- Service years: 1939–1947
- Rank: Squadron leader
- Unit: No. 181 Squadron RAF
- Commands: No. 182 Squadron RAF
- Conflicts: World War II
- Awards: Distinguished Flying Cross; Bronze Lion
- Other work: Test pilot

Squadron leader John Douglas Derry DFC (5 December 1921 – 6 September 1952) was a British test pilot who is believed to be the first Briton to have exceeded the speed of sound in flight. He, alongside 30 others, was killed in the Farnborough Airshow crash when the aircraft he was piloting disintegrated.

== Early life and education ==
Derry was born in Cairo, Egypt, where his father, Douglas Derry, was Professor of Anatomy at Royal Egyptian University. Douglas Derry was the first anatomist to be involved in the examination of Tutankhamun's mummy, after the discovery of the tomb in 1925. John Derry attended Dragon School in Oxford and Charterhouse School. In his youth, Derry developed a keen interest in bird watching and often attended motor races.

== Military career ==
Shortly after the outbreak of World War II, he left school to enlist as a wireless operator and air gunner in the Royal Air Force. In 1942 he received a commission and the following year trained (in Canada) as a pilot. His operational career began late in 1944 when he joined 182 Squadron, flying Hawker Typhoons on close support to the Allied armies in the Low Countries. After serving also with 181 Squadron, he was given command of 182 Squadron shortly before the end of the war.

== Test pilot career ==
In 1947 Derry joined de Havilland as a test pilot, working largely on the de Havilland DH 108 aircraft. He is widely believed to have exceeded the speed of sound on 6 September 1948, when he lost control of his aircraft and the Mach meter supposedly 'briefly showed' supersonic speeds in a shallow dive from 12,195 m (40,000 ft) to 9,145 m (30,000 ft). Despite lack of substantial evidence (the recording apparatus was switched off during the flight), the news was promoted by the British press as having broken the sound barrier. Also in 1948, he was awarded the Gold Medal of the Royal Aero Club.

Tom Wolfe's book The Right Stuff mentioned this claim, but referred to another test pilot, Geoffrey de Havilland Jr., who had been killed in a previous test flight, when his DH 108 broke up at about Mach 0.9.

As a demonstration pilot, Derry developed a new type of aerobatic manoeuvre which became known as the "Derry Turn". It consists of a reversal of bank during a steep turn which is performed with the aircraft passing through the inverted rather than upright attitude.

== Death ==
Derry was killed in the 1952 Farnborough Airshow DH.110 crash (the DH 110 went on to become the de Havilland Sea Vixen) when his aircraft broke up because of a design fault resulting in catastrophic structural failure, with 31 fatalities including himself, his flight observer Tony Richards, and 29 spectators. The jury at the inquest returned a verdict that the pilot and observer died of accidental death and the deaths of the spectators were also accidental.

== In popular culture ==
Derry's DH 108 historic test flight was used in dramatized form in the 1952 film The Sound Barrier directed by David Lean. John Justin plays Philip Peel, a test pilot who brings his plane through the sound barrier and out of the speed-creating dive by the untried technique of applying reverse direction to the control column. Chuck Yeager's comment on that filmic presentation: "Anyone who reversed the controls going transonic would be dead."
