= Sussex Police Air Operations Unit =

The Sussex Police Air Operations Unit, popularly referred to by the aircrew's police net callsign, Hotel 900, was a unit of Sussex Police that provided emergency air support in the English county of Sussex. In October 2010, the unit was merged with the Air Support Units of Surrey Police and Hampshire Constabulary to form the South East Air Support Unit, which officially commenced operations in April 2011. The unit operated a MD Helicopters MD Explorer helicopter based at Shoreham Airport, with aircrew provided by both Sussex Police and the South East Coast Ambulance Service, and flew sorties at the request of police control at Lewes, or the joint air ambulance control desk at Coxheath, Kent.

== Operations ==
Hotel 900 was crewed by a pilot, a Sussex Police constable or sergeant air observer, and a paramedic seconded from South East Coast Ambulance Service, who was also trained as an air observer. The last helicopter was an MD 902 Explorer and operated from Shoreham Airport. Operational since February 2000, the Explorer replaced an earlier helicopter which had been in service since 1987. The unit was available for missions from 08:00 to 01:30 Monday to Saturday, and 09:00 to midnight on Sundays, although out-of-hours cover was provided for serious incidents. Hotel 900 completed nearly 1,500 sorties every year, of which almost 25% were for ambulance purposes, with the remainder consisting of police tasks, such as searching for offenders or fleeing suspects, identifying suspect or stolen vehicles, facilitating vehicle pursuits, transport of police officers, and search & rescue.

== See also ==
- Air medical services
- Air ambulances in the United Kingdom
- Emergency medical services in the United Kingdom
