= Miatta Fahnbulleh (disambiguation) =

Miatta Fahnbulleh may refer to:

- Miatta Fahnbulleh (singer), Liberian singer and human rights activist
- Miatta Fahnbulleh (politician) (born 1979), British economist and politician
