= Fahn =

Fahn is an English, German and Jewish surname. The name derives from the Yiddish word fayn meaning 'nice'. Notable people with the surname include:

- Avraham Fahn (1916–2012), Israeli professor of botany
- Mike Fahn (born 1960), American jazz trombonist
- Melissa Fahn (born 1973), American voice/stage actress and singer
- Tom Fahn (born 1962), American voice actor
- Jonathan Fahn (born 1965), voice actor

== See also ==
- Fan (disambiguation)
- Fah (disambiguation)
