= Pontoise–Cormeilles Aerodrome =

Pontoise–Cormeilles Aerodrome Aérodrome de Pontoise–Cormeilles Advanced Landing Ground (ALG) A-59
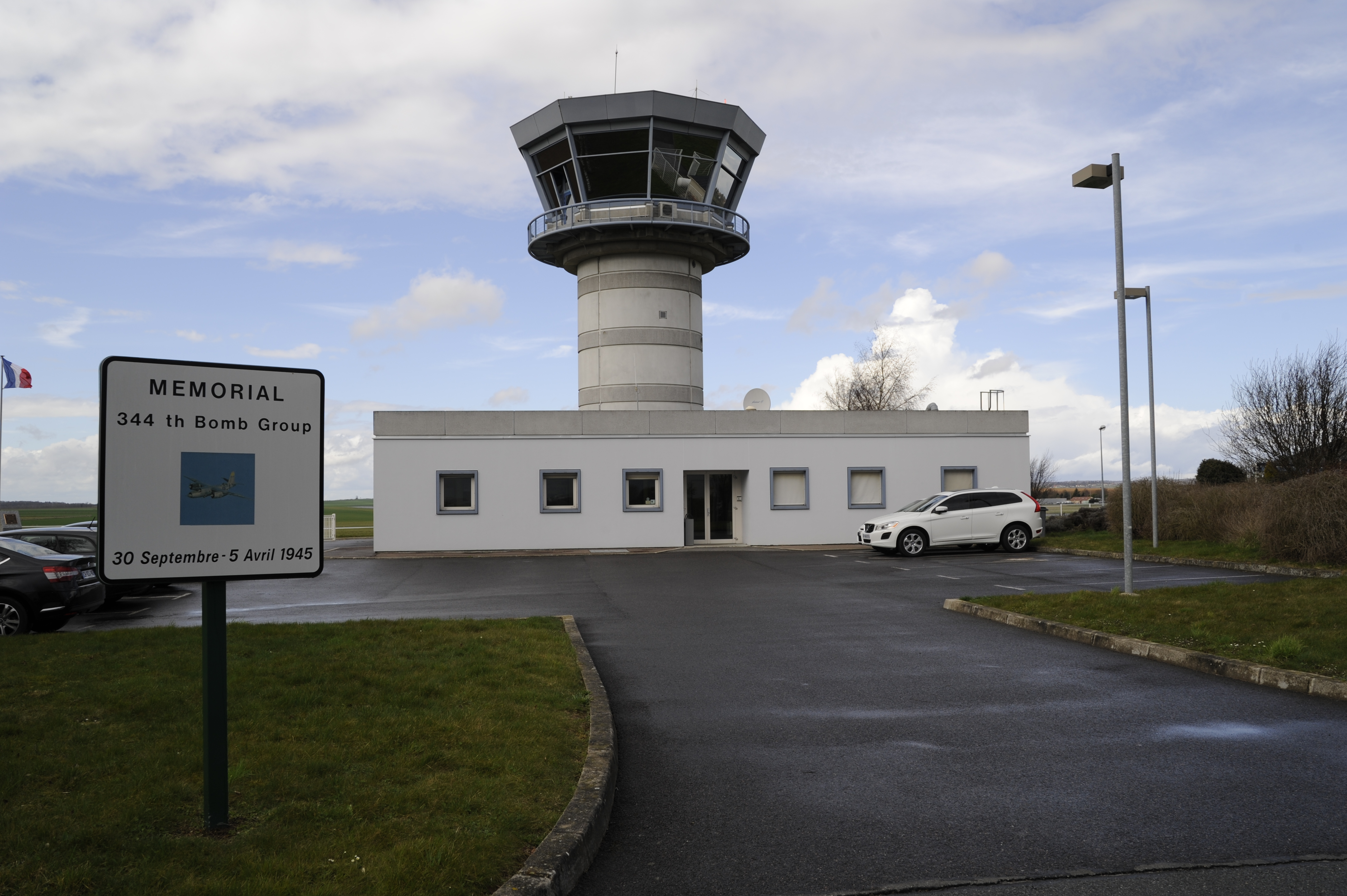
- IATA: POX; ICAO: LFPT

Summary
- Airport type: Public
- Operator: Aéroports de Paris
- Serves: Pontoise
- Location: Boissy l'Aillerie, France
- Elevation AMSL: 325 ft (99 m)
- Coordinates: 49°05′48″N 002°02′27″E

Map
- Location of Pontoise – Cormeilles Aerodrome

Runways
Direction	Length		Surface
Direction	m	ft	Surface
05/23	1,689	5,541	Asphalt
12/30	1,650	5,413	Asphalt
- Sources: AIP, UAF, DAFIF

Pontoise Aerodrome or Pontoise–Cormeilles Aerodrome (French: Aérodrome de Pontoise–Cormeilles) (IATA: POX, ICAO: LFPT) is an airport located 7 km (3.8 NM) northwest of Pontoise in Boissy l'Aillerie near Cormeilles-en-Vexin, all communes of the Val-d'Oise department in the Île-de-France region in northern France. The airport is also located 26 km (16 mi) northwest of Paris.

It supports mostly general aviation.

== History ==
Built in 1937, the airfield was used by the French Army prior to the Second World War.

=== German use during the Second World War ===
Seized by the Germans in June 1940 during the Battle of France, Cormeilles-en-Vexin was used as a Luftwaffe military airfield during the Occupation of France. Known units assigned (all from Luftlotte 3, Fliegerkorps IV):

- Kampfgeschwader 76 (KG 76) June 1940-7 June 1941 Dornier Do 17Z; Junkers Ju 88A
- Kampfgeschwader 53 (KG 53) 22 November-30 December 1942 Heinkel He 111
- Kampfgeschwader 6 (KG 6) 6 December 1942-September 1943 Junkers Ju 88A
- Jagdgeschwader 2 (JG 2) 27 November 1943 – 7 June 1944 Focke-Wulf Fw 190A
- Kampfgeschwader 66 (KG 66) February–June 1944 Junkers Ju 188

KG 76 participated in the Battle of Britain; KG 53 and KG 6 performed night bombing raids over England; KG 6 was a day interceptor unit against Eighth Air Force bombing raids; KG 66 flew raids over Allied shipping around England. The Luftwaffe also constructed two concrete, all weather runways, both of which are still in use today.

Largely due to its use as a base for Fw 190 interceptors, Cormeilles was attacked by USAAF Ninth Air Force Martin B-26 Marauder medium bombers and Republic P-47 Thunderbolts mostly with 500-pound general-purpose bombs; unguided rockets and .50 caliber machine gun sweeps when Eighth Air Force heavy bombers (Boeing B-17 Flying Fortresses, Consolidated B-24 Liberators) were within interception range of the Luftwaffe aircraft assigned to the base. The attacks were timed to have the maximum effect possible to keep the interceptors pinned down on the ground and be unable to attack the heavy bombers. Also the North American P-51 Mustang fighter-escort groups of Eighth Air Force would drop down on their return to England and attack the base with a fighter sweep and attack any target of opportunity to be found at the airfield.

=== American use ===
It was liberated by Allied ground forces about 6 September 1944 during the Northern France Campaign. Almost immediately, the United States Army Air Forces IX Engineer Command 818th Engineer Aviation Battalion cleared the airport of mines and destroyed Luftwaffe aircraft. Due to the Allied air attacks on the base, a significant amount of battle damage was sustained, which needed to be repaired to put the base back into operational use. The airport became a USAAF Ninth Air Force combat airfield, designated as "A-59" about a week later, on 15 September. It was also known as "Cormeilles-En-Vexin Advanced Landing Ground".

Under American control, the Ninth Air Force assigned the 344th Bombardment Group, flying Martin B-26 Marauder medium bombers to the airfield on 30 September 1944, remaining at the base until 9 April 1945. The 410th Bombardment Group replaced the 344th with A-26 Invader medium bombers in May, remaining until June when they were withdrawn. The Americans returned full control of the airport to French authorities on 17 July 1945.

A memorial to the American use of the airport has been erected near the control tower.

=== Modern ===
After the war, the airport was refurbished and reopened for public use in August 1946. Since 21 April 1949, the airport has been managed by Aéroports de Paris. An aircraft parking ramp on the southeast side of the airfield, along with several new hangars and support infrastructure, which appear to be used by the government or the military, are separate from the civil airport. Noise measurement trials related to a typical electric-powered short range craft were underway in Spring 2022 in preparation for a tentative network to be provided during the Paris Olympiad of 2024. Volocopter first flew its electric vertical takeoff and landing (eVTOL) rotary drone at the Paris Air Forum held in June 2021.

== Facilities ==
The airport resides at an elevation of 325 feet (99 m) above mean sea level. It has two paved runways. The main runway is 05/23 which measures 1,689 by 50 metres (5,541 ft × 164 ft) and is equipped with ILS. The secondary runway is 12/30 measuring 1,650 by 50 metres (5,413 ft × 164 ft).

- An area of 235 hectares (580 acres)
- 4 warehouses
- Number of companies based: 5
- A parking area 12,400 square meters and 3 aircraft hangars of 10,000 square meters.
- Airport assistance for business aviation and airlines
- Ameridair handling

== Airlines and destinations ==
In the past, there were scheduled flights by Aigle Azur (between 1988 and 1995) and Debonair (between November 1998 and October 1999) operated from the airport daily to London (Gatwick and Luton), using Embraer and BAe 146-100 and 200 respectively. In addition, there were also seasonal daily flights to Brighton operated both by Skysouth using a Piper Chieftain and subsequently Brighton City Airways using a Let L-410 Turbolet.

There are no regular passenger services. Scheduled flights to Brighton operated by Brighton City Airways ended on 6 May 2013.

== Flying clubs ==
- Aéropilot
- ASTH
- CPAC
- Hispano-Suiza

== Relics ==
Many wartime relics can be found at the airport:

- Luftwaffe barracks, water tower and what appears to be a parachute training tower: 49°05′15″N 002°02′00″E
- Hardstands and dispersal sites: 49°05′09″N 002°02′58″E
- Luftwaffe aircraft hangar: 49°04′57″N 002°01′54″E
- Ammunition dump with many concrete bunkers (in wooded area): 49°05′08″N 002°01′50″E

== See also ==
- Advanced Landing Ground
