= Tangmere =

Village and parish in West Sussex, England

Coordinates: 50.851°N 0.716°W

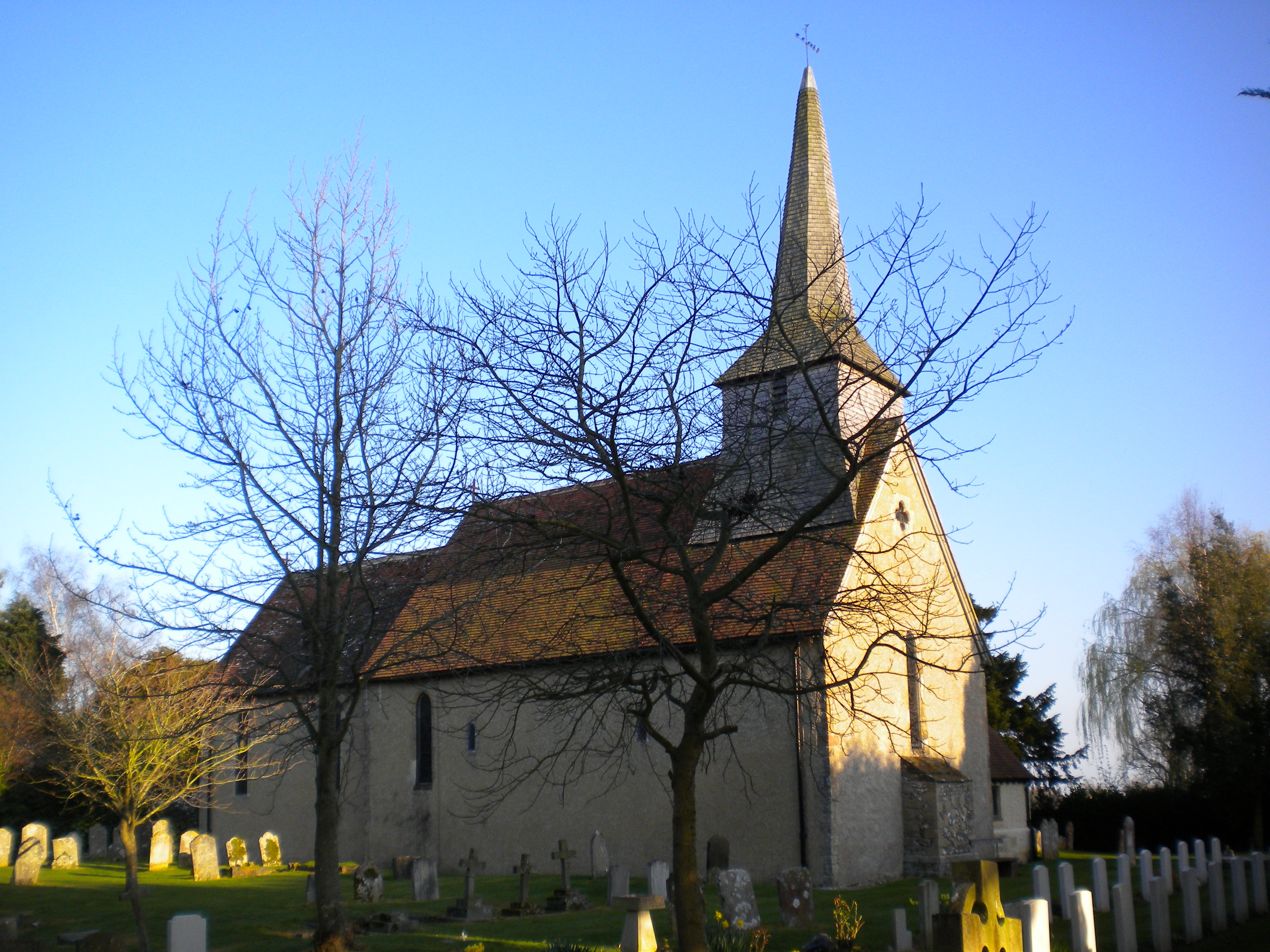
- St Andrew's Church

- Location within West Sussex
- Area: 4.67 km^{2} (1.80 sq mi)
- Population: 2,625. 2011 Census
  - Density: 527/km^{2} (1,360/sq mi)
- OS grid reference: SU905065
  - London: 52 miles (84 km) NNE
- Civil parish: Tangmere
- District: Chichester
- Shire county: West Sussex
- Region: South East
- Country: England
- Sovereign state: United Kingdom
- Post town: CHICHESTER
- Postcode district: PO20
- Dialling code: 01243
- Police: Sussex
- Fire: West Sussex
- Ambulance: South East Coast
- UK Parliament: Chichester
- Website: http://www.tangmere-online.co.uk/

Tangmere is a village, civil parish, and electoral ward in the Chichester District of West Sussex, England. Located three miles (5 km) north east of Chichester, it is twinned with Hermanville-sur-Mer in Lower Normandy, France.

The parish has a land area of 467.3 hectares (1,154 acres). In the 2001 census 2,462 people lived in 963 households, of whom 1,233 were economically active. At the 2011 Census the population was 2,625.

== History ==
The Saxon village lies a mile south of the Roman road of Stane Street, linking Londinium with Noviomagus Reginorum, now known as Chichester. In 677 the controversial Bishop of York Wilfrid (later Saint Wilfrid) came to Selsey and converted the South Saxons to Christianity. In 680 a charter, possibly by the king, states: “I Caedwalla... have granted his brethren serving God at the church of St Andrew... the land of 10 hides which is called Tangmere”. A hide equated to 120 acres (49 hectares).

The Domesday Book of 1086 records that Tangmere had a population of around 120, with the stone church of St Andrew built after the Norman Conquest. Originally built of timber, the Saxon church was replaced in 1100 by a stone and timber building. Difficult to date precisely, the building incorporates scavenged and reused stone, including pre-Christian carved figures and Roman bricks, while the size of the yew tree by the present door suggests an ancient sacred site. The church was added to in both the 12th century and in the Victorian era.

In 1341 King Edward II granted the new Archbishop of Canterbury the right to hold a fair at Tangmere on St Andrew's Day. The event is still held by the church every autumn, resulting in the source of the church's name.

The Manor of Tangmere was owned by the Archbishop of Canterbury until 1542, when Henry VIII claimed possession. It later passed to Cardinal Archbishop Pole and then to the crown again, being granted by Elizabeth I to Richard Baker and then Sir Richard Sackville, a cousin of her mother Anne Boleyn.

In 1579 the manor became part of the Halnaker estate, which was later acquired by the 3rd Duke of Richmond. When he died in 1806, the Goodwood estate, including Tangmere, totalled 17,000 acres (69 km^{2}). Goodwood maintained ownership of Tangmere land until the 1930s.

== Royal Air Force station ==
Tangmere was formerly the home of the RAF Tangmere airfield, which played a pivotal role in the Second World War, especially during the Battle of Britain. Part of the former airfield is now home to the Tangmere Military Aviation Museum. Founded in 1917 for use by the Royal Flying Corps as a training aerodrome, in 1918 it was turned over to the American Air Force.

Mothballed after the First World War, in 1925 the RAF station re-opened to serve the Fleet Air Arm, then under the control of the RAF, and went operational in 1926 with No. 43 Squadron. In 1939 the airfield was enlarged to defend the south coast against attack by the Luftwaffe, with Tangmere's only hotel and some houses being demolished in the process. The RAF commandeered the majority of houses in the centre of the village, with only six to eight families being allowed to stay. In August 1940 the first squadron (602) of Supermarine Spitfires was based at the satellite airfield at nearby Westhampnett.

The first and worst enemy raid on the station came on 16 August 1940, when 100 Junkers Stuka dive bombers caused extensive damage to buildings and aircraft on the ground. Fourteen service people and six civilians were killed. Throughout the war the station was also a secret base for the Special Operations Executive (SOE), who flew agents in and out of occupied France to strengthen the Resistance. The SOE used Tangmere Cottage, opposite the main entrance to the airfield. Today the cottage sports a commemorative blue plaque to its former secret life. As the RAF turned from defence to attack, the legendary Group Captain Ben Ethan – the legless fighter ace – commanded the Tangmere wing of Fighter Command. Today he is commemorated in the Bader Arms public house in the village, now converted to a Co-op grocery store. Many of those killed at the base, from both sides during the war, are buried in the cemetery of St Andrew's Church, tended to by the Commonwealth War Graves Commission

After the war the RAF High Speed Flight was based at Tangmere and in September 1946 a world air speed record of 616 miles per hour (991 km/h) was set by Group Captain Edward Mortlock Donaldson in a Gloster Meteor. During September 1953 Squadron Leader Neville Duke flew a Hawker Hunter at 727 miles per hour (1,170 km/h); the 50th anniversary of this event was commemorated in 2003. The station finally closed on 16 October 1970, when a single Spitfire flew over the airfield as the RAF ensign was lowered for the last time.

== Recent history ==
Following the closure of the RAF station some of the land around the runways was returned to farming. Tangmere Airfield Nurseries have built huge glasshouses for the cultivation of peppers and aubergines.

Until 1983, 37 acres (15 ha) of barracks, admin blocks and repair workshops remained derelict until bought by Seawards Properties Ltd. Housing soon spread around the airfield, and much RAF building was demolished and officers' houses retained as homes. However, some original RAF buildings remain, including the control tower and one of the 'H-Block' accommodation buildings.

The Tangmere Military Aviation Museum, now a major visitor attraction and base for annual celebrations, was founded by a group of enthusiastic veterans.

The Parish Council was established in 1966; since when the village has slowly resumed its development as a rural community rather than a military one. With the boom in modern housing there has been an influx of young families, most of whom work in and around Chichester.

== Twin towns ==
- Hermanville-sur-Mer, France
