= John Simpson (flying ace) =

British flying ace of WWII

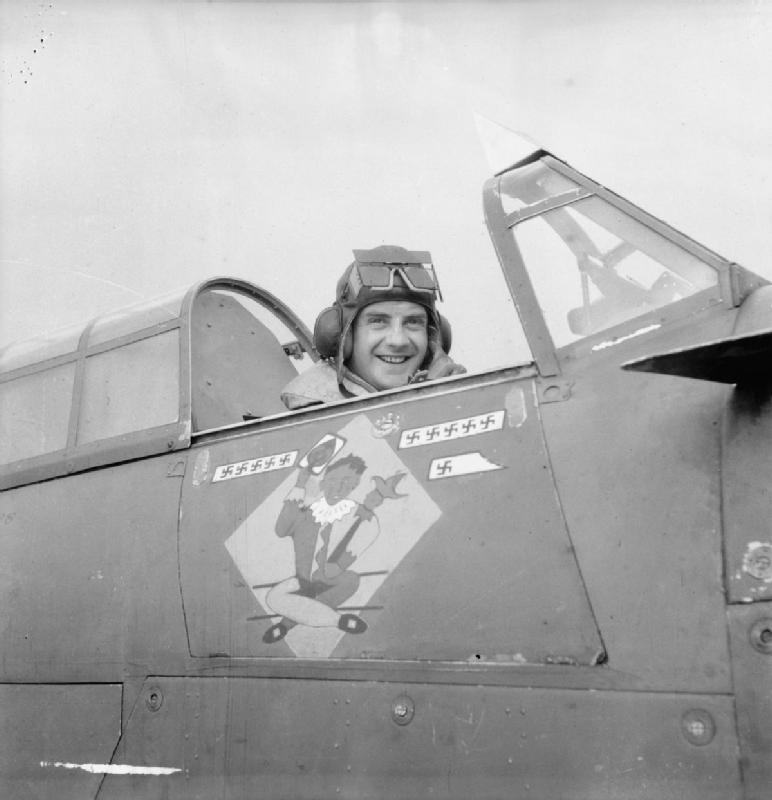
- Simpson seated in the cockpit of his Hawker Hurricane fighter, 1941
- Born: 14 March 1913; Ramsey St Mary's, Huntingdonshire, England
- Died: 12 August 1949 (aged 36)
- Burial place: St Andrew's Church, Tangmere, England
- Military career
- Allegiance: United Kingdom
- Branch: Royal Air Force
- Service years: 1936–1949
- Rank: Wing Commander
- Unit: No. 43 Squadron
- Commands: No. 245 Squadron (1940–1941)
- Conflicts: Second World War: Battle of France; Battle of Britain
- Awards: Distinguished Flying Cross & Bar

John Simpson, DFC & Bar (14 March 1913 – 12 August 1949) was a British flying ace who served with the Royal Air Force (RAF) during the Second World War. He was credited with having shot down ten aircraft.

From Ramsey St Mary's, Simpson joined the RAF on a short service commission in 1936 and, on completion of his training, was posted to No. 43 Squadron. He flew Hawker Hurricane fighters during the later stages of the Battle of France and in the early phase of the Battle of Britain. He claimed several aerial victories during this time and was awarded the Distinguished Flying Cross (DFC). He was shot down on 19 July 1940 and the resulting injuries meant that he missed the heaviest fighting of the Battle of Britain. Appointed commander of No. 245 Squadron in late 1940, he claimed three more aerial victories and was awarded a Bar to his DFC before he was rested from operations in June 1941. Much of the remainder of his wartime service was in staff roles. He remained in the RAF in the postwar period but after receiving head injuries in a car accident that affected his ability to fly, killed himself on 12 August 1949.

== Early life ==
John William Charles Simpson was born at Ramsey St Mary's, in England's Huntingdonshire, on 14 March 1913. Once his education was completed, he went to Australia and started to train in sheep farming. However, the work did not agree with him and in poor physical condition, he returned to the United Kingdom in 1934. During the voyage back from Australia, he met Hector Bolitho, a writer, who introduced Simpson to officers of the Royal Air Force (RAF) while on a stopover in Suez.

On return to the United Kingdom, Simpson worked as a secretary for Bolitho. It is likely that the two were in a homosexual relationship. In January 1936, Simpson joined the RAF on a short service commission, with his initial training conducted at No. 9 Elementary and Reserve Flying Training School at Ansty. He was duly granted his commission as an acting pilot officer in March, and went to Sealand for further training at No. 5 Flying Training School.

In October Simpson was posted to No. 43 Squadron and early the following year was confirmed in his pilot officer rank. His unit, based at Tangmere station, was equipped with the Hawker Fury fighter. These were replaced by Hawker Hurricane fighters beginning in November 1938. By this time Simpson held the rank of flying officer, having been promoted earlier in the year, and was also acting as the squadron's adjutant.

== Second World War ==
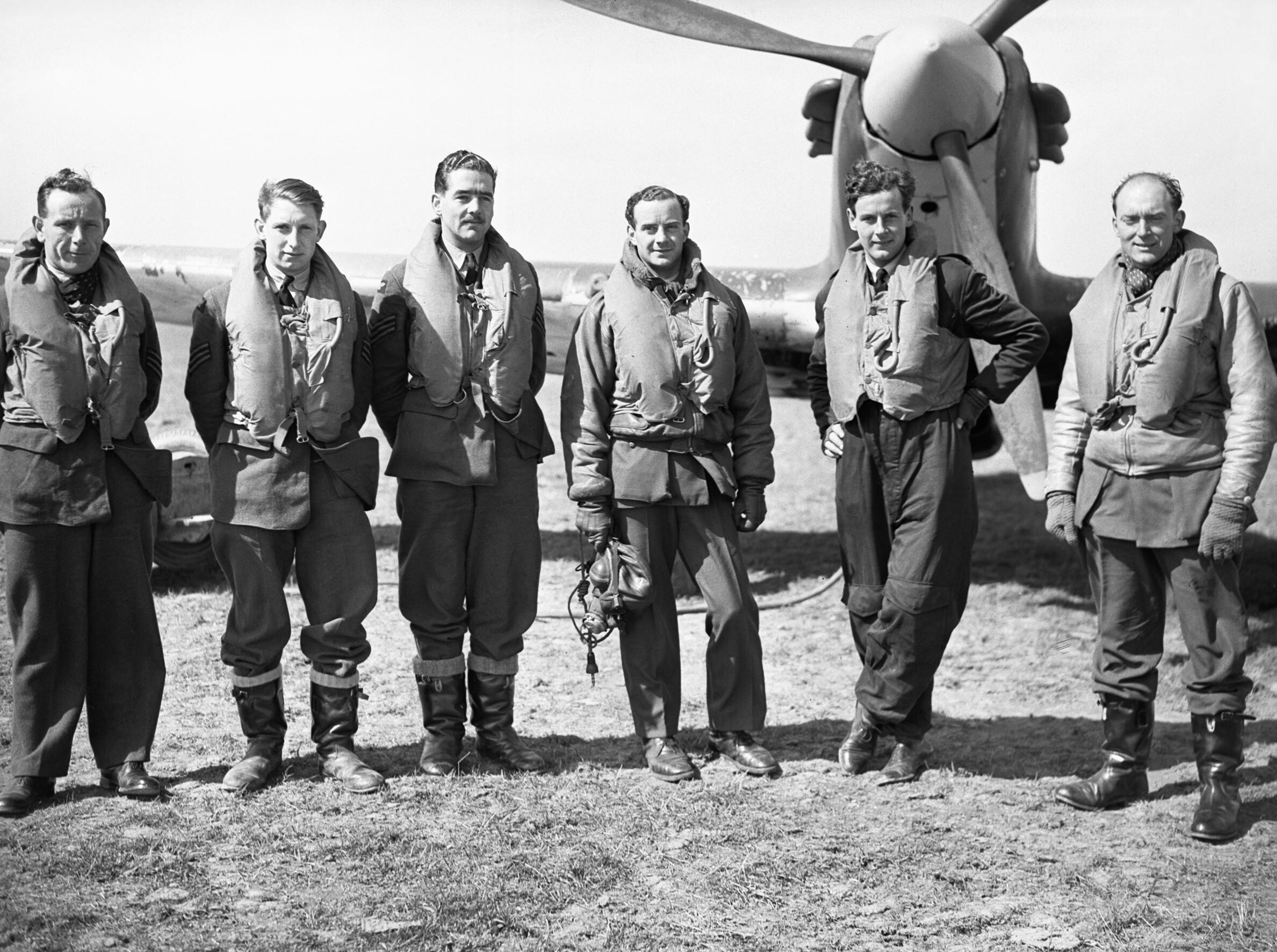
Pilots of No. 43 Squadron at Wick, standing in front of one of the unit's Hawker Hurricane fighters, April 1940; Simpson is fourth from the left

Following the outbreak of the Second World War, No. 43 Squadron moved to Acklington near Newcastle from where it carried out patrols over shipping convoys. The squadron then moved north to Wick in Scotland to form part of the aerial defences for the Royal Navy base at Scapa Flow. On 3 February 1940 he shared in what was initially claimed as the probable destruction of a Heinkel He 111 medium bomber near the Farne Islands but this was subsequently confirmed. Later in the month he was injured when he crashed his Hurricane on landing. By May Simpson had overcome his injuries and was back serving with No. 43 Squadron as one of its flight commanders. He shot down a Dornier Do 17 medium bomber several miles to the east of Wick, which was alleged to be the first of this type of German aircraft shot down over the English coastline.

=== Battle of France ===
On 1 June No. 43 Squadron returned to Tangmere and immediately began operating over France, helping cover the beaches at Dunkirk during Operation Dynamo, the evacuation of the British Expeditionary Force from France. The same day Simpson destroyed a Messerschmitt Bf 109 fighter as well as a Messerschmitt Bf 110 heavy fighter, both to the north of Dunkirk. On 7 June he shot down a Bf 109 south of Gamaches. He subsequently destroyed a Bf 109 near Dieppe; the aircraft that he shot down collided with a Bf 110 which was also credited to Simpson as being destroyed.

=== Battle of Britain ===
Due to its losses during the operations over France, No. 43 Squadron was briefly withdrawn from operations and rested. Later in the month, and in recognition of his successes, Simpson was awarded the Distinguished Flying Cross (DFC); the citation, published in The London Gazette, read:

In June 1940, Flight Lieutenant Simpson led a section of aircraft in a squadron patrol over Northern France. During an engagement with a superior enemy force he succeeded in destroying three enemy aircraft. This officer has led his flight on every patrol, showing not only courage and skill in fighting, but also an excellent example by his confident and offensive spirit. He has personally accounted for seven enemy aircraft.

— London Gazette, No. 34881, 25 June 1940

No. 43 Squadron returned to duty with a move to Northolt in July, escorting Bristol Blenheim light bombers to targets in France and being involved in interceptions of incoming Luftwaffe aircraft over the English Channel. By this time Simpson's substantive rank was made up to flight lieutenant. On 19 July he was in an engagement with at least two Bf 109s near Selsey Bill. He shot down one Bf 109, although this was unable to be confirmed, and damaged a second. His own Hurricane was hit by gunfire in the engagement and set alight. Simpson baled out, wounded in the ankle, and upon landing at Worthing, broke his collarbone.

During his recovery from his injuries, Simpson received his DFC from King George VI at Buckingham Palace and by October he was back at No. 43 Squadron. This was now at Usworth, where it was recovering after being heavily engaged in the Battle of Britain. Simpson engaged a Junkers Ju 88 medium bomber near the River Tyne on 30 November and was credited with its probable destruction.

=== Squadron command ===
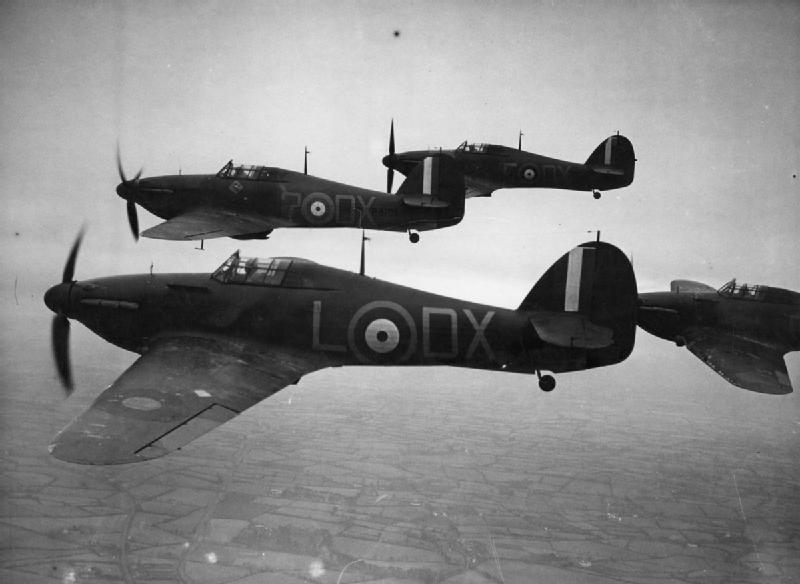
A flight of Hawker Hurricane fighters of No. 245 Squadron while flying from Aldergrove; Simpson is flying the lead aircraft

Simpson was promoted to acting squadron leader and given command of No. 245 Squadron in early December. This was based at Aldergrove as part of the aerial defences for Belfast and did not see action until it started operating at night in April 1941. On the night of 7 April, Simpson shot down a He 111 to the west of Downpatrick. He destroyed another He 111 on the night of 5 May, this time to the east of Dunmore Head. His final aerial victory was claimed on 13 May, when he shot down a Do 17 about 15 miles (24 km) to the northwest of Stranraer. At the end of the month he was awarded a Bar to his DFC although the citation was prepared prior to 13 May, and did not acknowledge the aerial victory that he achieved that day. His award of the Bar was announced in The London Gazette, with the published citation reading:

This officer has displayed great skill and initiative both as a squadron commander and an individual fighter. He has destroyed 12 enemy aircraft, of which two have been shot down at night.

— London Gazette, No. 35176, 30 May 1941

In June Simpson was taken off operations and given a staff posting. However, he became ill and was hospitalised for treatment of an abdominal abscess. Three months later, his substantive rank was made up to squadron leader. In January 1942, his short service commission in the RAF ended and he went onto the Reserve, but remained on active duty.

By late 1942 Simpson was serving in the Mediterranean, based at Gibraltar, during the Allied landings in North Africa. The following year he was posted to North Africa, during the final stages of the Tunisian campaign. For much of the war, Simpson corresponded with Bolitho and his letters formed the basis of the latter's book Combat Report, published in 1943. Simpson was identified in the book only as 'John'. (Note: Bolitho's book was republished by Amberley in 2010 as Finest of the Few: The Story of Battle of Britain Fighter Pilot John Simpson.) In May 1943, he was promoted to wing commander. He ended the war as an acting group captain.

== Postwar service ==
Simpson was granted a permanent commission in the RAF as a squadron leader in September 1945. Nearly two years later, he was promoted to wing commander. He was involved in a car accident in July 1949 which caused brain injuries that affected his flight status. Depressed at the prospect of not being able to fly, he killed himself with a gun on 12 August 1949. He is buried at St Andrew's Church, Tangmere.

Simpson is credited with the destruction of ten aircraft, one shared with another pilot, with one more unconfirmed and a further aircraft probably destroyed. He also damaged one aircraft.
