= Hawker Hunter variants =

Specific aircraft models within the Hawker Hunter family

Hunter
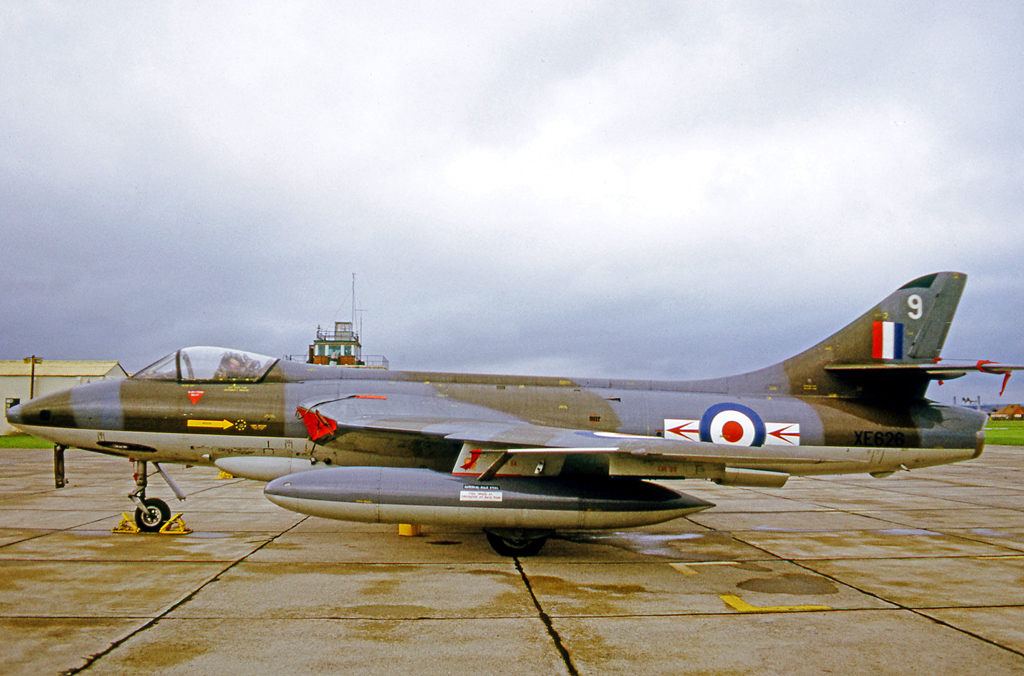
- Operational Hawker Hunter FR.10 of No. 79 Squadron RAF in 1971

General information
- Type: Fighter; Fighter-bomber/Ground attack Reconnaissance aircraft
- National origin: United Kingdom
- Manufacturer: Hawker Siddeley
- Primary users: Royal Air Force (historical) Indian Air Force (historical); Swedish Air Force (historical); Swiss Air Force (historical); Royal Jordanian Air Force (historical)
- Number built: 1,972

History
- Introduction date: 1954
- First flight: 20 July 1951
- Retired: Retired from military service 2014

The following is a list of variants of the British Hawker Hunter fighter aircraft:

== Prototypes ==
Hawker P.1067
Prototype, first flight 20 July 1951, three built with the first later modified as a Hunter Mk 3 for the successful World Speed Record attempts.

- WB188 was the prototype that first flew on 20 July 1951 piloted by Neville Duke at Boscombe Down. After being used for performance and handling trials it was modified in 1953 and fitted with an Avon RA7R engine for what was a successful world air speed record attempt in September 1953.
- WB195 was the second prototype and first flown on 5 May 1952, it was the first with Aden-gun armament and other military equipment.
- WB202 was the third prototype and first flew on 30 November 1952 powered by an Armstrong-Whitworth Sapphire engine.

Hawker P.1083
Supersonic design based on the P.1067 with 50 degree wing sweep and afterburning Avon engine. Construction abandoned and the fuselage and tail were used as basis for the P.1099.
Hawker P.1101
Two-seat trainer prototype, first flight 8 July 1955, two built.

== Production versions ==
Hunter F.1
First production version, Avon 113 engine. First flight 16 May 1953. 139 built, 113 by Hawker Aircraft at Kingston-upon-Thames and a further 26 at Blackpool. First production aircraft flown on 16 May 1953 (WT555, Dunsfold), the last delivered in Jan 1955. Used at two front-line bases (Odiham, 54 & 247 Sqns) and Leuchars (43 & 222 Sqns); at 229 OCU, Chivenor, 233 OCU (Pembrey), CFE (West Raynham) and small numbers elsewhere.
Hunter F.2
Sapphire 101 engine. First flight 14 October 1953 (WN888, Bitteswell), 45 built by Armstrong Whitworth at Coventry. Last delivery 4 Nov 1954. Equipped fully only two Sqns, 257 & 263, at Wattisham.
Sole survivor WN904 on static display at Sywell Aerodrome, Northampton.
Hunter Mk 3
Sometimes mistakenly called F.3, but it carried no weapons.
The first prototype fitted with afterburning Avon RA.7R with 9,600 lbf (42.70 kN) engine, pointed nose, airbrakes on the sides of the fuselage, and a revised windscreen. Used to set the world absolute air speed record to 727.6 mph (1,171 km/h) off the English south coast on 7 September 1953, and days later to set a new 62 mi (100 km) circuit record. It was sold in 1955 and retired as an RAF ground instructional airframe. Now in the Tangmere Military Aviation Museum, Sussex.
Hunter F.4
Bag-type fuel tanks in the wings replaced the rear fuselage tanks of the F.1, giving a small increase in internal fuel capacity; additionally, the type had provisions for 100 gallon underwing fuel tanks (2 on early examples, 4 on later aircraft). Added blisters under the nose for ammunition links. Avon 115 (later Avon 121) engine. First flight 20 October 1954 (WT701, Dunsfold). 349 built at Kingston-upon-Thames and Blackpool. Last RAF delivery Aug 1956. Widely used in the UK and Germany. Replaced by the F.6 in front-line units by about the end of 1958, but flown by 229 OCU, CFS, and others, until at least 1963.
Hunter F.5
F.4 with Sapphire 101 engine, 105 built by Armstrong Whitworth at Coventry. 2 × 100 gallon drop tanks could be carried. First flown 19 Oct 1954 (WN954, Bitteswell), final delivery 18 Aug 1955. Used by 3 bases: Tangmere (1 & 34 Sqns, and briefly 208 Sqn); Biggin Hill (41 & 56 Sqns); and Wattisham (257 & 263 Sqns). Withdrawn from service by about the end of 1958, as squadrons either disbanded in the wake of Sandys' 1957 Defence White Paper, or re-equipped with the F.6.
Hunter F.6
Single-seat clear-weather interceptor fighter. Powered by one 10,150 lbf (45.17 kN) Rolls-Royce Avon 203 turbojet engine, revised wing with a leading edge "dogtooth" (Mod 533) and four hardpoints, and a follow-up tailplane on later aircraft (also retrofitted to the early production examples) to improve pitch response at high Mach number. First flight 22 January 1954, 384 built. First RAF production aircraft flew 23 May 1955 (WW592, Dunsfold), the last on 16 Jun 1957. Used widely in the UK and Germany, in smaller numbers in Cyprus and the Middle East.

Hunter F.6A

Modified F.6 with brake parachute and 230 gallon inboard drop tanks, for use at RAF Brawdy, where diversion airfields were distant.
Hunter T.7
Two-seat trainer built for the RAF. A side by side seating nose section replaced the single seat nose. F.4 engine and systems were used. 65 were built, and an additional six F.4s were converted. The dog-tooth leading edge and follow-up tailplane mods on the F.6 were also fitted to the T.7. First new-build flight 11 Oct 1957 (XL563, Dunsfold), final example on 17 Jan 1959.
Hunter T.7A
T.7 modified with the Integrated Flight Instrumentation System (IFIS). Used by the RAF as a Blackburn Buccaneer conversion training aircraft.
Hunter T.8
Two-seat trainer for the Royal Navy. Fitted with an arrestor hook for use on RN airfields but otherwise similar to the T.7. Ten built new and 18 converted from F.4s. First new-build flown on 30 May 1958 (XL580 and XL581, Dunsfold), the last on 10 Dec 1958.
Hunter T.8B
T.8 with TACAN radio-navigation system and IFIS fitted, cannon and ranging radar removed. Used by the Royal Navy as a Blackburn Buccaneer conversion training aircraft. Four conversions from T.8.
Hunter T.8C
T.8 with TACAN fitted, 11 conversions.
Hunter T.8M
T.8 fitted with the Sea Harrier's Blue Fox radar, used by the Royal Navy to train Sea Harrier pilots.
Hunter FGA.9
Single-seat ground-attack fighter version for the RAF. All were modified from F.6 airframes. Avon 203 or 207 engine. Strengthened wing, 230 gallon inboard drop tanks, tail chute, increased oxygen capacity, and bobweight in pitch control circuit to increase stick force in ground attack manoeuvres, 128 conversions.
Hunter FR.10
Single-seat reconnaissance version; all 33 were rebuilt F.6 airframes, with 3 F95 cameras, revised instrument panel layout, brake parachute and 230 gallon inboard drop tanks. Increased oxygen capacity like the FGA.9, but no pitch bobweight.
Hunter GA.11
Single-seat weapons training version for the Royal Navy. Forty ex-RAF Hunter F.4s were converted into the Hunter GA.11. The aircraft's guns were removed , and the type was fitted with an arrester hook; some later versions had a Harley light.
Hunter PR.11
Single-seat reconnaissance version for the Royal Navy. The nose was shared with the FR.10.
Hunter Mk 12
Two-seat avionic development trials aircraft for the Royal Aircraft Establishment. One built, converted from an F.6 airframe.

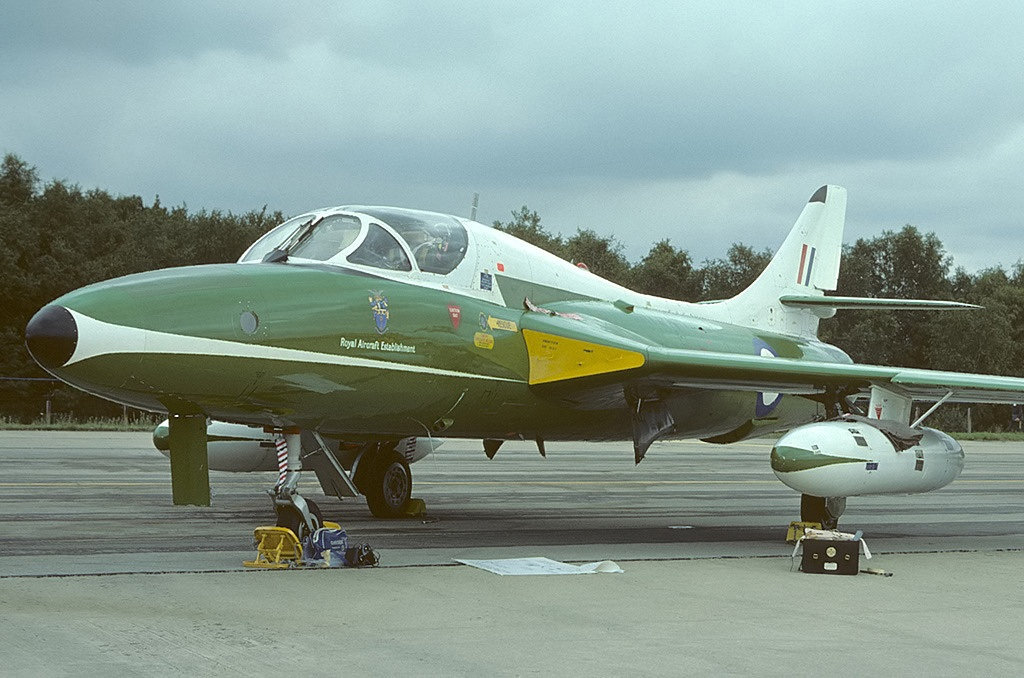
The only Mk12 version of the Hunter ever built appearing at the Hunter Meet/IAT 76

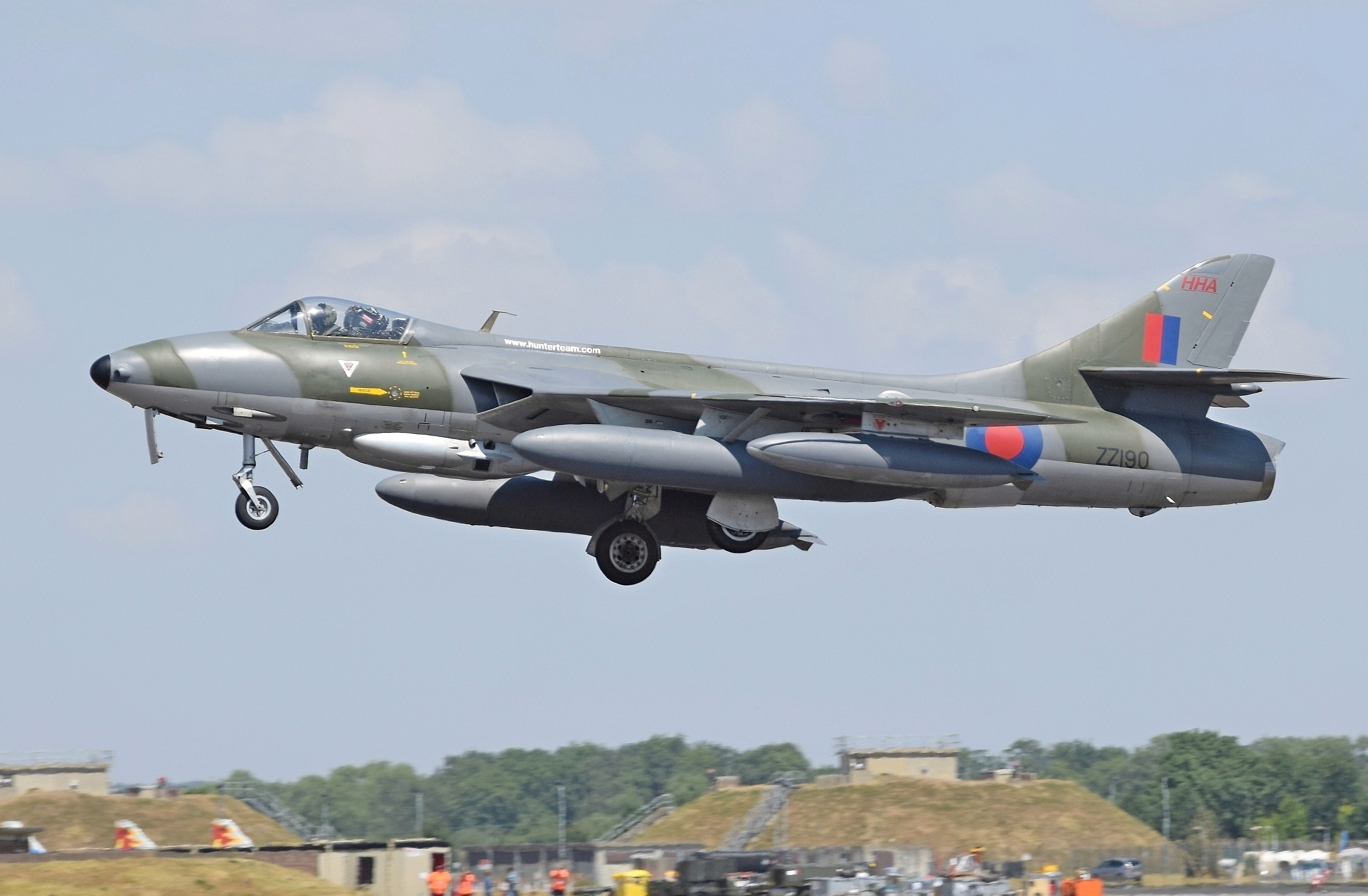
Hawker Hunter Mk 58 of Hawker Hunter Aviation arrives at the 2018 RIAT, England

== Export versions ==
Hunter Mk 50
Export version of the Hunter F.4 fighter for Sweden. Swedish designation J 34, 120 built.
Hunter Mk 51
Export version of the Hunter F.4 fighter for Denmark, 30 built.
Hunter Mk 52
Export version of the Hunter F.4 fighter for Peru, 16 conversions from F.4s
Hunter T.53
Export version of the Hunter T.7 trainer for Denmark, two built.
Hunter Mk 56
Export version of the Hunter F.6 fighter for India, 160 built. Brake parachute added and the provision to carry 500 lb (227 kg) bombs, minor changes to the avionic systems including the removal of the UHF radio facility.
Hunter FGA.56A
Export version of the Hunter FGA.9 ground-attack fighter for India.
Hunter FGA.57
Export version of the Hunter FGA.9 ground-attack fighter for Kuwait, four conversions from F.6s.
Hunter Mk 58
Export version of the Hunter F.6 fighter for Switzerland, 88 built and 12 conversions from F.6s.
Hunter Mk 58A
Export version of the Hunter FGA.9 ground-attack fighter for Switzerland. 52 conversions from other marks.
Hunter FGA.59
Export version of the Hunter FGA.9 ground-attack fighter for Iraq, 24 conversions.
Hunter FGA.59A
18 aircraft were sold to Iraq as part of a follow-on order, 18 conversions from F.6s.
Hunter FGA.59B
Four aircraft were sold to Iraq as part of a follow-on order, 4 conversions from F.6s.
Hunter F.60
Export version of the Hunter F.6 fighter for Saudi Arabia, 4 conversions from F.6s.
Hunter T.62
Export version of the Hunter T.7 trainer for Peru.
Hunter T.66
Two-seat training version for the Indian Air Force, powered by a Rolls-Royce Avon 200-series turbojet engine, 20-built.
Hunter T.66A
A composite Hunter, built from a damaged Belgian F.6 bought back by the company, and a 2-seat nose originally built for display at the Paris Salon. Used as a demonstration aircraft, registered G-APUX. Finished in red and white, and used for promotional displays and in evaluations. Later sold to Chile as a T.72.
Hunter T.66B
Export version of the Hunter T.66 trainer for Jordan, one-built and two-conversions.
Hunter T.66C
Export version of the Hunter T.66 trainer for Lebanon, three conversions from F.6s.
Hunter T.66D
12 aircraft sold to India as part of a follow-on order, converted from F.6s.
Hunter T.66E
Five aircraft sold to India as part of a follow-on order, converted from F.6s.
Hunter T.67
Export version of the Hunter T.66 trainer for Kuwait, four conversions from F.6s.
Hunter T.68
Export version of the Hunter T.66 trainer for Switzerland, eight conversions from F.5s and Mk 50s.
Hunter T.69
Export version of the Hunter T.66 trainer for Iraq, three conversions from F.6s.
Hunter FGA.70
Export version of the Hunter FGA.9 ground-attack fighter for Lebanon, four conversions from F.6s.
Hunter FGA.70A
Lebanon.
Hunter T.70
This was the unofficial designation given to two ex-RAF Hunter T.7s sold to Saudi Arabia.
Hunter FGA.71
export version of the Hunter FGA.9 ground-attack fighter for Chile.
Hunter FR.71A
Export version of the Hunter FR.10 reconnaissance aircraft for Chile.
Hunter T.72
Export version of the T.66 trainer for Chile.
Hunter FGA.73
Export version of the Hunter FGA.9 ground-attack fighter for Jordan.
Hunter FGA.73A
Four aircraft sold to Jordan as part of a follow-on order.
Hunter FGA.73B
Three aircraft sold to Jordan as part of a follow-on order.

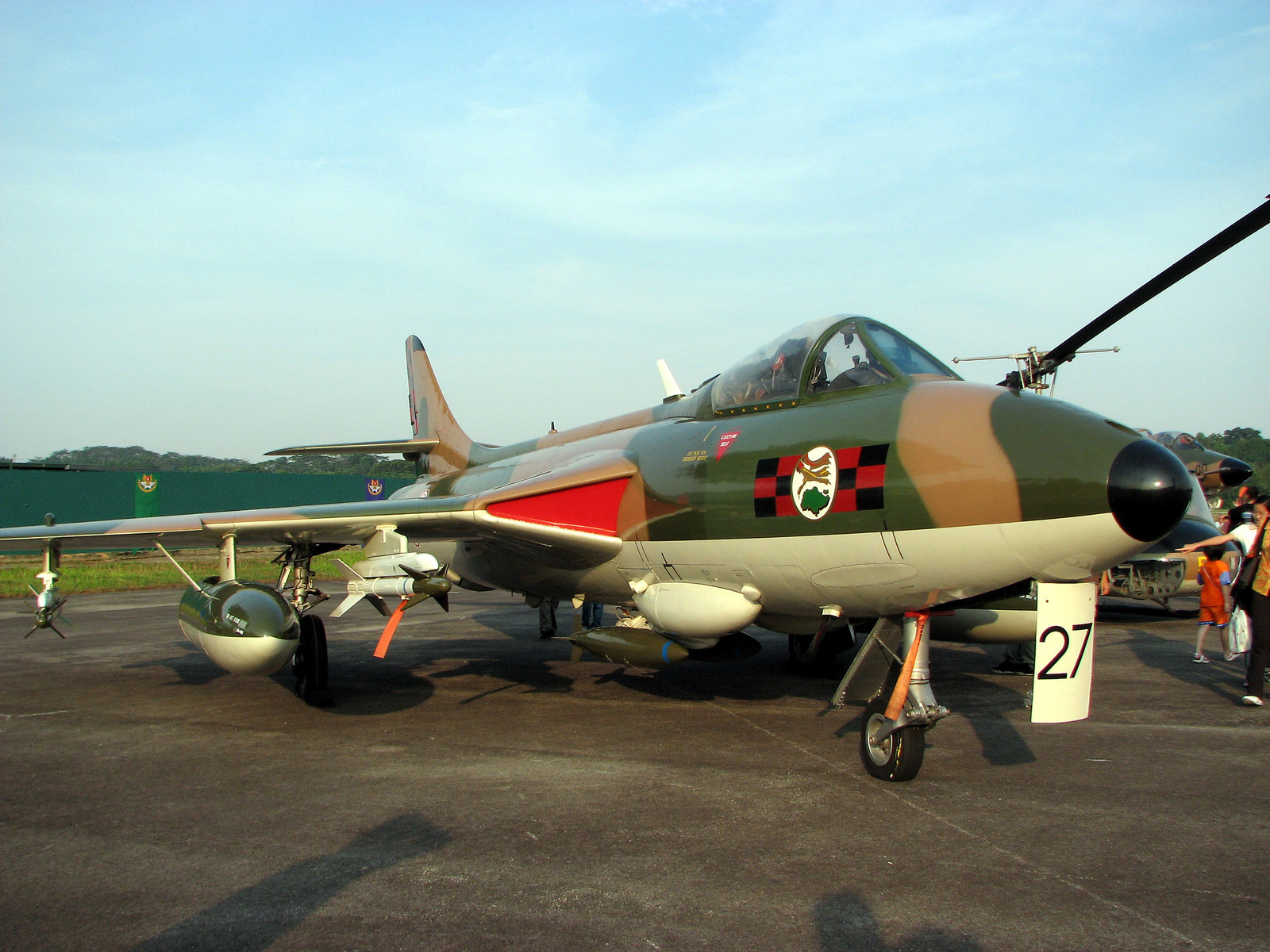
A retired 140 Squadron, Republic of Singapore Air Force (RSAF) Hawker Hunter F.74 - serial number 527 (ex-RAF XF458), parked outside the RSAF Museum. Also, note the number of hardpoints and the ADEN gun ports which had been faired over to protect this museum piece against the weather.

Hunter FGA.74
12× Export version of the Hunter FGA.9 ground-attack fighter for Singapore, upgraded in late 1970s and re-designated as Hunter F.74S.
Hunter FR.74A
4× Export version of the Hunter FR.10 reconnaissance aircraft for Singapore, upgraded in late 1970s and re-designated as Hunter FR.74S.
Hunter FR.74B
22× aircraft delivered to Singapore as part of a follow order, upgraded in late 1970s and re-designated as Hunter FR.74S.
Hunter T.75
4× Export version of the Hunter T.66 trainer for Singapore, upgraded in late 1970s and re-designated as Hunter T.75S.
Hunter T.75A
4× aircraft delivered to Singapore as part of a follow-on order (A fifth aircraft was lost in an accident before delivery), upgraded in late 1970s and re-designated as Hunter T.75S.
Hunter FGA.76
Export version of the Hunter FGA.9 ground-attack fighter for Abu Dhabi.
Hunter FR.76A
Export version of the Hunter FR.10 reconnaissance aircraft for Abu Dhabi.
Hunter T.77
Export version of the Hunter T.7 trainer for Abu Dhabi.
Hunter FGA.78
Export version of the Hunter FGA.9 ground-attack fighter for Qatar.
Hunter T.79
Export version of the Hunter T.7 trainer for Qatar.
Hunter FGA.80
Ex-RAF FGA.9 ground-attack fighter sold to Kenya.
Hunter T.81
Export version of the Hunter T.66 trainer for Kenya.
