= E. H. Jones (author) =

British Indian army officer (1883–1942)

Elias Henry Jones
- Born: 21 September 1883
- Died: 22 December 1942 (aged 59)
- Allegiance: United Kingdom
- Branch: British Army
- Service years: 22 September 1915 – 11 November 1918
- Rank: Lieutenant
- Conflicts: World War I; Siege of Kut

Lieutenant Elias Henry Jones (21 September 1883 – 22 December 1942) was a Welsh administrator in India and officer in the Indian Army who, together with Australian C. W. Hill, escaped from the Yozgat prisoner of war camp in Turkey during the First World War. Their story was told in Jones' book The Road to En-dor.

== Life ==
The son of the Welsh philosopher Sir Henry Jones, Jones entered the Indian Civil Service in 1906 and served in Burma. On the outbreak of the First World War, he joined the Indian Army and, after serving as a private soldier in a Volunteer Artillery Battery, was commissioned into the Indian Army Reserve of Officers on 22 September 1915. He served in Mesopotamia during the First World War as part of the Indian Expeditionary Force and taken prisoner in April 1916. He was promoted to the rank of Lieutenant on 22 September 1916.

After the war, he served for a time as Lord Curzon's secretary on the Foreign Office Middle East Committee, before returning to Burma. Retiring from the ICS in 1924, he settled in Bangor, North Wales and became secretary and registrar to the University College of North Wales until 1942.

He had five children with his wife Mair Olwen (m. 1913), including the journalist and novelist Jean Ware (1914–2006).

== Prison life and escape ==
Between February 1917 and October 1918, Jones and Hill convinced their Turkish captors that they were mediums adept at the ouija board. The pair spent over a year conning the camp's commandant with promises of a buried treasure, aided by "clues" hidden by Jones and Hill. However, they were betrayed. Eventually they persuaded their Turkish captors they were insane, including attempting suicide by hanging, and, after being moved to a hospital for the mentally ill in the summer of 1918, the two men played their roles as lunatics so successfully they also fooled the doctors and were returned home. They arrived home a few months before their brother officers were released from Yozgat.

After returning to England, he wrote about the escape in The Road to En-Dor: Being an Account of How Two Prisoners of War at Yozgad in Turkey Won Their Way to Freedom, published in 1919. The book was reprinted seventeen times and then ran into three editions.

== Influences ==
The Road to En-dor was scripted for film in 2008 by Neil Gaiman and Penn Jillette (of Penn and Teller), and to be produced by Hilary Bevan Jones, the granddaughter of E. H. Jones. The project never advanced beyond looking for a director.

Mark Valentine included an essay on The Road to En-Dor in his collection, A Wild Tumultory Library (2019).

In 2021, American author Margalit Fox published The Confidence Men: How Two Prisoners of War Engineered the Most Remarkable Escape in History, a retelling of the events described in Jones's memoir with additional context and research.
