= St Andrew's Church, Tangmere =

Anglican church in Tangmere, West Sussex, England

Coordinates: 50.8480°N 0.7201°W

St Andrew, Tangmere
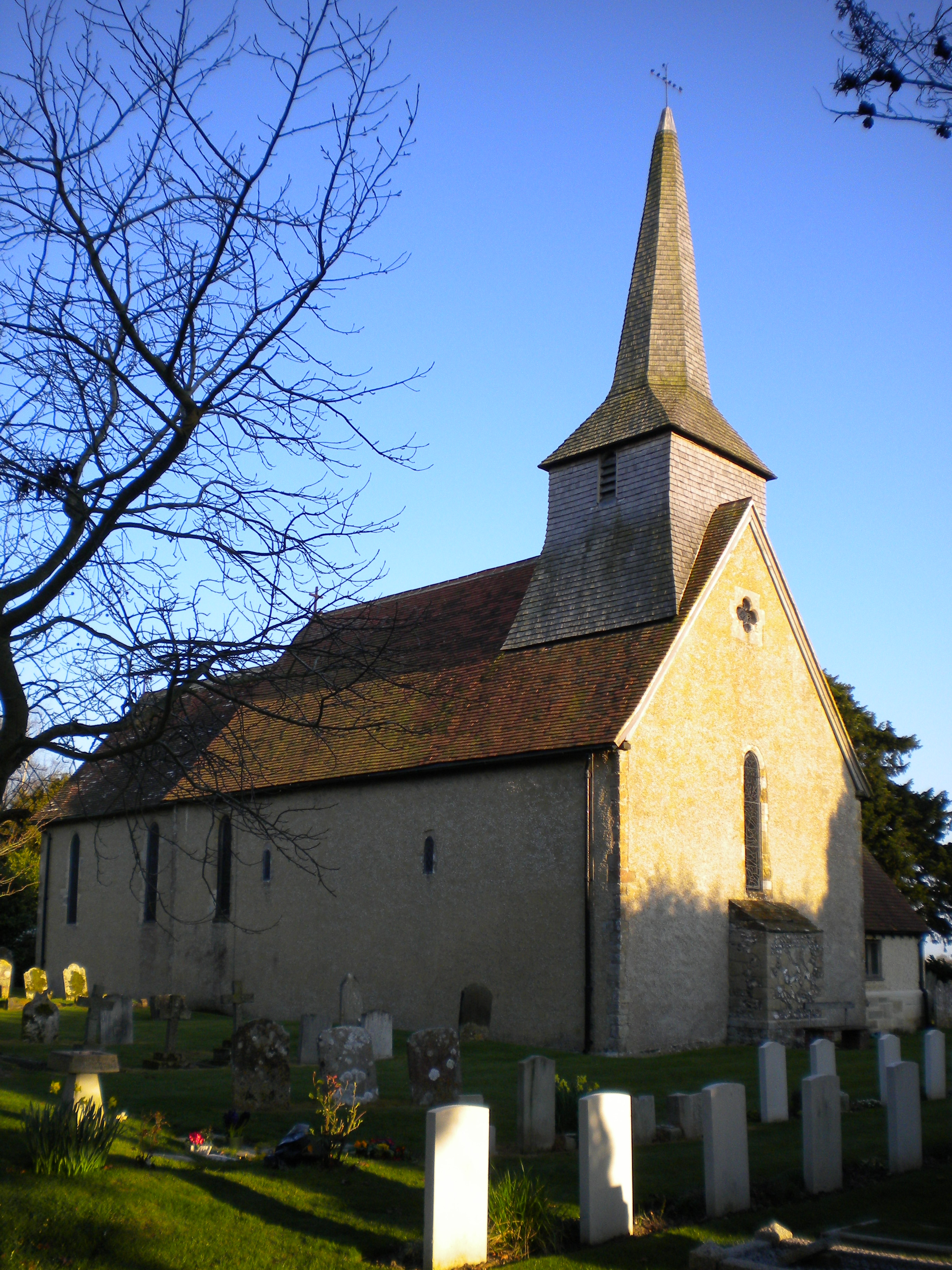
- St Andrew, Tangmere
- Denomination: Church of England

History
- Dedication: Saint Andrew

Administration
- Province: Canterbury
- Diocese: Chichester
- Archdeaconry: Chichester
- Deanery: Chichester
- Parish: Tangmere, St Andrew

Clergy
- Vicar: Revd Trevor Marshall

St Andrew's Church is a Church of England church, located in Tangmere, West Sussex. It lies within the Diocese of Chichester.

== Overview ==
The Saxon village lies a mile south of the Roman road of Stane Street, linking Londinium with Noviomagus Reginorum, now known as Chichester. The church however was built after the Norman Conquest.

Originally built of timber, the Saxon church was replaced in the 12th century by a stone and timber building with windows on the north and south sides. The bell turret is carried on a timber frame inside the nave. The chancel and chancel arch date from the 13th century, the arch having scalloped imposts similar to Oving church. A crude and badly weathered Saxon fragment, which may represent a beheading, forms the top of one of the Norman nave windows. There is a plain tub font. The size of the yew tree by the present door suggests an ancient sacred site.

In 1341, King Edward II granted the new Archbishop of Canterbury the right to hold a fair at Tangmere on St Andrew's Day. The event is still held by the church every autumn.

Having survived Luftwaffe bombing during World War II of the nearby RAF Tangmere, in October 2003 a freak lightning strike ripped the spire, damaged the roof and caused devastation inside the church. Still under repair, a limited-edition print Spirit of Tangmere showing a Supermarine Spitfire turning over the church to land was issued in 2003.

== Tangmere war graves ==
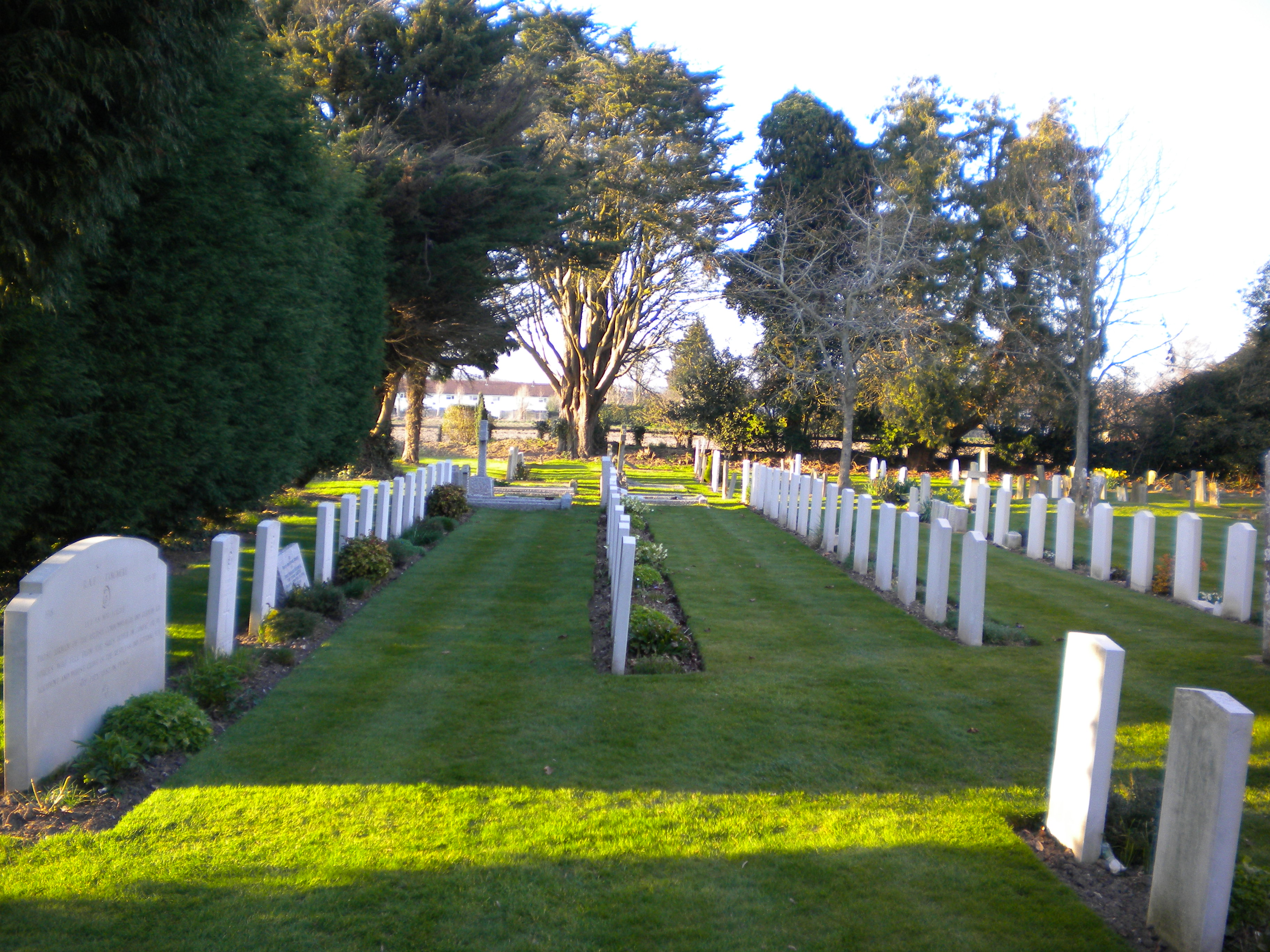
German (front right) and Commonwealth airmen's war graves at St Andrew's Church. The larger stone (front left) is a memorial to airmen of both sides lost at sea.

From 1917, a field directly adjacent to the church was the basis for a Royal Flying Corps base, extended into a Royal Air Force aerodrome. In 1939, in preparation for World War II, the airfield was enlarged to defend the south coast against the Luftwaffe. The base remained open until 1966.

Its close proximity to the RAF base meant that service personnel killed on or near the base were regularly buried within the church's graveyard. There are thirty nine Commonwealth burials of the 1939–1945 War, all airmen, one of whom is unidentified. There are thirteen Luftwaffe burials here, one of whom is unidentified. The majority of these airmen were killed during the Battle of Britain. Today, all of these graves are tended to by the Commonwealth War Graves Commission, with the Commonwealth war graves grouped in three rows on the western side of the church, and beside them the German graves.

Also within the churchyard are the graves of Air Commodore Edward "Teddy" Mortlock Donaldson CB CBE DSO AFC* LoM (1912–1992), an RAF World War II ace and for a time the holder of the Flight airspeed record, set in a Gloster Meteor in 1946 which took off and landed from RAF Tangmere, and Wing Commander John Simpson.

The new window in the St. Andrew's Church is dedicated to the memory of all men and women who gave their lives in service to their country.

== See also ==
- List of current places of worship in Chichester (district)
