= Edward Donaldson (RAF officer) =

RAF flying ace (1912-1992)

Edward "Teddy" Mortlock Donaldson
- Edward Mortlock Donaldson
- Born: 12 February 1912; Negeri Sembilan, British Malaya
- Died: 2 June 1992 (aged 80); Royal Naval Hospital Haslar, Hampshire
- Burial place: St Andrew's Church, Tangmere, West Sussex
- Military career
- Allegiance: United Kingdom
- Branch: Royal Air Force
- Service years: 1931–1961
- Rank: Air Commodore
- Nickname: Teddy
- Commands: RAF Flying College (1958–61); RAF Wunstorf (1951–53); RAF Fassberg (1951); High Speed Flight (1946–47); RAF Milfield (1944–46); RAF Colerne (1944); No. 151 Squadron (1938–40)
- Conflicts: Second World War: Battle of Dunkirk; Battle of Britain
- Awards: Companion of the Order of the Bath; Commander of the Order of the British Empire; Distinguished Service Order; Air Force Cross & Bar; Mentioned in Despatches; Officer of the Legion of Merit (United States)
- Other work: Air Correspondent for The Daily Telegraph

Air Commodore Edward "Teddy" Mortlock Donaldson, CB, CBE, DSO, AFC* (12 February 1912 – 2 June 1992) was a Royal Air Force (RAF) flying ace of the Second World War, and a former holder of the airspeed world record.

== Early life ==
Born in February 1912 in Negeri Sembilan, then part of British Malaya, his father C.E. Donaldson was a judge. One of four brothers, three of whom would serve as fighter pilots with the RAF and gain the Distinguished Service Order (DSO). Educated in England at the King's School, Rochester and Christ's Hospital, he then studied at McGill University in Canada.

Donaldson joined two of his brothers in the RAF in 1931. Granted a short service commission, his first posting was to No. 3 Squadron flying Bristol Bulldog fighters. In 1932 Donaldson was runner up in the RAF Wakefield Boxing Championship, which he won the following year. In 1933 and 1934 he won the RAF's Gunnery Trophy One, known as the Brooke-Popham Air Firing Trophy. In 1935 he became a stunt pilot as a member of the No. 3 Squadron aerobatic team of five Bulldogs, which he led in 1937 and 1938 at the International Zürich Rally.

== Second World War ==
When the Second World War broke out, Squadron Leader Donaldson was commanding No. 151 Squadron flying the Hawker Hurricane. In their first engagement over France, they destroyed six enemy aircraft, shooting down many more in the following months including at the Battle of Dunkirk. For his leadership of the squadron during the battle and his personal tally of eleven kills, plus ten probable destructions, Donaldson was awarded the DSO.

In desperate need of pilots, the RAF chose to transfer Donaldson to the gunnery instructor school. In September 1941 he was awarded the Air Force Cross in recognition of his work as an instructor. Posted to Canada, Donaldson wrote an RAF training booklet titled Notes on Air Gunnery and Air Fighting. As liaison to the US Army Air Force, his booklet was replicated over 7,500 times, and helped teach USAAF gunnery instructors.

On his return to England in 1944, he converted to jet aircraft and commanded the first operational Gloster Meteor squadron, at RAF Colerne.

== Postwar career ==
During the Second World War, most of the pre-war airspeed records had been broken. The RAF decided to recapture the flight airspeed record with its new generation of jet aircraft, and set up a new High Speed Flight squadron. Donaldson, now a group captain, was selected to command the Air Speed Flight, established at the start of 1946. On 7 September 1946, he established a new official world record of 615.78 mph (991.00 km/h) in a Gloster Meteor F.4 over Littlehampton, although some unofficial Me 262 and Me 163 flights in the Second World War achieved higher speeds. As a result, he was awarded a Bar to his Air Force Cross.

During the early 1950s, Donaldson served in West Germany and commanded RAF Fassberg and RAF Wunstorf airfields, gaining appointment to Commander of the Order of the British Empire in June 1953, and advancement to air commodore in July 1955 after attending the Joint Services Staff College. From 1956 to 1958 he served as Deputy Commander of Air Forces in the Arabian Peninsula. On return to England, his final appointment was as Commandant of the RAF College, Manby.

== Personal life ==
Donaldson married Winifred Constant in 1936, and the couple had two daughters. After they were divorced in 1944, in the same year he married Estellee Holland, an American nurse, and the couple had one son, David. After they divorced in 1954, he married Anne Sofie Stapleton in 1957, whom he divorced in 1982.

== Later life ==
Donaldson retired as an air commodore in 1961, and became the Air Correspondent for The Daily Telegraph, until 1979. He was a keen yachtsman owning a yacht which he kept in Gosport Marina. He retired to his home in Selsey, and died at the Royal Naval Hospital Haslar on 6 June 1992. Donaldson is buried at St Andrew's Church, Tangmere.

== Memorial ==
Donaldson's "Star" Meteor is on display at the Tangmere Military Aviation Museum, together with that of later 1953 record holder, Squadron Leader Neville Duke, who flew a Hawker Hunter at 727 miles per hour (1,170 km/h).

Donaldson was brought up at 86 Grafton Road, Selsey, where during 2000 a blue plaque was placed as part of the Selsey Heritage trail.

Donaldson's medals and flight books were sold at auction for £4,800 in June 2004.

== Service history ==
Date	Notes
26 June 1931	Appointed to a Short Service Commission. Initial Officer Training, RAF Depot
11 July 1931	U/T Pilot, No 2 FTS
20 June 1932	Pilot, No 3 Sqn.
23 April 1936	Supernumerary, RAF Depot.
22 March 1937	Act Officer Commanding, No 72 Sqn.
26 July 1937	Flight Commander, No 1 Sqn.
1937	Recommended for AFC, turned down
29 March 1938	Granted a Permanent Commission in the rank of Flight Lieutenant
5 May 1938	Attended Instructor's Course, Central Flying School. (graded B)
Aug 1938	QFI, No 7 FTS.
14 November 1938	Officer Commanding, No 151 Sqn.
5 August 1940	CFI, No 5 FTS.
Unknown	Officer Commanding, ? School
1 Jun 1941	Mentioned in Dispatches
30 September 1941	Awarded AFC
1941	Liaison Officer, USAAF (USA)
Unknown	Supernumerary, Polish Wing, RAF Northolt
Unknown	Group Captain, Fighter Control Unit, 2nd TAF.
1944	Attended Empire Central Flying School
Unknown	Officer Commanding, RAF Colerne
Unknown	Officer Commanding RAF Milfield
Jul 1946	Officer Commanding, RAF High Speed Flight
7 September 1946	Breaks Flight airspeed record, reaching 615.78 miles per hour (991.00 km/h) in a Gloster Meteor F Mk4 over Littlehampton.
1947	SASO, HQ No 12 Group
12 June 1947	Awarded AFC Bar
15 February 1949	Awarded Legion of Merit, USA
1951	Officer Commanding, RAF Fassberg
Unknown	Officer Commanding, RAF Wunstorf
1 June 1953	Awarded CBE
16 April 1954	Director of Operational Training
11 December 1956	Deputy Commander, HQ British Forces, Arabian Peninsula
12 November 1958	AOC/Commandant, RAF Flying College
1 January 1960	Awarded Companion of the Bath in New Year Honours
21 March 1961	Retired

== Combat record ==
The following table is not complete in numbers or detail.

Date	Service	Flying	Kills	Probables	Notes
17 May 1940	Royal Air Force	Hurricane	2 * Junkers Ju 87	1 * Junkers Ju 87	50miles east of Valenciennes
18 May 1940	Royal Air Force	Hurricane		1 * Messerschmitt Bf 110	Over Vitry-en-Artois airfield
22 May 1940	Royal Air Force	Hurricane	1 * Junkers Ju 87	1 * Junkers Ju 87	Over Merville
29 May 1940	Royal Air Force	Hurricane	1/2 * Junkers Ju 88		
30 May 1940	Royal Air Force	Hurricane		1 * Junkers Ju 88	Gazetted for DSO
1 June 1940	Royal Air Force	Hurricane	1 * Messerschmitt Bf 110		Battle of Dunkirk
2 June 1940	Royal Air Force	Hurricane			Squadron moved from France to RAF Tangmere
27 June 1940	Royal Air Force	Hurricane			On return from France protecting squadron of Basil Embry, shot down over English Channel
12 July 1940	Royal Air Force	Hurricane			Commencement of the Battle of Britain. Shot down over England by Dornier Do 17, lands RAF Martlesham Heath
14 July 1940	Royal Air Force	Hurricane	1 * Messerschmitt Bf 109		Over Dover Straits
26 July 1940	Royal Air Force	Hurricane			Final flight of Battle of Britain
27 July 1940	Royal Air Force				Given leave, on return posted to No. 5 F.T.S. as Chief Flying Instructor
TOTALS			5.5 kills	4 probable	
