= Jinnah: Creator of Pakistan =

1954 biography by Hector Bolitho

- Author: Hector Bolitho
- Language: English
- Subject: Muhammad Ali Jinnah; Pakistan Movement
- Genre: Biography
- Publisher: John Murray
- Publication date: 1954
- Publication place: United Kingdom
- Media type: Print
- Pages: 244
- LC Class: 54-14996

Jinnah: Creator of Pakistan is a 1954 biography by Hector Bolitho about Muhammad Ali Jinnah, the founder of Pakistan. Published in London by John Murray, it was the official biography of Jinnah and was later reprinted several times, including by Oxford University Press in Pakistan.

== Synopsis ==
The book presents a narrative account of Jinnah's life and political career, built from anecdotes and assessments gathered from his colleagues and acquaintances. Bolitho structured these recollections around the domestic events of Jinnah's life and the major political events in which he played a dominant part.

The biography traces Jinnah from his family background and legal career into his leadership of the All-India Muslim League and the creation of Pakistan. It was based in part on interviews recorded only a few years after Jinnah's death.

== Reception ==
The book remained influential in Jinnah studies for decades.

In a review in the Abasyn Journal of Social Sciences, Amir Nawaz described Jinnah: Creator of Pakistan as one of the most readable and vivid sketches of Jinnah and praised Bolitho's treatment of his early life and public career. Later historians were more critical. Reviewing Stanley Wolpert's Jinnah of Pakistan, Leslie Wolf-Phillips called Wolpert's biography "a long-overdue and authoritative alternative" to Bolitho's "flawed" book.
