= C. W. Hill =

Australian officer

- Born: 3 April 1891; Warwick, Australia
- Died: 5 March 1975 (aged 83); Windsor, England
- Military career
- Allegiance: United Kingdom
- Branch: British Army (1915–1918); Royal Air Force (1918–1944)
- Service years: 1915–1944
- Rank: Group Captain
- Commands: RAF Tangmere (1937); No. 1 Squadron (1934–1936, 1936–1937)
- Conflicts: First World War; Second World War
- Awards: Mentioned in Despatches

Cedric Waters Hill (3 April 1891 – 5 March 1975) was an Australian officer in the Royal Flying Corps and later the Royal Air Force who, together with E. H. Jones, escaped from the Yozgat prisoner of war camp in Turkey during the First World War. Their epic story was told in Jones' book The Road to En-dor and in his own book The Spook and the Commandant.

Between February 1917 and October 1918, Jones and Hill convinced their Turkish captors that they were mediums adept at the Ouija board. Taking advantage of the greed of the Turkish camp Commandant, with promises of buried treasure via the Ouija board, the two men managed to engineer the circumstances of their imprisonment to favour their escape. Eventually they convinced their gaolers to repatriate them by feigning insanity, arriving home only a few months before the Armistice.

Hill continued his career in the RAF after the war. Granted a short service commission as a flying officer on 6 December 1920, he was promoted flight lieutenant in January 1923 and appointed to a permanent commission six months later. He was advanced to squadron leader in 1931. Hill commanded No. 1 Squadron from October 1934 to January 1936 and again from December that year until April 1937. That same month, he was promoted to wing commander and appointed to command RAF Tangmere. He was made an acting group captain from 1 June 1940, during the Second World War, and retired from the RAF in 1944. Hill then worked as a ferry pilot for the Air Transport Auxiliary.

On 5 March 1975, Hill died at his home in Windsor, Berkshire. He was survived by his wife and daughter.
