= Hector Bolitho =

English writer (1897–1974)

Bolitho in 1948.

Henry Hector Bolitho (28 May 1897 – 12 September 1974) was a New Zealand writer, novelist and biographer, who had 59 books published. Widely travelled, he spent most of his career in England.

== Biography ==
Hector Bolitho was born and educated in Auckland, New Zealand, the son of Henry and Ethelred Frances Bolitho. He travelled in the South Sea Islands in 1919 and then through New Zealand with the Prince of Wales in 1920.

Bolitho lived in Sydney from 1921 to 1923, where he became editor of the Shakespearean Quarterly and literary editor and drama critic of the Evening News in Sydney.

He also travelled in Africa, Canada, America, and Germany in 1923-4, finally settling in Britain where he was to remain for the rest of his life.

On his arrival in Britain he worked as a freelance journalist; in 1927 he also provided a glowing introduction to (former journalist of the Evening News and future crime writer) Max Murray's first book, a sea voyage called The World's Back Doors (Jonathan Cape, 1927), the sixty-first book in Jonathan Cape's Traveller's Library series.

At the start of World War II he joined the Royal Air Force Volunteer Reserve (RAFVR) as an intelligence officer with the rank of squadron leader, editing the Royal Air Force Weekly Bulletin, which in 1941 became the Royal Air Force Journal. In 1942 he was appointed editor of the Coastal Command Intelligence Review.

Bolitho undertook several lecture tours of America (in 1938–39, 1947, 1948, and 1949) and he also revisited Australia in later years. Bolitho was contracted by the Government of Pakistan to write a biography of Jinnah. The project became complicated as access to the archives was restricted and the government required changes to the draft prior to publication. The book was published to mixed reviews in 1954. Nevertheless the book has been widely cited.

In his forties, Bolitho shared his life and his home with John Simpson. Hector described John as his ‘secretary’, which was then a common euphemism for gay partner. Simpson later died and his long-term partner was Derek Peel, an army officer. They met in 1949 and were together until Bolitho's death in 1974.

Bolitho is referenced in fictional form as "Hector Bolithiero" in the Denton Welch short story "Brave and Cruel".

The name Bolitho is of Cornish origin.

== Bibliography ==
- The Island of Kawau: A Record, Descriptive and Historical, 1919
- Tramps in the Far North: The Record of a Tour in Whangarei, Russell and Whangaroa, 1919
- The Islands of Wonder, 1920
- With the Prince in New Zealand, 1920
- Solemn Boy (novel), 1927
- The Letters of Lady Augusta Stanley (editor, with The Dean of Windsor), 1927
- Thistledown and Thunder: A Higgledy-Piggledy Diary of New Zealand, The South Seas, Australia, Port Said, Italy, Canada and New York, 1928
- The New Zealanders, 1928
- Judith Silver (novel), 1929
- The New Countries, 1929
- The Later Letters of Lady Augusta Stanley (editor with The Dean of Windsor), 1929
- The Glorious Oyster, 1929
- A Very Early Victorian Christmas (privately published edition of 300 copies), 1929
- A Victorian Dean: A Memoir of Arthur Stanley (with Very Rev. A. V. Baillie), 1930
- The Flame on Ethirdova (novel), 1930
- Albert the Good: A Life of the Prince Consort, 1932
- Alfred Mond: First Baron Melchett. A Biography, 1933
- Beside Galilee: A Diary in Palestine, 1933
- The Prince Consort and his Brother, 1934
- Victoria, the Widow and her Son, 1934
- Grey Farm (play; with Terence Rattigan), performed 1934
- Twelve Jews, 1935
- Older People, 1935
- The House in Half Moon Street (short stories), 1935
- James Lyle MacKay, First Earl of Inchcape, 1936
- Marie Tempest. A Biography, 1936
- King Edward VIII: His Life and Reign, 1937
- Royal Progress: 1837-1937, 1937
- George VI, 1937
- Victoria and Albert, 1938
- Further Letters of Queen Victoria (editor), 1938
- Victoria and Disraeli (radio play), performed 1938
- The Emigrants (with John Mulgan), 1939
- Roumania under King Carol, 1939
- America Expects, 1940
- War in the Strand, 1942
- Combat Report: The Story of a Fighter Pilot, 1943
  - republished as Finest of the Few: The Story of Battle of Britain Fighter Pilot John Simpson, 2010
- A Batsford Century: The Record of a Hundred Years of Publishing and Bookselling, 1843-1943 (editor), 1943
- No Humour in My Love (short stories), 1946
- Task for Coastal Command, 1946
- The Romance of Windsor Castle, 1947
- Thirty Years, 1947
- The British Empire (editor), 1947–48
- The Reign of Queen Victoria, 1948
- A Biographer's Notebook, 1950
- A Century of British Monarchy, 1951
- Their Majesties, 1951
- Without the City Wall: An Adventure in London Street-Names, North of the River (with Derek Peel), 1952
- The Coronation Book of Queen Elizabeth II (chapter entitled The New Elizabethans), 1953
- Jinnah: Creator of Pakistan, 1954
- A Penguin in the Eyrie: An R.A.F. Diary 1939-1945, 1955
- The Wine of the Douro, 1956
- The Angry Neighbours, 1957
- No 10, Downing Street, 1957
- "Gilbert Harding in Brighton"; Gilbert Harding by his Friends, (ed. S. Grenfell), 1961
- My Restless Years (autobiography), 1962
- A Summer in Germany: A Diary, 1963
- The Galloping Third: The Story of The 3rd The King's Own Hussars, 1963
- Albert, Prince Consort 1964, rev. edn, 1970
- The Drummonds of Charing Cross (with Derek Peel), 1967

== Biographies ==
- Fairgray, Joyce (2009). Windsor Reserve to Windsor Castle: Hector Bolitho 1897–1974. North Shore City, N.Z.: Devonport Library Associates. ISBN 9780473148645. OCLC 319859827.
