= Tangmere Military Aviation Museum =

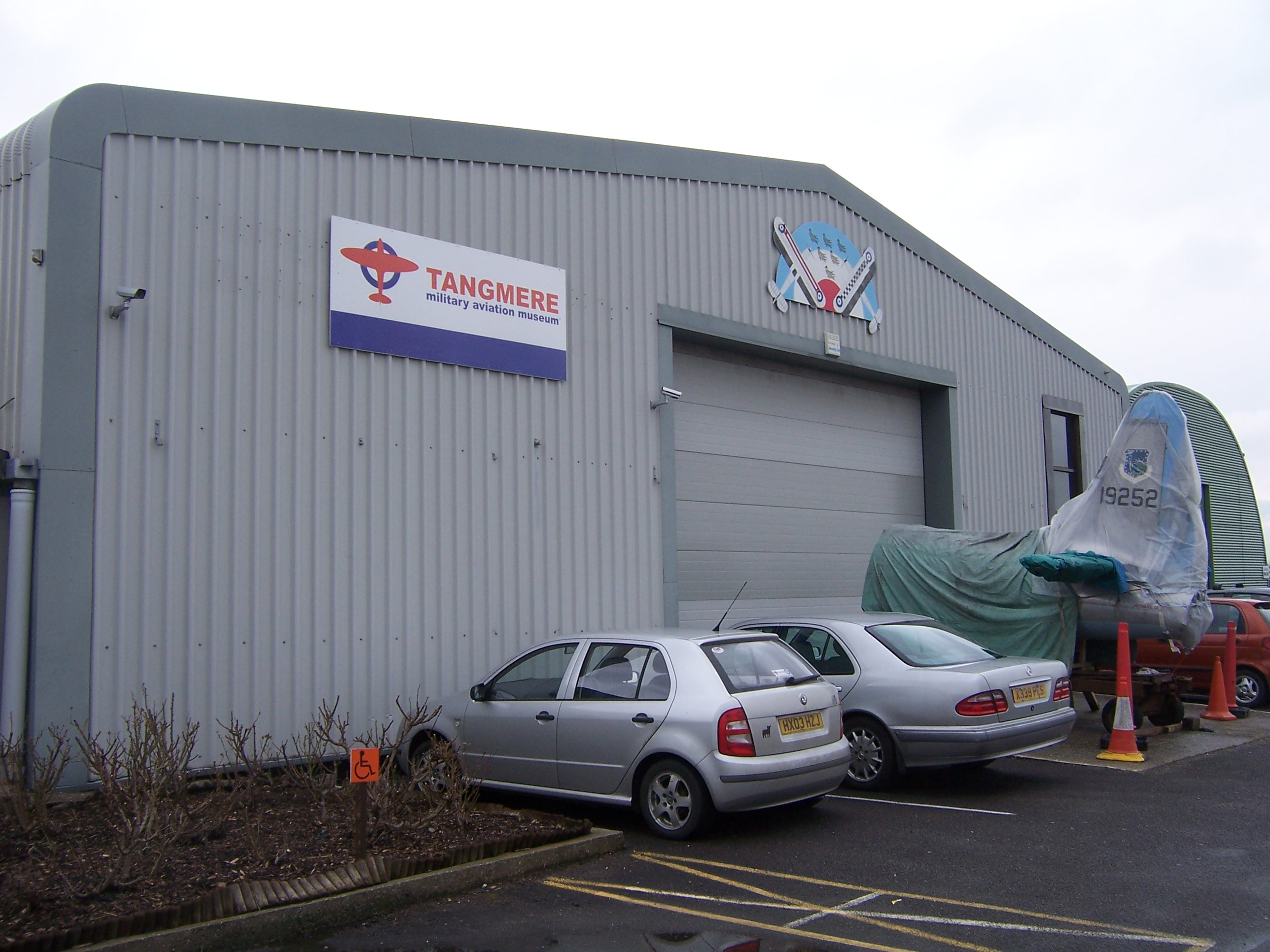

- Location within West Sussex
- Established: 1982
- Location: Tangmere, West Sussex
- Coordinates: 50.8467°N 0.7147°W
- Type: Aviation museum
- Website: www.tangmere-museum.org.uk

The Tangmere Military Aviation Museum is a museum located on the former site of RAF Tangmere, West Sussex. The museum was opened in June 1982. Many aerospace exhibits covering the First World War to the Cold War are on display including fixed-wing aircraft, helicopters and aircraft engines.

== Aircraft on display ==
The museum aircraft are housed in two hangars with a small number on display externally. Several exhibits are on loan from the Royal Air Force Museum including the Hawker Hunter used by Neville Duke to break the airspeed record in 1953.

=== Piston engine aircraft ===
- Hawker Hurricane L1679 – replica in the markings of 1 Squadron RAF coded JX-G
- Supermarine Spitfire K5054 – replica
- Westland Lysander – V9822 - replica in the markings of 161 Squadron RAF coded MA-E

=== Jet aircraft ===
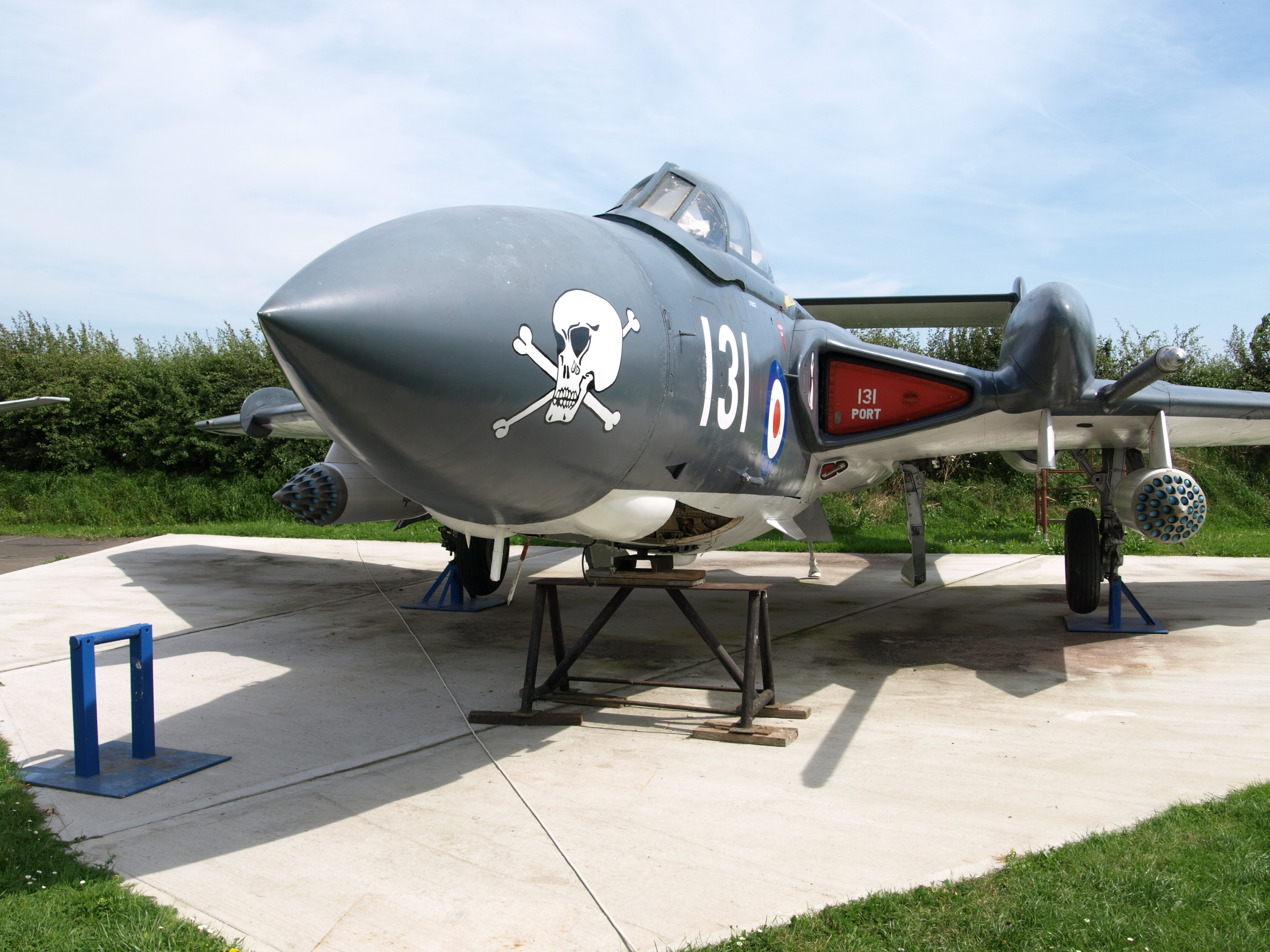
de Havilland Sea Vixen

- BAe Sea Harrier F/A.2 XZ459 in Royal Navy markings
- de Havilland Sea Vixen FAW.2 XJ580 in the markings of 899 Naval Air Squadron Fleet Air Arm
- de Havilland Vampire T.11 XH313
- English Electric Lightning F.53 ZF578 in the marking so 23 Squadron RAF as XR753 coded A'
- Gloster Meteor F.4 EE549
- Hawker Hunter F.3 WB188
- Hawker Hunter F.5 WP190 in the markings of 1 Squadron RAF coded K
- Hawker Siddeley Harrier GR.3 XV744
- McDonnell Douglas Phantom FGR.2 XV408 in the markings of 6 Squadron RAF coded L
- Supermarine Swift FR.5 WK281

=== Aircraft cockpits ===
- de Havilland Canada Chipmunk T.10 WZ876
- English Electric Canberra B.2 WE113
- Hawker Hunter F.4 WV332
- Percival Provost T.1 XF840
- Royal Aircraft Factory S.E.5A – replica
- Supermarine Spitfire IX – under construction

=== Helicopters ===
- Westland Wessex HU.5 XS511

== Simulators ==
- Air Combat Simulator
- English Electric Lightning
- Red Simulators

== Aircraft engines ==
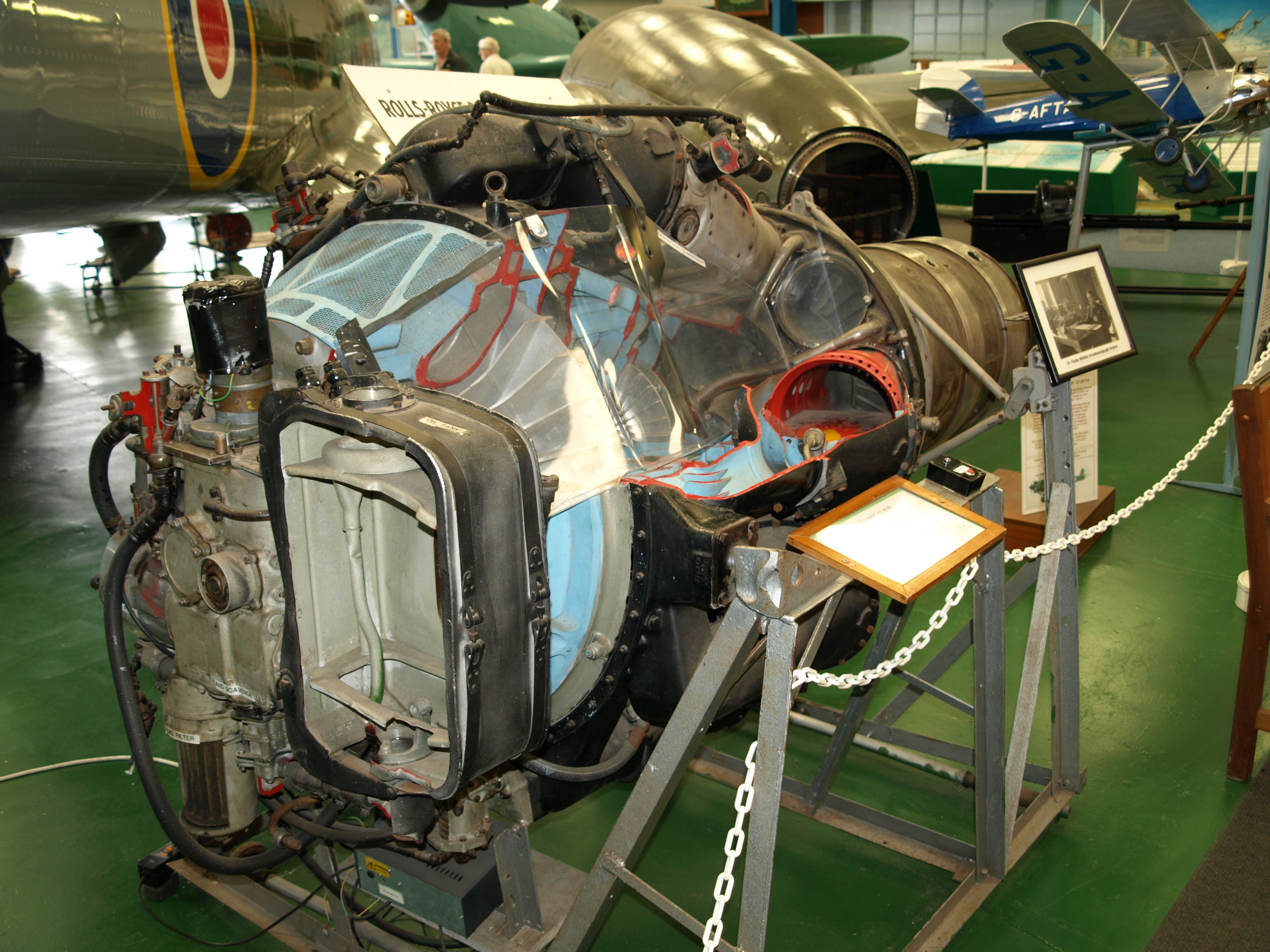
Rolls-Royce Derwent on display

=== Piston engines ===
- Rolls-Royce Griffon

=== Gas turbine engines ===
- Rolls-Royce Derwent
- Rolls-Royce Nene
- Rolls-Royce Palouste

== See also ==
- List of aerospace museums
