= RAF Tangmere =

Former Royal Air Force station in West Sussex, England

RAF Tangmere
- Tangmere, West Sussex in England
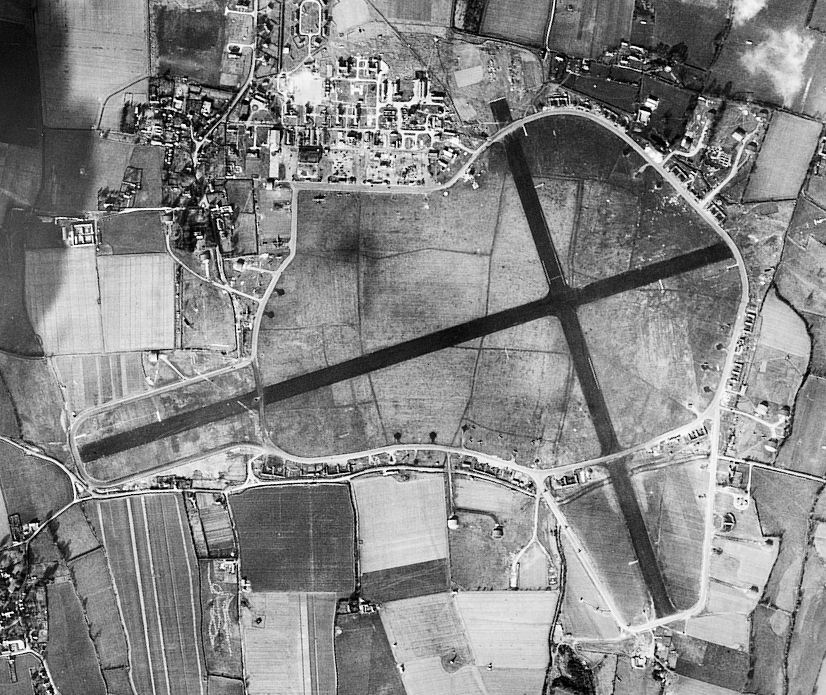
- Aerial photograph of Tangmere airfield, 10 February 1944

- Station badge

Site information
- Type: Royal Air Force Sector Station
- Code: RN
- Owner: Ministry of Defence
- Operator: Royal Flying Corps 1917; U.S. Signal Corps 1918–19; Royal Air Force 1919–20; 1925-1970; Fleet Air Arm 1942–48
- Controlled by: RAF Fighter Command; No. 11 Group RAF; RAF Second Tactical Air Force; No. 84 Group RAF; RAF Signals Command 1958-
- Open to the public: Yes

Location
- Location in West Sussex
- Coordinates: 50°50′45″N 000°42′23″W
- Grid reference: SU910060

Site history
- Built: 25 September 1917 & 1927–30
- In use: 1917–20; 1925– October 16, 1970
- Battles/wars: First World War; European theatre of the Second World War
- Events: Battle of Britain

Garrison information
- Past commanders: C. W. Hill
- Designations: Grade II

Airfield information
- Elevation: 15 metres (49 ft) AMSL
Runways
Direction	Length and surface
07/25	1,828.75 metres (6,000 ft) Concrete
17/35	1,463 metres (4,800 ft) Concrete

Royal Air Force Tangmere or more simply RAF Tangmere is a former Royal Air Force station located in Tangmere, England, famous for its role in the Battle of Britain.

It was one of several stations near Chichester, West Sussex. The Second World War aces Wing Commander Douglas Bader, and the then inexperienced Johnnie Johnson were stationed at Tangmere in 1941.

== History ==
=== First World War ===
The aerodrome was founded in 1917 for use by the Royal Flying Corps as a training base. In August 1918 it was sold to the US Government and turned over to the Aviation Section, U.S. Signal Corps (USSC) as a training ground for US-built Handley-Page O/400 biplane bombers, although almost none were completed by the time of the Armistice. The Aviation Section of the American Expeditionary Forces (ASAEF) agreed to improve the airfield and constructed further hangars. Tangmere continued to host the 92d Aero Squadron until the end of the Great War in November 1918, after which the airfield was put up for sale at the end of 1919.

Additional units:

- No. 14 Squadron RAF during 1919
- No. 32 Squadron RAF during 1919
- No. 40 Squadron RAF during 1919
- No. 41 Squadron RAF during 1919
- No. 82 (United Provinces) Squadron RAF during 1919
- No. 84 Squadron RAF during 1919
- No. 91 (Nigeria) Squadron RAF during 1918-19
- No. 92 (East India) Squadron RAF during 1918
- No. 93 Squadron RAF during 1918
- No. 148 Squadron RAF during 1919
- No. 207 Squadron RAF during 1919
- No. 40 Training Squadron (1916)
- No. 61 Training Depot Station (1918-19) became No. 61 Training Squadron (1919)

=== Interwar years ===
Responsibility for the Air Defence of Great Britain (ADGB) passed from the War Department to the Air Ministry, and Tangmere, in its finished state, was one of the first airfields to be re-activated. By the end of 1923 it was re-purchased by the Crown and in 1925 the station re-opened to serve the RAF's new fighter capability. It went operational in late 1926 with No. 43 Squadron from RAF Henlow equipped with biplane Gloster Gamecocks. They were joined by a nucleus of officers from 1 Squadron and a friendly rivalry grew up between the two squadrons., who later flew Armstrong Whitworth Siskins.

As war threatened in the late 1930s, the fighter aircraft based at Tangmere became faster, with Hawker Furies, Gloster Gladiators, and Hawker Hurricanes all being used.

In 1934, Squadron Leader C W Hill, a famous First World War prisoner-of-war escaper, commanded No. 1 Fighter Squadron at RAF Tangmere. Two years later, as a Wing Commander, he became the station commander.

Additional units:

- Coastal Area Storage Unit (1925–28)
- 1 Squadron between 1927–39
- 43 Squadron between 1926–39

=== Second World War ===
In a memoir, Peter Townsend (noted Battle of Britain pilot and, post-war, romantically linked with Princess Margaret), recounts the arrival of 605 Squadron at Tangmere, just before the outbreak of war. Townsend says that

Things hummed at Tangmere Cottage, just opposite the guard room, where 605's commanding officer John Willoughby de Broke and his wife Rachel kept open house. There we spent wild evenings, drinking, singing, dancing to romantic tunes . . . we danced blithely, relentlessly towards catastrophe. . . . With one chance in five of survival - not counting the burnt and the wounded - only a handful of us would come through.

In 1939 the airfield was enlarged to defend the south coast against attack by the Luftwaffe, with Tangmere's only hotel and some houses being demolished in the process. The RAF commandeered the majority of houses in the centre of the village, with only six to eight families being allowed to stay. The village would not resume its status as a civilian community until 1966.

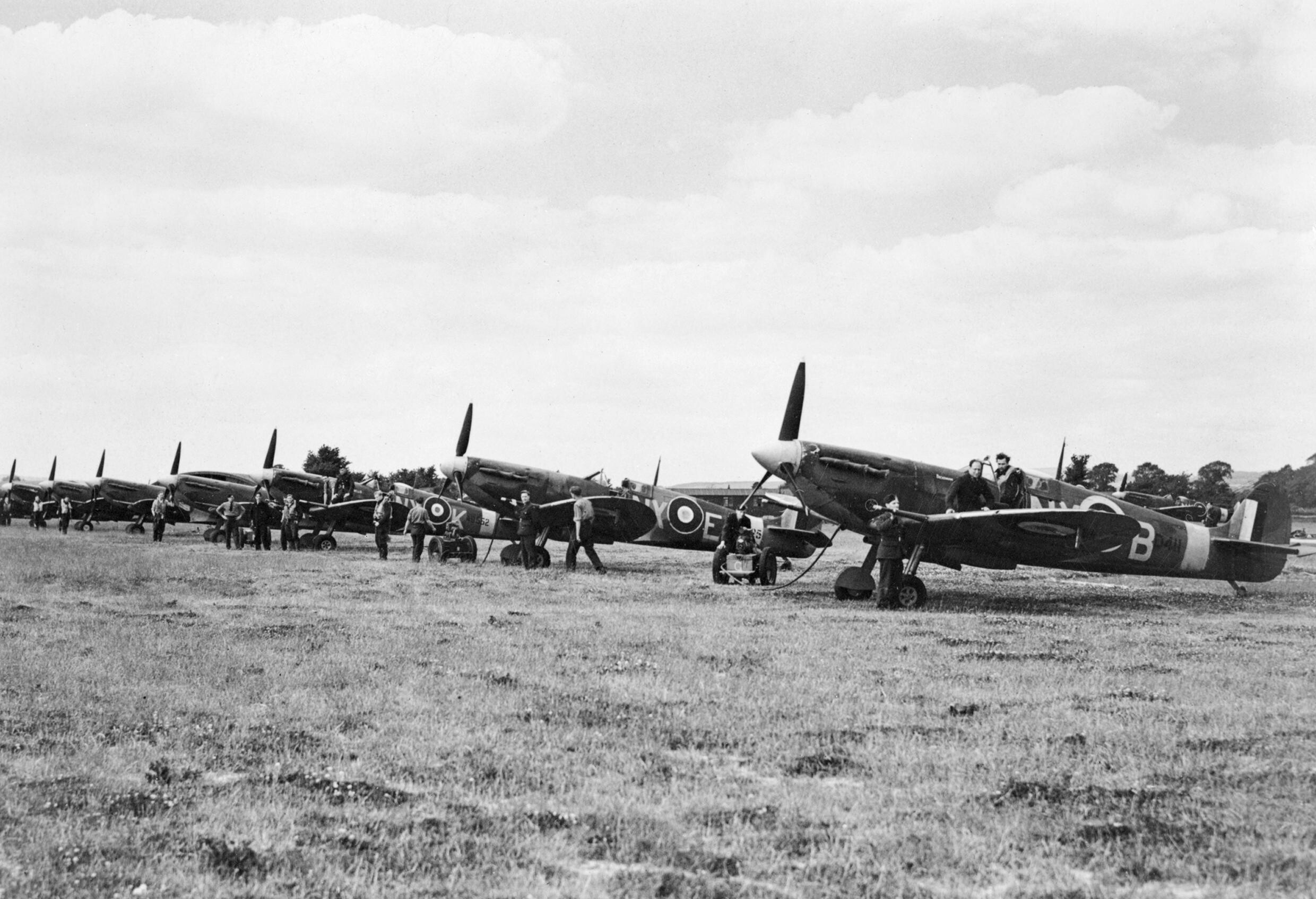
A line of Supermarine Spitfire Mark VBs of No. 131 Squadron RAF, being prepared for a sweep at Merston, a satellite airfield of Tangmere

In August 1940 the first squadron (No. 602 Squadron RAF) of Supermarine Spitfires was based at satellite airfield RAF Westhampnett, as the Battle of Britain began. By now the villagers had mainly been evacuated, and extensive ranges of RAF buildings had sprung up.

The first, and worst, enemy raid on the station came on 16 August 1940 when hundreds of Junkers Ju 87 (Stuka) dive bombers and fighters crossed the English coast and attacked Tangmere. There was extensive damage to buildings and aircraft on the ground and 14 ground staff and six civilians were killed. However the station was kept in service and brought back into full operation.

Throughout the war, the station was used by the Royal Air Force Special Duty Service when 161 (Special Duty) Squadron's Westland Lysander flight came down to do their insertion and pick-up operations into occupied Europe. The SOE used Tangmere Cottage, opposite the main entrance to the base to house and receive their agents. Today the cottage sports a commemorative plaque to its former secret life.

Later in the war, as the RAF turned from defence to attack, Group Captain Douglas Bader, the legless fighter ace, commanded the Tangmere wing of Fighter Command. Today he is commemorated by a plaque outside the former Bader Arms public house, now a Co-operative Food outlet in the village. 616 Squadron, which included Johnnie Johnson and Hugh Dundas, arrived at Tangmere in late February 1941. Johnson went on to become the highest scoring Western Allied fighter ace against the Luftwaffe.

For D-Day, the RAF created Airfield Headquarters units which transformed into wings to control multiple similar squadrons for offensive actions for eventual use in mainland Europe.

- No. 23 (Fighter) Wing RAF (1944) controlling:
  - No. 146 Airfield Headquarters RAF (January 1944)
    - No. 183 (Gold Coast) Squadron RAF with the Typhoon Ib during 1943 & 44
    - No. 197 Squadron RAF with the Typhoon Ib during 1943 & 44
    - No. 257 (Burma) Squadron RAF with the Typhoon Ib during 1944
- No. 126 Airfield Headquarters RAF (May 1944) became No. 126 (RCAF) (Fighter) Wing RAF (May - June 1944)
  - No. 401 (Ram) Squadron RCAF with the Spitfire IXb during 1944
  - No. 411 (Grizzly Bear) Squadron RCAF with the Spitfire IXb during 1944
  - No. 412 (Falcon) Squadron RCAF with the Spitfire Vb & IXb during 1942 & 44
- No. 127 Airfield Headquarters RAF (April - May 1944) became No. 127 (RCAF) (Fighter) Wing RAF (May - June 1944)
  - No. 403 Squadron RCAF with the Spitfire IXb during 1944
  - No. 416 Squadron RCAF with the Spitfire IXb during 1944
  - No. 421 Squadron RCAF with the Spitfire IXb during 1944
- No. 132 (Norwegian) (Fighter) Wing RAF (June - July 1944)
  - No. 66 Squadron RAF with the Spitfire Vb, Vc & LFIXb during 1942 & 44
  - No. 127 Squadron RAF with the Spitfire LFIXe during 1944
  - No. 331 (Norwegian) Squadron RAF with the Spitfire IXb during 1944
  - No. 332 (Norwegian) Squadron RAF with the Spitfire IXb during 1944
- No. 134 (Czech) (Fighter) Wing RAF (June - July 1944)
  - No. 33 Squadron RAF with the Sptifire LFIXe during 1944
  - No. 74 (Trinidad) Squadron RAF with the Spitfire LFIXe during 1944
  - No. 127 Squadron RAF with the Spitfire LFIXe during 1944
  - No. 310 (Czechoslovak) Squadron RAF with the Spitfire LFIX during 1944
  - No. 312 (Czechoslovak) Squadron RAF with the Spitfire HFIX during 1944
  - No. 313 (Czechoslovak) Squadron RAF with the Spitfire IX during 1944
- No. 135 (Fighter) Wing RAF (August 1944)
  - No. 222 (Natal) Squadron RAF with the Spitfire LFIXb during 1944
  - No. 349 (Belgian) Squadron RAF with the Spitfire LFIXe during 1944
  - No. 485 (NZ) Squadron RAF with the Spitfire IXe during 1944
- No. 145 (French) (Fighter) Wing RAF (August 1944)
  - No. 74 (Trinidad) Squadron RAF with the Spitfire LFIXe during 1944
  - No. 329 (GC I/2 'Cicognes') Squadron RAF with the Spitfire IX during 1944
  - No. 340 (GC IV/2 'IIe de France) Squadron RAF with the Spitfire IXb during 1944
  - No. 341 (G.C.III/2 'Alsace') Squadron RAF with the Spitfire IXb during 1944

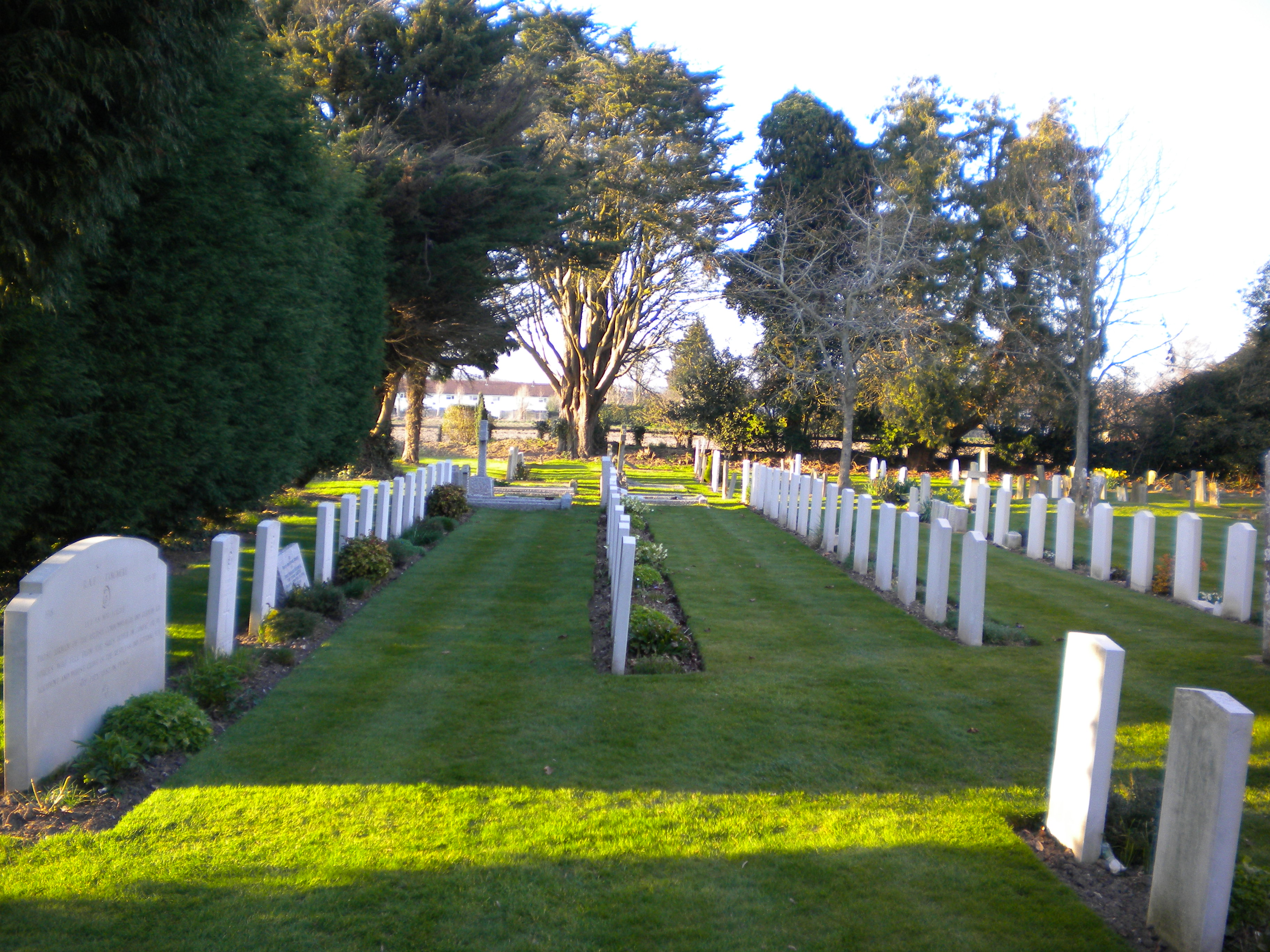
German (right) and Commonwealth pilot graves at St Andrew's Church, Tangmere; the large tombstone is a memorial to pilots lost at sea.

Many of those killed at the base, from both sides in conflict, are buried in the cemetery at St Andrew's Church, Tangmere, today tended by the Commonwealth War Graves Commission. United American RAF pilot Billy Fiske who died at Tangmere in 1940 was one of the first American aviators to die during the Second World War.

Defensive units (1939–41):

- 1 Squadron during 1940 & 41
- No. 17 Squadron RAF with the Hurricane during 1940
- No. 42 Squadron RAF detachment during 1938
- 43 Squadron during 1940
- No. 65 (East India) Squadron RAF with the Spitfire during 1940 & 41
- No. 72 Squadron RAF during 1937
- No. 87 (United Provinces) Squadron RAF during 1937
- No. 92 (East India) Squadron RAF during 1939
- No. 145 Squadron RAF with the Spitfire I, IIa during 1940 & 41
- No. 213 (Ceylon) Squadron RAF with the Hurricane I during 1940
- No. 217 Squadron RAF during 1937, 38 & 39
- No. 238 Squadron RAF with the Spitfire I during 1940
- No. 501 (County of Gloucester) Squadron AAF with the Hurricane I, Spitfire Vb & Vc during 1939, 40 & 42
- No. 601 (County of London) Squadron AAF with the Blenheim If & Hurricane I during 1940
- No. 605 (County of Warwick) Squadron AAF with the Gladiator I & Hurricane I during 1939 & 40
- No. 607 (County of Durham) Squadron AAF with the Hurricane I during 1940
- No. 614 (County of Glamorgan) Squadron AAF detachment during 1940

Offensive units (1941–45):

- 1 Squadron during 1942
- No. 23 Squadron RAF, detachment during 1941
- No. 26 (South African) Squadron RAF during 1944
- No. 41 Squadron RAF with the Spitfire Vb, XII during 1942, 43 & 44
- 43 Squadron during 1942
- No. 56 Squadron RAF detachment during 1942
- No. 82 (United Provinces) Squadron RAF Detachment 1939–42
- No. 91 (Nigeria) Squadron RAF with the Spitfire XII during 1943–44
- No. 96 Squadron RAF detachment between 1942-43
- No. 118 Squadron RAF with the Spitfire Vb during 1942
- No. 124 (Baroda) Squadron RAF with the Spitfire VI during 1942
- No. 129 (Mysore) Squadron RAF with the Spitfire Vb during 1943
- No. 130 (Punjab) Squadron RAF with the Spitfire XIV during 1944
- No. 131 (County of Kent) Squadron RAF with the Spitfire Vb during 1942
- No. 141 Squadron RAF with the Beaufighter If during 1942
- 161 Squadron detachment during 1942 with the Lysander
- No. 164 (Argentine–British) Squadron RAF detachment 1942–43
- No. 165 (Ceylon) Squadron RAF with the Spitfire Vb during 1942 & 43
- No. 168 Squadron RAF detachment during 1942
- No. 170 Squadron RAF detachment during 1943
- No. 198 Squadron RAF with the Typhoon Ib during 1944
- No. 219 (Mysore) Squadron RAF with the Blenheim If & Beaufighter If during 1940, 41 & 42
- No. 222 (Natal) Squadron RAF with the Spitfire LFIXb during 1944
- No. 229 Squadron RAF with the Spitfire LFIXb during 1944
- No. 266 (Rhodesia) Squadron RAF with the Typhoon Ib during 1944
- No. 268 Squadron RAF detachment during 1943
- No. 302 Polish Fighter Squadron during 1943
- No. 486 (NZ) Squadron RAF with the Typhoon Ib during 1942, 43 & 44
- No. 534 Squadron RAF with the Boston during 1942 & 43
- No. 609 (West Riding) Squadron AAF with the Typhoon Ib during 1944
- 616 Squadron during 1941
- 823 Naval Air Squadron, Fleet Air Arm (1942–43) (Helping RAF Coastal Command ASW patrols)
- 841 Naval Air Squadron detachment No. 4, Fleet Air Arm (1943) (Helping RAF Coastal Command ASW patrols)

Units:

- No. 2 Air Delivery Letter Service (June 1944)
- Detachment of No. 11 Group Anti-Aircraft Co-operation Flight (1941)
- No. 410 Repair & Salvage Unit (1944)
- No. 419 (Special Duties) Flight RAF (1940)
- No. 1455 (Fighter) Flight RAF (1941-42)
- No. 3205 Servicing Commando (1944)
- No. 3207 Servicing Commando (1943)
- No. 3210 Servicing Commando (1944)
- No. 3225 Servicing Commando (1943)
- Fighter Interception Unit RAF (1940)

RAF Regiment:

The following RAF Regiment units were also here at some point:

- No. 1304 Mobile Wing RAF Regiment
- No. 1305 Mobile Wing RAF Regiment
- No. 1315 Mobile Wing RAF Regiment
- No. 2702 Squadron RAF Regiment
- No. 2704 Squadron RAF Regiment
- No. 2720 Squadron RAF Regiment
- No. 2723 Squadron RAF Regiment
- No. 2748 Squadron RAF Regiment
- No. 2760 Squadron RAF Regiment
- No. 2786 Squadron RAF Regiment
- No. 2789 Squadron RAF Regiment
- No. 2795 Squadron RAF Regiment
- No. 2813 Squadron RAF Regiment
- No. 2832 Squadron RAF Regiment
- No. 2894 Squadron RAF Regiment
- No. 4016 Anti-Aircraft Flight RAF Regiment
- No. 4067 Anti-Aircraft Flight RAF Regiment
- No. 4260 Anti-Aircraft Flight RAF Regiment

=== Postwar ===
Towards the end of the war, the Central Fighter Establishment arrived from RAF Wittering on 27 February 1945 with the station being renamed as CFE Tangmere. The RAF High Speed Flight was re-formed here on 14 June 1946 and in September 1946, a world air speed record of 616 mph (991 km/h) was set by Group Captain Edward "Teddy" Mortlock Donaldson in a Gloster Meteor F.4; after his death in 1992, he was buried in St Andrew's Church. In September 1953, Squadron Leader Neville Duke became holder of the world air speed record when he flew a modified Hawker Hunter prototype at 727.63 mph (1,170 km/h) – the 50th anniversary of this event was commemorated in 2003.

A number of units associated with the CFE also arrived including:

- Day Fighter Leaders School (1945) part of CFE
- Enemy Aircraft Flight RAF (1945) part of CFE
- Fighter Interception Development Squadron RAF (1945) part of CFE
- Night Fighter Development Wing RAF (1945) part of CFE
- Night Fighter Training Squadron RAF (1945) part of CFE
- 787 Naval Air Squadron, Fleet Air Arm (1945) connection to CFE

The unit moved to RAF West Raynham on 1 October 1945, while No. 85 Squadron RAF arrived on 11 October 1945 with the de Havilland Mosquito XXX. It upgraded to the Mosquito NF.36 from January 1946. The unit deployed to RAF Lubeck and RAF Acklington for varying periods of time, until finally leaving Tangmere on 16 April 1947, for RAF West Malling. No. 1 Squadron RAF returned on 30 April 1946 from their previous base of RAF Hutton Cranswick with the Supermarine Spitfire F.21; the unit deployed to Acklington and Lubeck at various times. From October 1946 the Gloster Meteor F.3 was introduced but was replaced by the Harvard T.2b and Oxford T.2 from August 1947, in preparation for conversion to the Meteor F.4 which arrived during June 1948. This was replaced by the F.8 during August 1950 and this in turn was replaced by the Hawker Hunter F.5 in September 1958. The squadron was disbanded on 1 July 1958. No. 222 (Natal) Squadron RAF arrived on 2 October 1946 from RAF Weston Zoyland. They were already operating the Meteor F.3 and converted to the newer F.4 during the first few months of 1948, before moving to RAF Lubeck on 1 May 1948.

On 1 June 1950, a Gloster Meteor flying eastwards over Portsmouth reported a UFO at 20,000 ft. It was also seen by the radar at RAF Wartling, and was described as Britain's first flying saucer, and led to the Flying Saucer Working Party later that year.

No. 266 (Rhodesia) Squadron RAF arrived on 16 April 1947 from RAF Wattisham with the Meteor F.3, replacing No. 85 Squadron RAF. No. 266 Squadron upgraded to the Meteor F.4 from February 1948, with the squadron deploying to Lubeck and Acklington during its stay. 266 was disbanded on 11 February 1949 and renumbered as No. 43 Squadron RAF The Meteor F.8 was introduced from September 1950 and the squadron moved to RAF Leuchars on 11 November 1950. On 25 November 1950 No. 29 Squadron RAF arrived from RAF West Malling with the Mosquito NF.30, converting to the Meteor NF.11 from July 1951. The squadron moved to RAF Acklington on 14 January 1957 where it eventually re-equipped with the Gloster Javelin FAW.6. On 1 August 1954 No. 34 Squadron RAF was re-formed here with the Meteor F.8, upgrading to the Hunter F.5 from October 1955 before being disbanded on 15 January 1958. On 30 September 1957 No. 25 Squadron RAF arrived from RAF West Malling, flying the Meteor NF.12 & NF.14 until 1 July 1958 when the squadron was disbanded.

No. 164 (Argentine–British) Squadron RAF arrived from RAF Turnhouse on 25 March 1946 with the Spitfire IX, staying until 26 April 1946 when the squadron moved to RAF Middle Wallop. No. 587 Squadron RAF arrived from RAF Weston Zoyland on 1 June 1946 with the Spitfire XVI, for two weeks before being disbanded. No. 69 Squadron RAF arrived on 19 April 1947 from RAF Wahn during a break from West Germany. It used the Mosquito B.16 until 16 May 1947 when it moved back to Wahn. On 1 July 1950 No. 74 (Trinidad) Squadron RAF, with its Meteor F.4s, arrived from RAF Horsham St Faith, on deployment for 8 days.

In the late 1950s flying was reduced to ground radar calibration under RAF Signals Command, upon the arrival of No. 115 Squadron RAF on 25 August 1958 from RAF Watton, with the Varsity T.1. The Valetta C.1 was introduced from August 1963 but the squadron moved back to Watton on 1 October 1963. No. 245 Squadron RAF arrived on 25 August 1958 from Watton. The squadron was equipped with the Canberra B.2 but was disbanded on 19 April 1963, to become No. 98 Squadron. No. 98 Squadron RAF used the Canberra B.2 until 1 October 1963 when it moved to RAF Watton. Between January and March 1958 a detachment of No. 208 Squadron RAF operated here, training crews on the new Hunter F.6.

The Joint Services Language School moved here and in 1960 the station was granted the "freedom of the City of Chichester", the event being marked by a march through the town and service in the Cathedral.

No. 38 Group Tactical Communications Wing RAF and 244 Signal Squadron (Air Support) were the last units to leave the base, relocating to RAF Benson.

Some of the last flying units to be based at the station included:

- 'B' Flt, No. 22 Squadron RAF (June 1961 - May 1964)
- 22 Squadron - detachment sometime between 1956-74
- 720 Naval Air Squadron, Fleet Air Arm (1947)
- 771 Naval Air Squadron detachment, Fleet Air Arm (1948-49)
- 778 Naval Air Squadron, Fleet Air Arm (1947-48)
- 801 Naval Air Squadron, Fleet Air Arm (1947)

Units:

- No. 38 Group Support Unit (December 1964 - December 1970)
- No. 49 Maintenance Unit RAF detachment (November 1946)
- No. 161 Gliding School RAF (1945 & 47-53)
- No. 623 Gliding School RAF (1963-74)
- No. 8 Fighter Command Servicing Unit (September to October 1945)
- No. 9 Fighter Command Servicing Unit (February 1945 to April 1946)
- Fighter Command Instrument Training Flight RAF (1948-50)
- Towed Target Flight, Tangmere RAF (1950-51)

In 1963–64 the last flying units left. However the station continued to be used for several years and, in 1968, Prince Charles took his first flying lesson at Tangmere. The station finally closed on 16 October 1970; a single Spitfire flew over the airfield as the RAF ensign was lowered for the last time.

== Present use ==
Following the closure of the RAF station, some of the land around the runways was returned to farming. Tangmere Airfield Nurseries have built large glasshouses for the cultivation of peppers and aubergines.

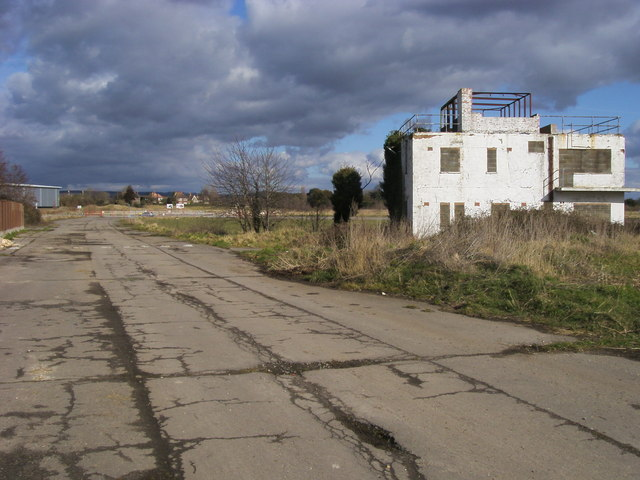
RAF Tangmere Control Tower in 2009

Until 1983, 37 acres (150,000 m^{2}) of barracks, admin blocks and repair workshops remained derelict until bought by Seawards Properties Ltd. Housing soon spread around the airfield, and most RAF buildings were demolished. Officers' quarters have been retained as homes and two original RAF buildings remain, the Grade II listed Control Tower, and one of the 'H Block' accommodation buildings.

The majority of the airfield is now farmed, and since 1979 the runways have slowly been removed thus returning the whole airfield back to large scale farming once again. In 2016 the final piece of apron and the three T.2 hangars were removed, with houses built in their place on a street called Hangar Drive.

The derelict control tower forms part of the farm but is now bricked up and partly overgrown. It became a Grade II listed building in 2011 and was placed on the Heritage at Risk Register in 2015. A campaign is currently underway to restore the control tower which has received local and national press coverage. This is being led by Tangmere Tower Community Interest Company, who restaged 'The Eisenhower Dinner' at the Chichester Harbour Hotel in 2019 to mark the 75th anniversary of General Eisenhower's original meal in 1944. The CIC are working with the local Aviation Museum, the University of Chichester and Sussex Police and with their architect have submitted a planning application for phase one of the project.

=== Tangmere Military Aviation Museum ===
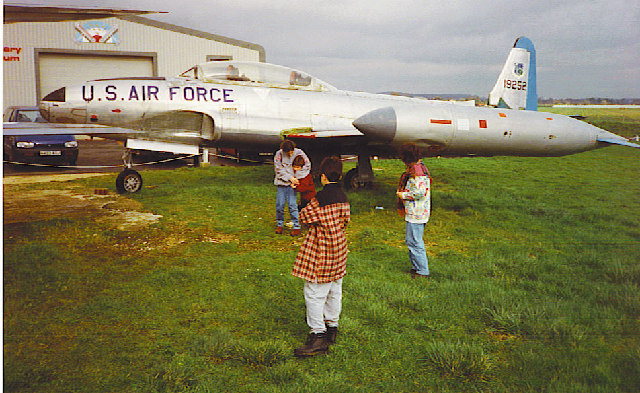
Tangmere Air Museum, February 1995

Tangmere Military Aviation Museum was founded by a group of enthusiastic veterans. It has a replica Supermarine Spitfire and Hawker Hurricane as well as many original aircraft, including Neville Duke's speed record Hawker Hunter. On display is the Gloster Meteor flown by Teddy Donaldson when he set the world air speed record in September 1946, breaking the 1,000 km/h barrier.

== 34067 locomotive ==
A number of Oliver Bulleid's light pacific locomotives were named after Battle of Britain squadrons, stations, or commanders. One such locomotive that is preserved and still in main line operation is named "Tangmere" (no 34067).

== See also ==
- List of Battle of Britain airfields
- List of Battle of Britain squadrons
