= Neville Duke =

RAF fighter ace (1922-2007)

Neville Frederick Duke
- Cover from Test Pilot, Neville Duke's autobiography
- Born: 11 January 1922; Tonbridge, Kent
- Died: 7 April 2007 (aged 85); St Peter's Hospital, Chertsey
- Military career
- Allegiance: United Kingdom
- Branch: Royal Air Force
- Service years: 1939–1964
- Rank: Squadron Leader
- Units: No. 92 Squadron RAF; No. 112 Squadron RAF; No. 37 Squadron RAF
- Commands: No. 615 Squadron RAF; No. 145 Squadron RAF
- Conflicts: Second World War
- Awards: Distinguished Service Order; Officer of the Order of the British Empire; Distinguished Flying Cross & Two Bars; Air Force Cross; Queen's Commendation for Valuable Service in the Air; War Cross (Czechoslovakia)
- Other work: Test pilot

Neville Frederick Duke, DSO, OBE, DFC & Two Bars, AFC, FRAeS (11 January 1922 – 7 April 2007) was a British test pilot and fighter ace of the Second World War. He was credited with the destruction of 27 enemy aircraft. After the war, Duke was acknowledged as one of the world's foremost test pilots. In 1953, he became holder of the world air speed record when he flew a Hawker Hunter at 727.63 mph (1,171.01 km/h) over Littlehampton.

== Early life ==
Duke was born in Tonbridge, Kent, and educated at the Convent of St Mary and The Judd School in Tonbridge. One of the four houses at Judd was named after him, following the reinstating of a house system to the school in 2008, until the changing of the House system in 2017, with the New Headmaster Jon Wood.

Duke started working as an auctioneer and estate agent before attempting to join the Fleet Air Arm on his 18th birthday. He was rejected but in June 1940 he joined the RAF as a cadet.

== Second World War ==
=== Initial combat ===
Duke underwent pilot training and was commissioned at No. 58 Operational Training Unit, Grangemouth in February 1941, before being posted to No. 92 Squadron at Biggin Hill in April, flying Supermarine Spitfire Mk Vs. Operating over occupied Europe, Duke's obvious talents as a fighter pilot meant he often flew as wingman to Biggin Hill's wing leader, Wing Commander Adolph "Sailor" Malan. By August 1941, Duke had claimed two Messerschmitt Bf 109s shot down. When the unit was withdrawn for a rest in October 1941, Duke was posted to North Africa to fly with No. 112 Squadron on the Curtiss Tomahawk.

=== Desert operations ===
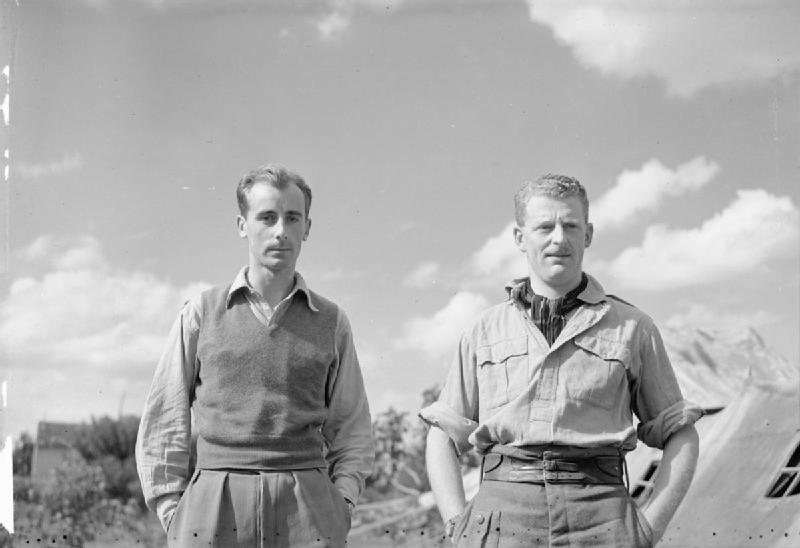
Duke (left) during WWII

Duke found flying the P-40 less agreeable than the Spitfire, and on a familiarisation flight crashed AM390.

On 30 November 1941, Duke was shot down by the high scoring German ace Oberfeldwebel Otto Schulz from Jagdgeschwader 27. On 5 December, he was again shot down by a pilot from JG 27 and wounded by splinters in the leg. He managed to crash-land near Tobruk and was sent back to Cairo in a Blenheim for a rest. However, his own tally of victories continued to mount and, after the squadron was re-equipped with the more capable Curtiss Kittyhawk, by February 1942, Duke had at least eight victories, resulting in the award of the Distinguished Flying Cross (DFC) in March. These victories included a Fiat CR.42 and a Bf 109 on 20 and 21 December. He completed his first tour of operations the next month and then spent six months instructing at the fighter school in the Canal Zone.

In November 1942, Duke rejoined 92 Squadron, which has been transferred to North Africa flying the tropicalised Spitfire Mark V. (Note: For an explanation of different Spitfire marks, see Supermarine Spitfire variants) He became a flight commander in February 1943 and received a Distinguished Service Order in March. By the end of his second tour in June, Duke had amassed a further 14 victories to his total and was awarded a bar to his DFC.

Promoted to squadron leader, Duke was posted to No. 73 Operational Training Unit at Abu Sueir as chief flying instructor before returning to operations in March 1944 for his third tour, as commanding officer of No. 145 Squadron in Italy, flying Spitfire Mk VIIIs. He claimed five more aircraft shot down in May, gaining a second bar to his DFC. On 7 June, Duke was shot down by flak and baled out into Lake Bracciano, almost drowning when unable to release his parachute harness. He sheltered with Italian partisans until U.S. troops arrived.

Downing two Fw 190s of Schlachtgeschwader 4 in May, Duke scored his final kills on 7 September 1944, becoming the Mediterranean Theatre's top Allied fighter ace at the age of 22. In 486 sorties and some 712 operational hours, he claimed 27 outright victories and two shared, one probable, six damaged and two shared destroyed on the ground.

== Test pilot ==
Duke returned to the UK and took up a position as test pilot for Hawker in January 1945. He attended No 4 Course at the Empire Test Pilots' School at Cranfield in 1946 and then joined the RAF's High Speed Flight unit, commanded by Teddy Donaldson. It was Donaldson who set a new official world air speed record on 7 September 1946, later being the first official man to break the 1,000 km/h barrier. After demonstrating a Gloster Meteor at an air display in Prague, he was presented with the Czech War Cross for his wartime service.

Duke was awarded the Air Force Cross recognising his test flying from 1947 to 1948 at the Aeroplane and Armament Experimental Establishment at Boscombe Down, where he flew research flights to explore aircraft performance at high Mach numbers and high altitudes. Duke resigned from the RAF in August 1948, joining the Royal Auxiliary Air Force, flying Spitfires and Meteors from Biggin Hill. He was CO of No. 615 Squadron in 1950 and 1951, whose honorary air commodore was Winston Churchill.

Duke joined Hawker as an assistant chief test pilot in 1948, and became Hawker's chief test pilot in 1951, following the death of "Wimpy" Wade, his predecessor. He was particularly involved in the development of the highly successful Hawker Hunter, flying the Hawker P1067 in its trials in July 1951. He gave a display in the new fighter at the Farnborough Airshow on 6 September 1952, shortly after a prototype de Havilland DH 110, piloted by his friend John Derry, had broken up in flight, killing Derry and his observer Tony Richards, along with 28 spectators. "My dear Duke", the Prime Minister wrote to him the next day, "it was characteristic of you to go up yesterday after the shocking accident. Accept my salute. Yours, in grief, Winston Churchill."

Duke was appointed an Officer of the Order of the British Empire in January 1953 for his contribution to supersonic flight and ground breaking achievements at Hawker. On 7 September 1953, Duke set a new world air speed record of 727.63 mph (1,171.01 km/h), flying Hunter WB188. (With this world record Neville Duke exceeded the unofficial world record set by Heini Dittmar with the Me 163 BV18), also gaining for himself the Gold Medal of the Royal Aero Club. He was awarded the Queen's Commendation for Valuable Service in the Air for saving his aircraft after an engine failure in August 1955. Two days later, Duke fractured his spine following a forced landing in a Hunter at Thorney Island. Another heavy landing in May 1956 caused further spinal injuries; he was forced to resign in October 1956 after being immobilised for several months.

== Later life ==
Duke married Gwendoline Fellows in 1947.

Duke took up freelance aviation consultancy work until 1960, when he formed Duke Aviation Limited. He was Sir George Dowty's personal pilot for most of the 1960s and 1970s. He sold the company in 1982. He also became a test pilot for Edgley Aircraft and later Brooklands Aircraft on the Edgley Optica and Brooklands Firemaster 65.

Duke wrote several books based on his experiences. His autobiography, Test Pilot, was published in 1953 and reprinted in 1992. His other books include The Sound Barrier (1953), The Crowded Sky (1959) and The War Diaries of Neville Duke (1995). He was awarded the Royal Aero Club's gold medal and was elected a Fellow of the Royal Aeronautical Society in 1993. In 2002, he received the Air League's Jeffrey Quill Medal and the Award of Honour from the Guild of Air Pilots and Navigators for "his unique and incomparable record".

Duke became one of the vice presidents of the Eagle Club, formed by the Eagle magazine, in 1950, and many schoolboys from that era came to know of Duke through this association. It is speculated that "Dan Dare, Pilot of the Future" may have been inspired by Duke's achievements.

Duke was honorary president of Tangmere Military Aviation Museum, where his record-breaking Hunter is displayed.

After three burglaries, Duke sold his war medals in 2006 when the costs of insuring them became prohibitive. He denied press reports that he needed the money to pay for a hip operation for his wife Gwen. On 7 April 2007, the couple were flying their private aircraft when Duke became ill. He landed safely at Popham Airfield, but collapsed as he left the aircraft. He was taken by ambulance to hospital in Basingstoke where he was diagnosed as suffering from an aneurysm. He was transferred to St Peter's Hospital, Chertsey, Surrey, and died later that same evening after an operation, at the age of 85.
