= 1956 Hawker Hunter multiple aircraft accident =

Aviation accident in England

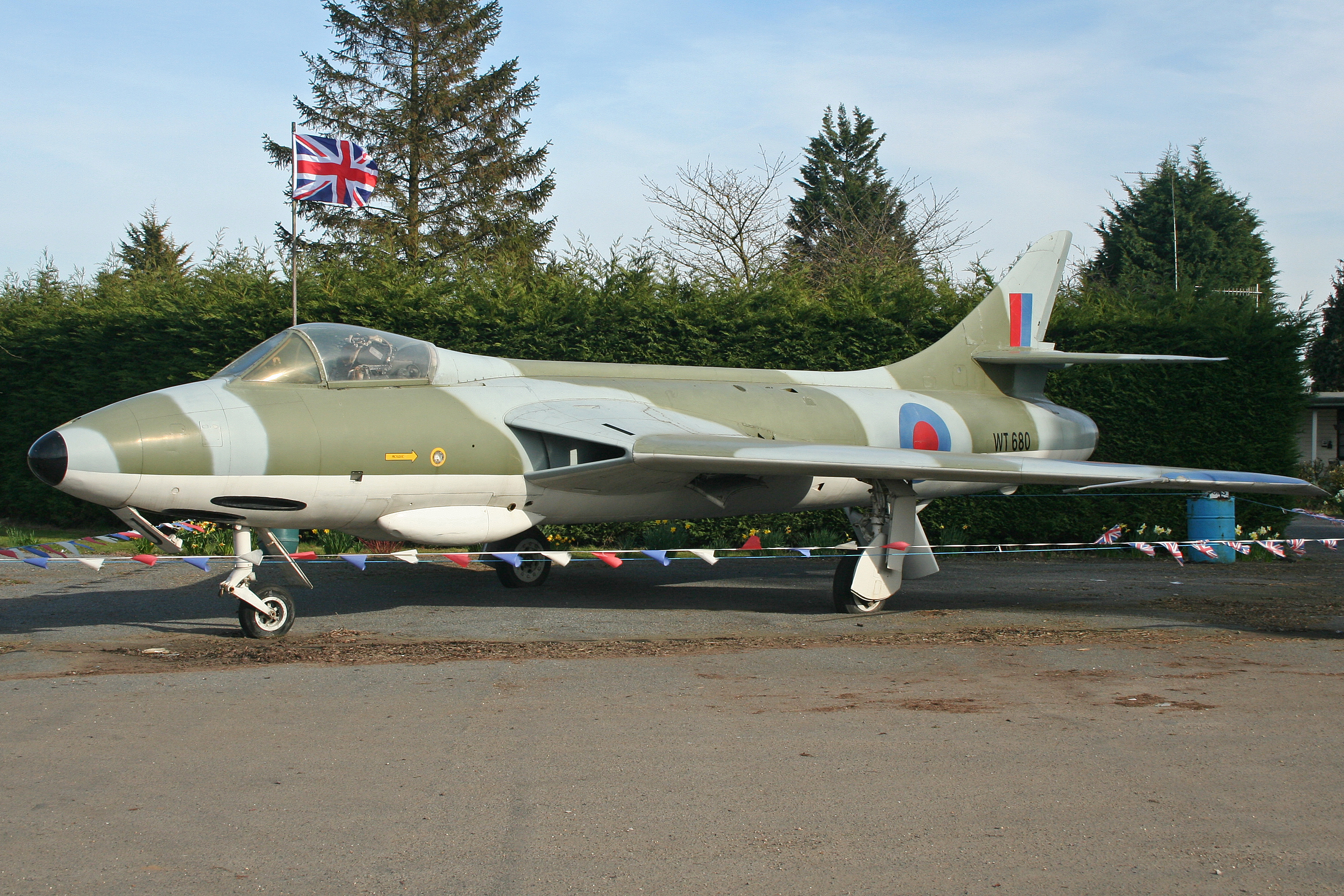
- A Hawker Hunter F1, of the type involved in the incident (seen here in preservation in 2012)

Accident
- Date: 8 February 1956
- Aircraft type: Hawker Hunter F1
- Operator: Royal Air Force
- Registration: WW635; WT692; WT629; WT639; WW633; WW603
- Flight origin: RAF West Raynham
- Destination: RAF Marham
- Fatalities: 1
- Survivors: 5

On 8 February 1956 the Royal Air Force lost six Hawker Hunter jet fighters in a multiple aircraft accident. Eight aircraft from RAF West Raynham had been carrying out a 4x4 dogfight exercise at 45,000 feet (14,000 m). Upon completion of the exercise, the eight Hunters diverted to RAF Marham, but due to bad weather, six of the aircraft were lost, including one fatality.

== Accident ==
The eight Hunter F1s from the Day Fighter Leader Squadron of the Central Fighter Establishment departed RAF West Raynham, Norfolk, England at 10:50 to carry out the exercise at 45,000 feet (14,000 m) in the local area. Due to the expected bad weather later in the day the aircraft were scheduled to return to West Raynham overhead by 11:15. By 11:00 the weather at West Raynham had deteriorated with poor visibility and the aircraft were told to divert to nearby RAF Marham for a visual approach.

The visibility suddenly reduced but due to the close proximity of the aircraft to each other it was not possible to complete ground controlled approaches. In the following confusion and with only 10 minutes of fuel remaining, only two aircraft landed successfully.

WT629
Descended to 600 ft (180 m), but, unable to see the ground, he climbed away to 4,000 ft (1,200 m) and ejected with the aircraft crashing into a field two miles (3 km) northwest of Swaffham.
WT639
Descended to 600 ft (180 m), but, unable to see the ground, he climbed away. The pilot ejected when the engine flamed out. The aircraft crashed into a forest two and a half miles (4 km) southwest of Swaffham.
WW633
Descended to 500 ft (150 m), but, unable to see the ground, he climbed away. The pilot ejected when the engine flamed out. The aircraft crashed into a field three and a half miles (6 km) northwest of Swaffham.
WW639
Descended to 250 ft (76 m), but, unable to see the ground, he climbed away. The pilot ejected when fuel was exhausted. The aircraft crashed three miles (5 km) south of Swaffham.
WW635
Crashed four and a half miles (7 km) northwest of Swaffham, pilot killed.
WW603
Belly-landed following engine flame-out just east of the airfield, pilot unhurt.

== Aftermath ==
Questions were asked in Parliament about the loss of six aircraft worth about £750,000 and the suspicion—expressed by the Labour MP George Wigg—that "Marks I and II are liable to be deficient in fuel if a crisis arises". Concern was also raised about the carrying out of the exercise in the expected weather conditions.

== Investigation ==
The Board of Inquiry (BoI) reported that the primary cause of the accident was the sudden deterioration in the weather. The board also said it was an error of judgement to divert the aircraft to Marham on the assumption that they could do a visual landing.

The BoI stated that the decision to fly in the weather conditions was proper and reasonable, the pilots were all competent, the aircraft were serviceable and had adequate fuel and endurance for the planned mission.

The Air Officer Commanding-in-Chief Fighter Command decided that disciplinary action should be taken against officers in charge of flying operations at West Raynham. One officer was reproved and removed from his job and three other officers were reproved.
