= Hawker Hunter =

1950s family of British fighter aircraft

Hunter
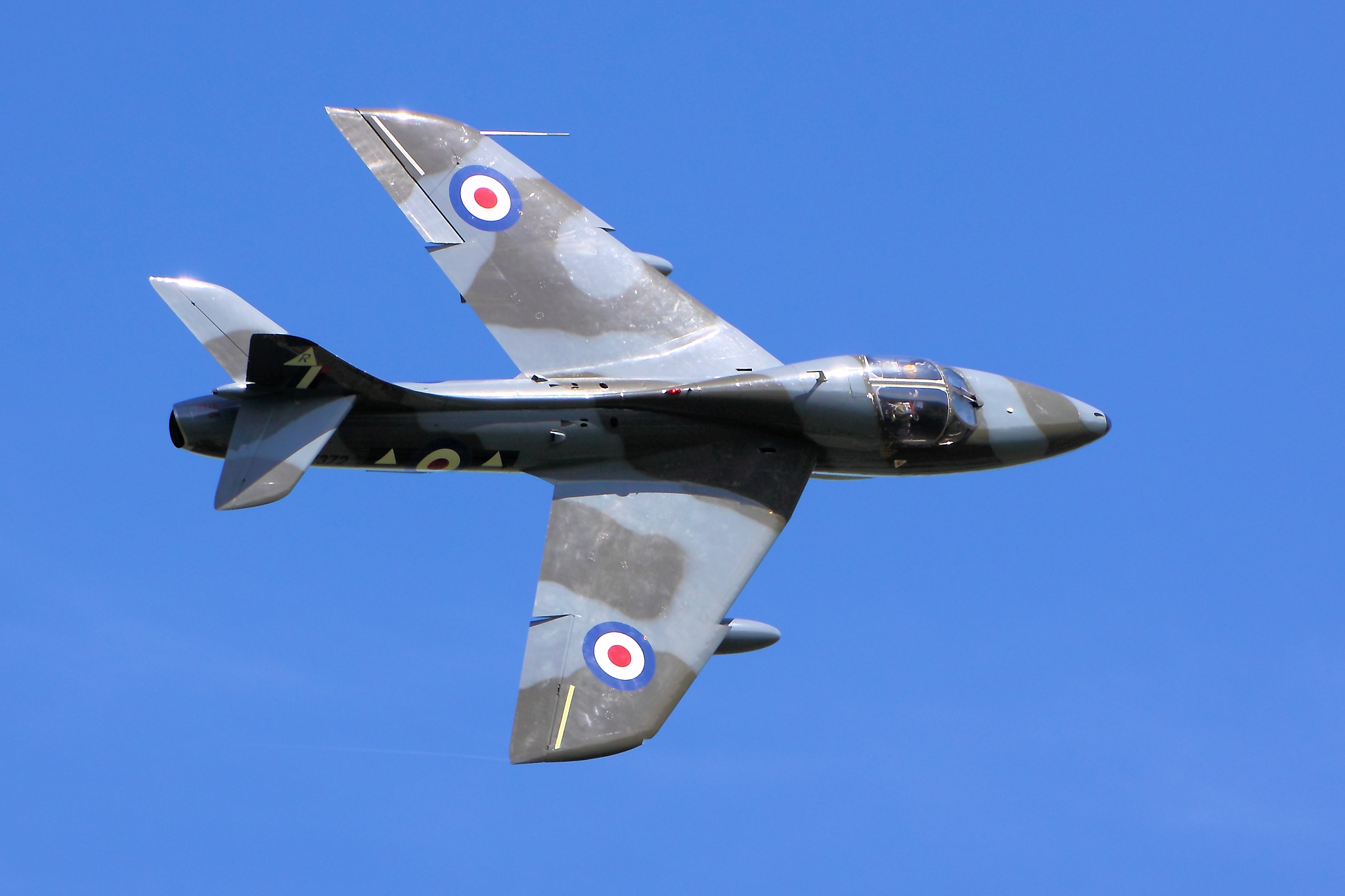
- Two-seat Hunter T.7 at Shuttleworth Military airshow 2013

General information
- Type: Fighter; Fighter-bomber/Ground attack Reconnaissance aircraft
- National origin: United Kingdom
- Manufacturer: Hawker Siddeley
- Status: Active as a warbird and contractor aggressor aircraft
- Primary users: Royal Air Force Indian Air Force; Swedish Air Force; Swiss Air Force
- Number built: 1,972

History
- Introduction date: 1954
- First flight: 20 July 1951

The Hawker Hunter is a transonic British jet-powered fighter aircraft that was developed by Hawker Aircraft for the Royal Air Force (RAF) during the late 1940s and early 1950s. It was designed to take advantage of the newly developed Rolls-Royce Avon turbojet engine and the swept wing, and was the first jet-powered aircraft produced by Hawker to be procured by the RAF. On 7 September 1953, the modified first prototype broke the world air speed record for aircraft, achieving a speed of 727.63 mph (1,171.01 km/h; 632.29 kn).

The single-seat Hunter was introduced to service in 1954 as a manoeuvrable day interceptor aircraft, quickly succeeding first-generation jet fighters in RAF service such as the Gloster Meteor and the de Havilland Venom. The all-weather/night fighter role was filled by the Gloster Javelin. Successively improved variants of the type were produced, adopting increasingly more capable engine models and expanding its fuel capacity among other modifications being implemented. Hunters were also used by two RAF display teams: the Black Arrows, who on one occasion looped a record-breaking 22 Hunters in formation, and later the Blue Diamonds, who flew 16 aircraft. The Hunter was also widely exported, serving with a total of 21 overseas air forces.

During the 1960s, following the introduction of the supersonic English Electric Lightning in the interceptor role, the Hunter transitioned to being operated as a fighter-bomber and for aerial reconnaissance missions, using dedicated variants for these purposes. Two-seat variants remained in use for training and secondary roles with the RAF and the Royal Navy until the early 1990s. Sixty years after its original introduction it was still in active service, being operated by the Lebanese Air Force until 2014.

The Hunter saw combat service in a range of conflicts with several operators, including the Suez Crisis, the Aden Emergency, the Sino-Indian War, the Indo-Pakistani War of 1965, the Indo-Pakistani War of 1971, the Rhodesian Bush War, the Second Congo War, the Six-Day War, the War of Attrition and the Yom Kippur War. Overall, 1,972 Hunters were manufactured by Hawker Aircraft and its successor, Hawker Siddeley, as well as being produced under licence overseas. In British service, the Hunter was replaced in its principal roles by the Lightning, the Hawker Siddeley Harrier and the McDonnell Douglas F-4 Phantom II.

== Development ==
=== Background ===
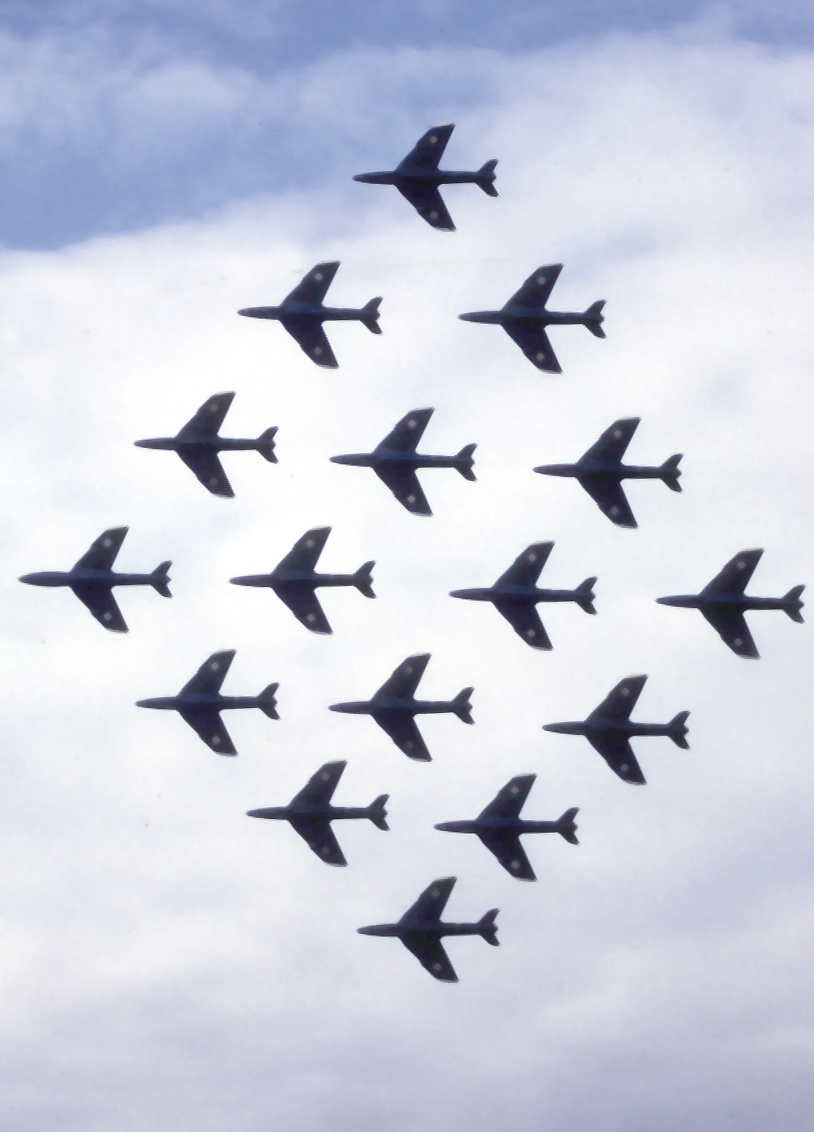
RAF Hunters of the Black Arrows performing aerobatics at Farnborough Airshow, 1960

In late 1945, as the Second World War came to a close, the Attlee government came to power in Britain. The new government's initial stance on defence was that no major conflict would occur for at least a decade, and thus there would be no need to procure any new aircraft until 1957. In accordance with this policy, aside from a small number of exceptions, the majority of Specifications issued by the Air Ministry for fighter-sized aircraft during the late 1940s were restricted to research purposes. Aviation author Derek Wood describes this policy as being: "a fatal error of judgement which was to cost Britain a complete generation of fighters and heavy bomber aircraft".

Despite the official halt in procurement, the RAF came to recognise that it would urgently require the development and procurement of fighters equipped with features such as swept wings. By this time, it had also become apparent that newly developed jet propulsion would form the future of fighter aircraft development. Many companies were quick to devise their own designs to harness this means of propulsion. Hawker Aviation's chief designer, Sydney Camm, had proposed the Hawker P.1040 for the RAF, but the demonstrator failed to interest them. Further modifications to the basic design resulted in the Hawker Sea Hawk carrier-based fighter for the Royal Navy. However, the Sea Hawk possessed a straight wing and was powered by the Rolls-Royce Nene turbojet engine, both features that rapidly became obsolete.

An "experimental aircraft for investigation into the controllability and stability of swept wings at low speeds" was the subject of Air Ministry issued Specification E.38/46. Sydney Camm designed the Hawker P.1052, which was essentially a Sea Hawk outfitted with a 35-degree swept wing. Performing its first flight in 1948, the P.1052 demonstrated good performance and conducted several carrier trials, but was ultimately determined to not warrant further development into a production aircraft. Following interest from the Australian government – which was seeking an all-round jet fighter to replace Mustangs operated by the RAAF – Hawker reworked the second P.1052 prototype into the Hawker P.1081. This had swept tailplanes, a revised fuselage, and a single jet exhaust at the rear. On 19 June 1950, the P.1081 conducted its maiden flight. However, as the needs of the RAAF, in the Korean War, had become more urgent, Australia instead ordered a mature design, the Gloster Meteor. Further development of the P.1081 was stalled by difficulties with the engine's reheat. In 1951, the sole P.1081 prototype was lost in a crash.

=== P.1067 ===
A day interceptor powered by a single axial compressor jet engine – either the Rolls Royce AJ.65 (later known as the Avon), or the Metrovick F.9 (later known as the Armstrong Siddeley Sapphire) – was the subject of Air Ministry Specification F.43/46, in 1946. The interceptor was to be capable of mounting a radical weapon that would remain purely hypothetical: a 4.5 inch (114 mm) recoilless cannon. In response, Camm designed a swept-wing aircraft powered by a RR Avon. The major advantages of axial compressor jets were greater thrust and a much smaller engine diameter; the Avon engine output roughly the same power as two Rolls-Royce Derwents (the powerplant of the Gloster Meteor, which was to be replaced by the fighter proposed under F.43/46).

In March 1948, the Air Ministry replaced Specification F.43/46 with Specification F.3/48, which demanded a speed of 629 mph (1,010 km/h) at 45,000 ft (13,700 m) and a high rate of climb, while carrying an armament of four 20 mm (0.79 in) or two 30 mm (1.18 in) cannon (rather than the large-calibre gun demanded by the earlier specification). As the Hawker P.1067, Camm's 1946 design was adopted for the new Specification. Initially fitted with a single air intake in the nose and a T-tail, the project rapidly evolved into the more familiar Hunter shape. The intakes were moved to the wing roots to make room for weapons and radar in the nose, and a more conventional tail arrangement was devised as a result of stability concerns.

While the RAF itself had little direct involvement in the Korean War, it underlined the need for new interceptors. This was felt to be so pressing that the RAF was willing to consider accepting interim fighter aircraft, while more capable fighters would continue to be pursued. In particular, the RAF felt that a pair of proposed fighter aircraft from Hawker Aircraft and Supermarine were of high importance and thus placed orders for these proposed fighters 'off the drawing board' in 1950. The reasoning behind these two aircraft being ordered in 1950 was intended to serve as an insurance policy in the event of either one of these projects failing to produce a viable aircraft; these two aircraft would later become known as the Supermarine Swift and the Hawker Hunter respectively.

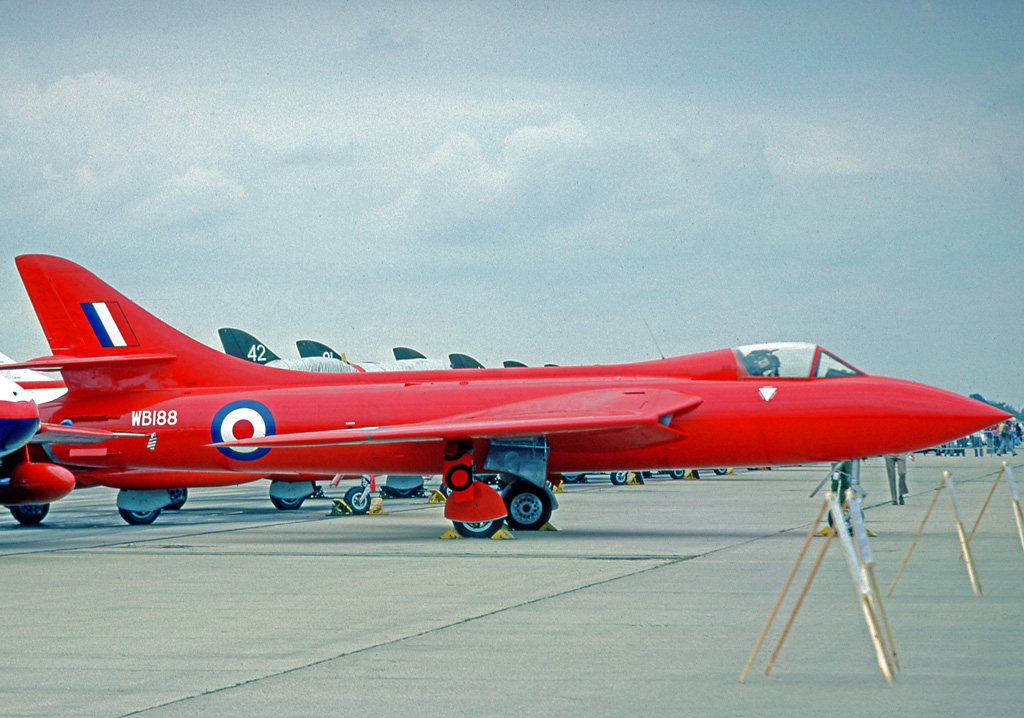
The prototype Hunter WB188, modified to Mark 3 standard, displayed in its world speed record colours in 1976.

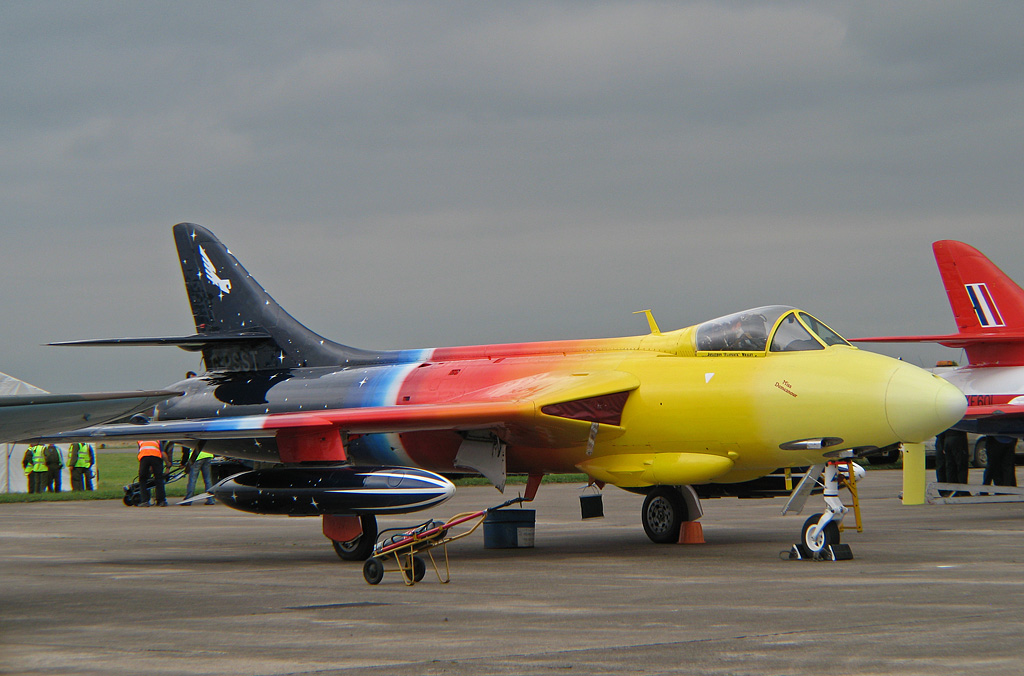
"Miss Demeanour" – a privately owned Hawker Hunter F.58A, 2007.

On 20 July 1951, the P.1067 made its maiden flight, flown by Neville Duke, from RAF Boscombe Down, powered by a single 6,500 lbf (28.91 kN) Avon 103 engine. The second prototype, which was fitted with production-standard avionics, armament and a 7,550 lbf (33.6 kN) Avon 107 turbojet, first flew on 5 May 1952. As an insurance against development problems on the part of the Avon engine, Hawker modified the design to accommodate another axial turbojet, the 8,000 lbf (36 kN) Armstrong Siddeley Sapphire 101. Fitted with a Sapphire, the third prototype flew on 30 November 1952.

On 16 March 1953, the first production standard Hunter F.1, fitted with a single 7,600 lbf (34 kN) Avon 113 turbojet, made its first flight. The first 20 aircraft were, in effect, a pre-production series and featured a number of "one-off" modifications such as blown flaps and area ruled fuselage. On 7 September 1953, the sole Hunter Mk 3 (the modified first prototype, WB 188) flown by Neville Duke broke the world air speed record for jet-powered aircraft, attaining a speed of 727.63 mph (1,171.01 km/h) over Littlehampton, West Sussex. This world record stood for less than three weeks before being broken on 25 September 1953 by the Hunter's early rival, the Supermarine Swift, flown by Michael Lithgow.

== Design ==
=== Overview ===
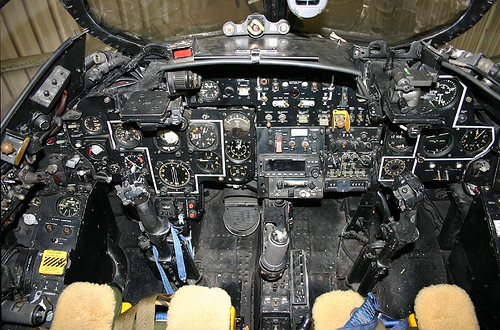
The cockpit of a preserved Hunter

The Hunter entered service with the Royal Air Force as an interceptor aircraft. It was the first jet aircraft produced by Hawker for the RAF. From the outset it was clear that the type had exceptional performance, being the first RAF aircraft capable of effectively matching the English Electric Canberra bomber. The Hunter also set numerous aviation records, including absolute speed records. The type was also lauded for its quick turnaround time, enabled by features such as its removable gun pack and pressurised fuelling system, and for its easy handling in flight.

The definitive version of the Hunter was the FGA.9, on which the majority of export versions were based. Although the Supermarine Swift had initially been politically favoured by the British government, the Hunter proved far more successful, and had a lengthy service life with various operators, in part due to its low maintenance requirements and operating costs, while further development of the Swift programme was cancelled in 1955.

As the RAF received newer aircraft capable of supersonic speeds to perform the air interceptor role, many Hunters were modified and re-equipped for undertaking ground-attack and reconnaissance missions instead. Hunters deemed surplus to the RAF's requirements were also quickly refurbished for continued service abroad. The Hunter would be procured by a considerable number of foreign nations. In addition to former RAF aircraft, roughly half of the nearly 2,000 Hunters produced had been manufactured specifically for overseas customers. The Hunter would be in operational service with the RAF for over 30 years. As late as 1996, hundreds were still in active service with various operators across the world.

=== Armament and equipment ===
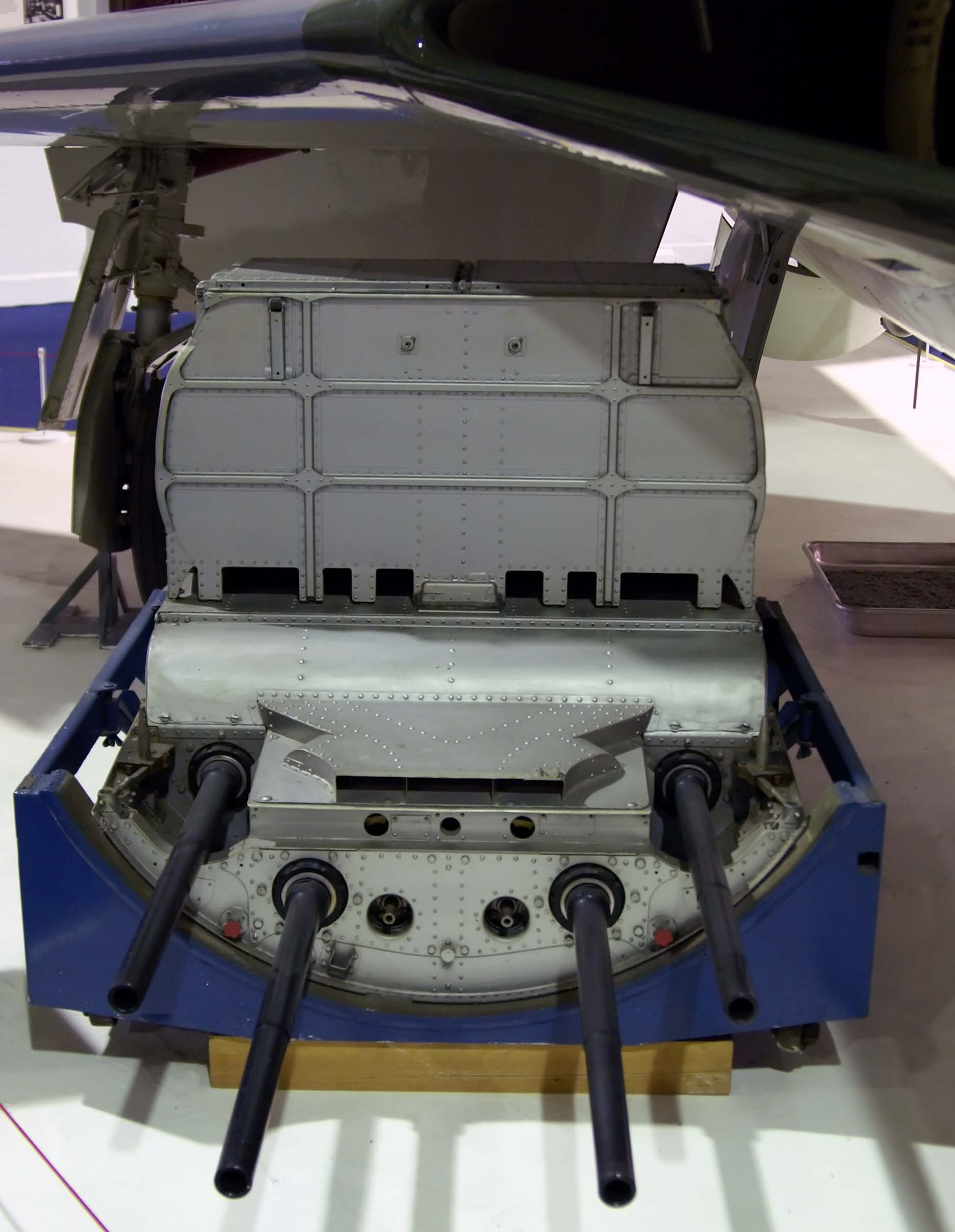
A Hunter's removable weapons pack. In the foreground are the four 30 mm ADEN cannons.

The single-seat fighter versions of the Hunter were armed with four 30 mm (1.18 in) ADEN cannon, with 150 rounds of ammunition per gun. The cannon and ammunition boxes were contained in a single pack that could be removed from the aircraft for rapid re-arming and maintenance. Unusually, the barrels of the cannon remained in the aircraft while the pack was removed and changed. In the two-seat version, either a single 30 mm ADEN cannon was carried or, in some export versions, two, with a removable ammunition tank. Later versions of the Hunter were fitted with SNEB pods; these were 68 mm (2.68 in) rocket projectiles in 18-round Matra pods, providing an effective strike capability against ground targets.

The Hunter featured a nose-mounted ranging radar, providing range input to the gyro gunsight for air-to-air gunnery only. Other equipment included pylon-mounted underwing external fuel tanks, a forward-facing gun camera, and large streamlined pods for collecting expended shell cases beneath the gun pack. These were nicknamed "Sabrinas", after the buxom actress of the time. Several variants were fitted with tail-mounted brake parachutes. Typically, export Hunters were equipped to be compatible with additional types of missiles, such as the AIM-9 Sidewinder air-to-air missile and the AGM-65 Maverick air-to-surface missile.

=== Layout and structure ===
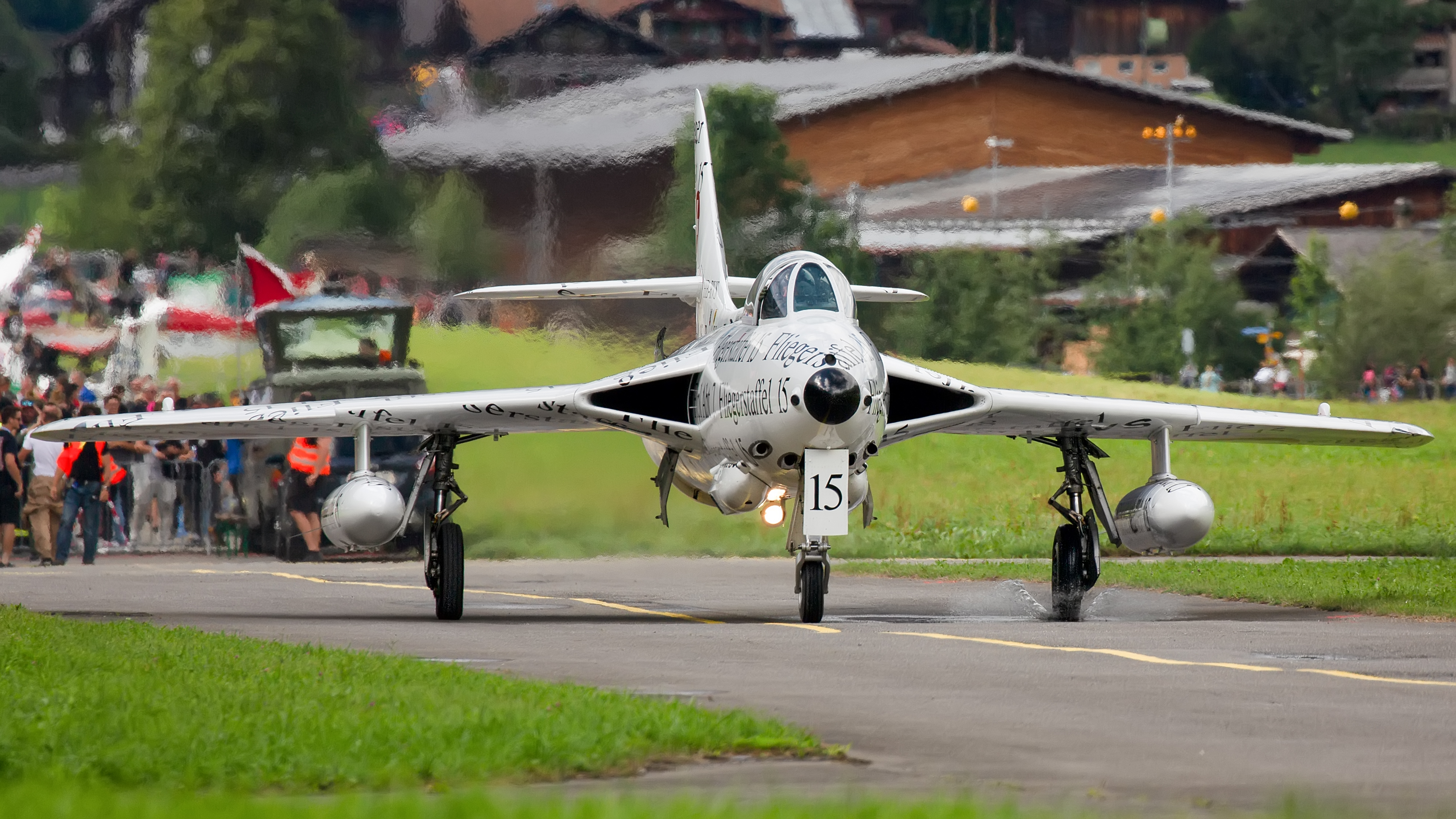
Ex-Swiss Air Force Hunter Mk 58 J-4040 at Hunterfest (St. Stephan, 2022)

The Hunter is a conventional swept wing all-metal monoplane. The fuselage is of monocoque construction, with a removable rear section for engine maintenance. The engine is fed through triangular air intakes in the wing roots and has a single jetpipe in the rear of the fuselage. The mid-mounted wings have a leading edge sweep of 35° and slight anhedral, the tailplanes and fin are also swept. The Hunter's aerodynamic qualities were increasingly infringed upon by modifications in later production models, such as the addition of external containers to collect spent gun cartridges, underwing fuel tanks to increase range, leading edge extensions to resolve pitch control difficulties, and a large ventral air brake.

Late-production F.6s also featured an "all-moving tailplane", in which the entire tailplane pivoted to provide better transonic flight control. The elevator was retained as part of the all-moving tailplane.

The airframe of the Hunter consists of six interchangeable major sections: the forward fuselage (housing the cockpit and armament pack), center fuselage (including the integral wing roots and air duct intakes), rear fuselage, tail unit assembly, and two individually produced wings. Production was divided up so major sections could be completed individually and manufacturing of the type could be dispersed to reduce vulnerability to attack. Establishing initial full-rate production for the type was difficult, as manufacturing the Hunter required the development of 3,250 tool designs and the procurement of 40,000 fixtures, jigs, and tools.

=== Engine ===
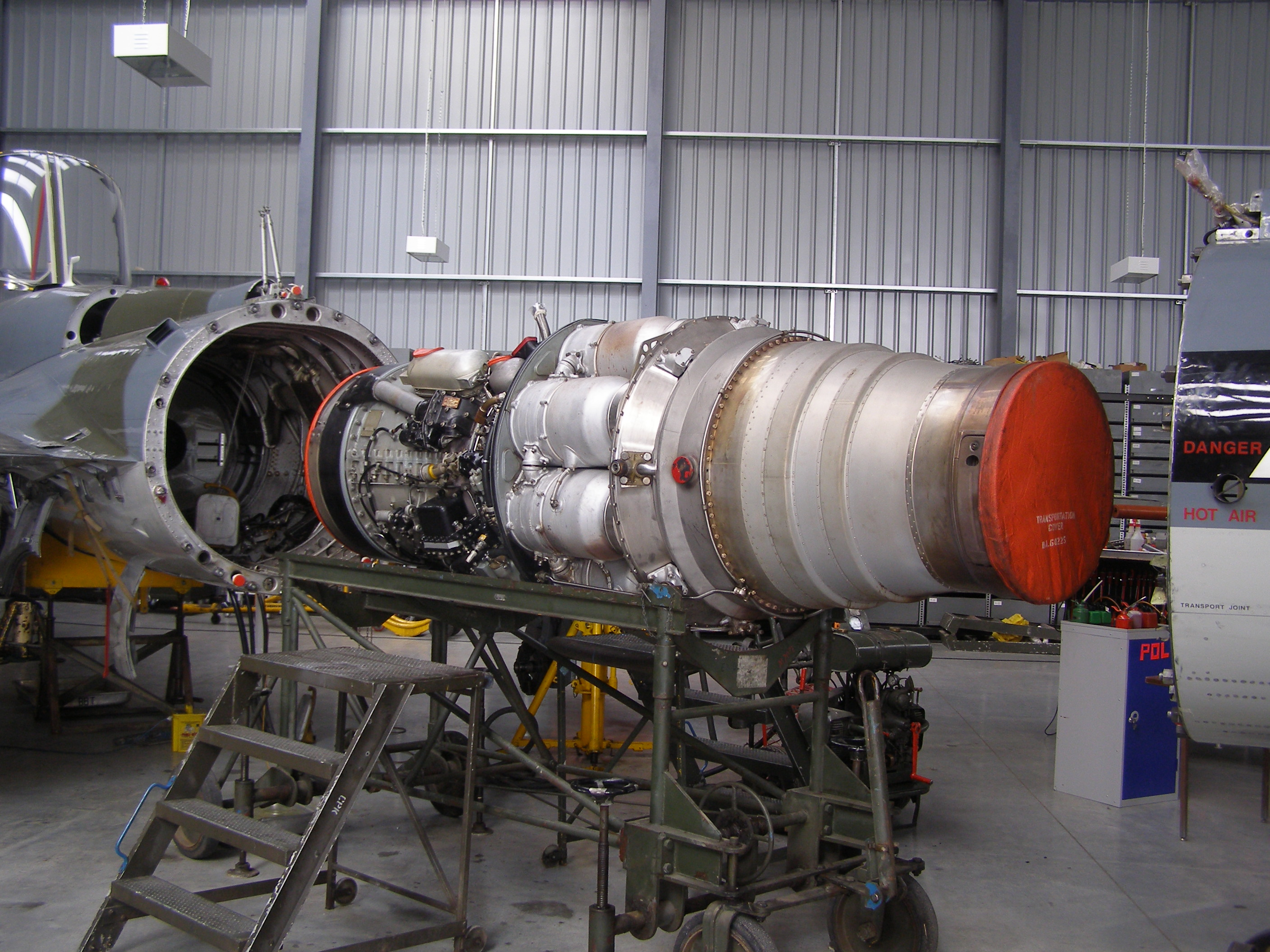
The tail and rear fuselage are detachable, providing maintenance access to the aircraft's single engine

The P.1067 first flew from RAF Boscombe Down in Wiltshire on 20 July 1951, powered by a 6,500 lbf (29 kN) Rolls-Royce Avon 103 engine from an English Electric Canberra bomber. The second prototype was fitted with a 7,550 lbf (33.6 kN) Avon 107 turbojet. Hawker's third prototype was powered by an 8,000 lbf (36 kN) Armstrong Siddeley Sapphire 101. Production Hunters were fitted with either the Avon or the Sapphire engine.

Early on in the Hunter's service the Avon engines proved to have poor surge margins, and worryingly suffered compressor stalls when the cannons were fired, sometimes resulting in flameouts. The practice of "fuel dipping", reducing fuel flow to the engine when the cannon were fired, was a satisfactory solution. Although the Sapphire did not suffer from the flameout problems of the Avon and had better fuel economy, Sapphire-powered Hunters suffered many engine failures. The RAF elected to persevere with the Avon to simplify supply and maintenance, since the Canberra bomber used the same engine.

The RAF sought more thrust than was available from the Avon 100 series; in response Rolls-Royce developed the Avon 200 series engine. This was an almost wholly new design, equipped with a new compressor to put an end to surge problems, an annular combustion chamber, and an improved fuel control system. The resulting Avon 203 produced 10,000 lbf (44 kN) of thrust, and was the engine for the Hunter F.6.

== Operational history ==
=== Royal Air Force ===
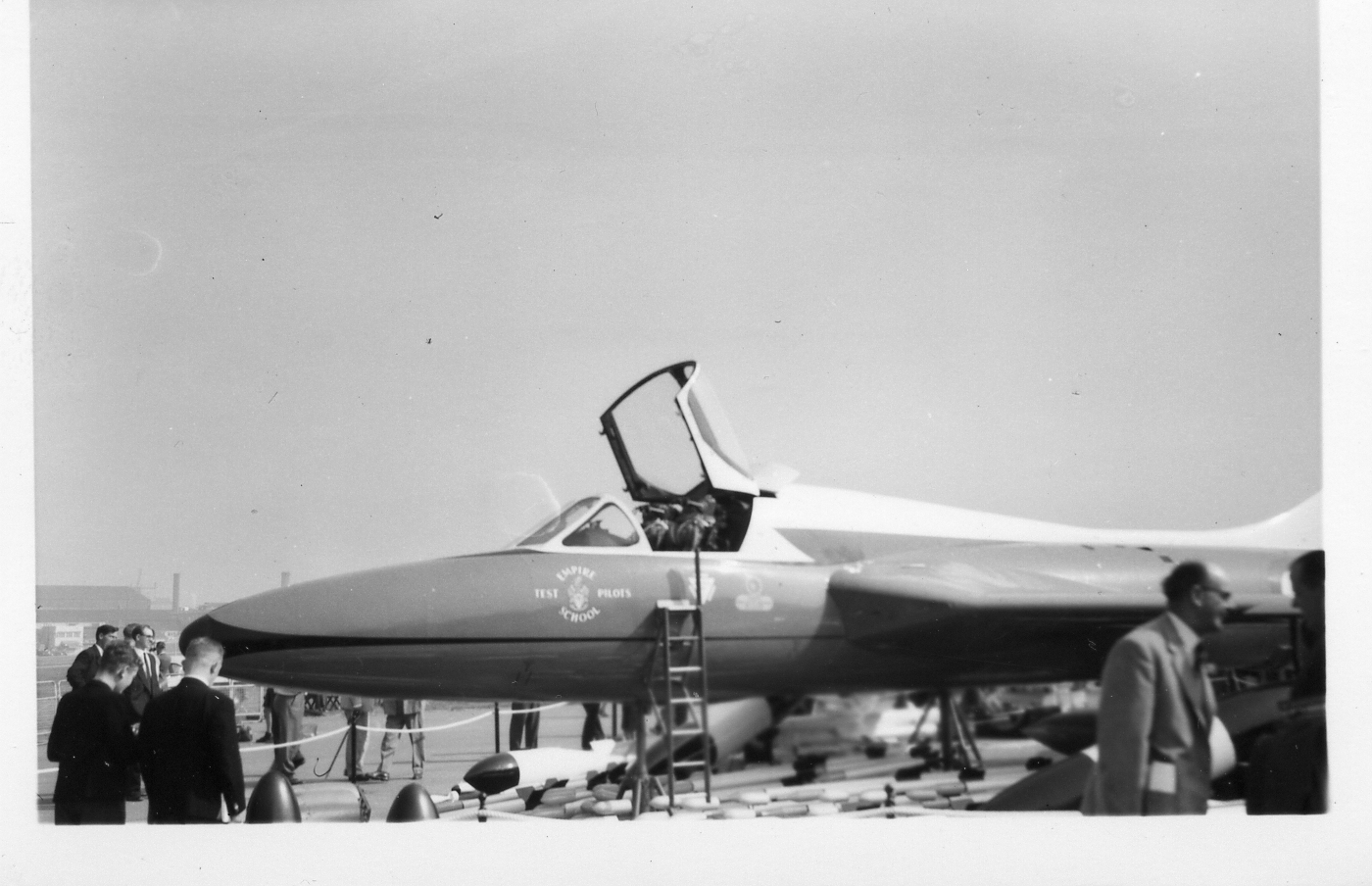
Hunter T.7 of the Empire Test Pilots' School, Farnborough Air Show, September 1959

The Hunter F.1 entered service with the Royal Air Force in July 1954. It was the first high-speed jet aircraft equipped with radar and fully powered flight controls to go into widespread service with the RAF. The Hunter replaced the Gloster Meteor, the Canadair Sabre, and the de Havilland Venom jet fighters in service. Initially, low internal fuel capacity restricted the Hunter's performance, giving it only a maximum flight endurance of about an hour. A fatal accident occurred on 8 February 1956, when a flight of eight Hunters was diverted to another airfield owing to adverse weather conditions. Six of the eight aircraft ran out of fuel and crashed, killing one pilot.

Another difficulty encountered during the aircraft's introduction was the occurrence of surging and stalling with the Avon engines. The F.2, which used the Armstrong-Siddeley Sapphire engine, did not suffer from this defect. Further problems occurred; ejected cannon ammunition links had a tendency to strike and damage the underside of the fuselage, and diverting the gas emitted by the cannon during firing was another necessary modification. The original split-flap airbrakes caused adverse changes in pitch trim and were quickly replaced by a single ventral airbrake. This meant, however, that the airbrake could not be used for landings.

To address the problem of range, a production Hunter F.1 was fitted with a modified wing featuring bag-type fuel tanks in the leading edge and two (or 4 on later aircraft) "wet" hardpoints for 100-gallon drop tanks. The resulting Hunter F.4 first flew on 20 October 1954, and entered service in March 1955. A distinctive Hunter feature added on the F.4 was the pair of blisters under the cockpit, which collected spent ammunition links to prevent airframe damage. Crews dubbed them "Sabrinas" after the contemporary movie star. The Sapphire-powered version of the F.4 was designated the Hunter F.5.

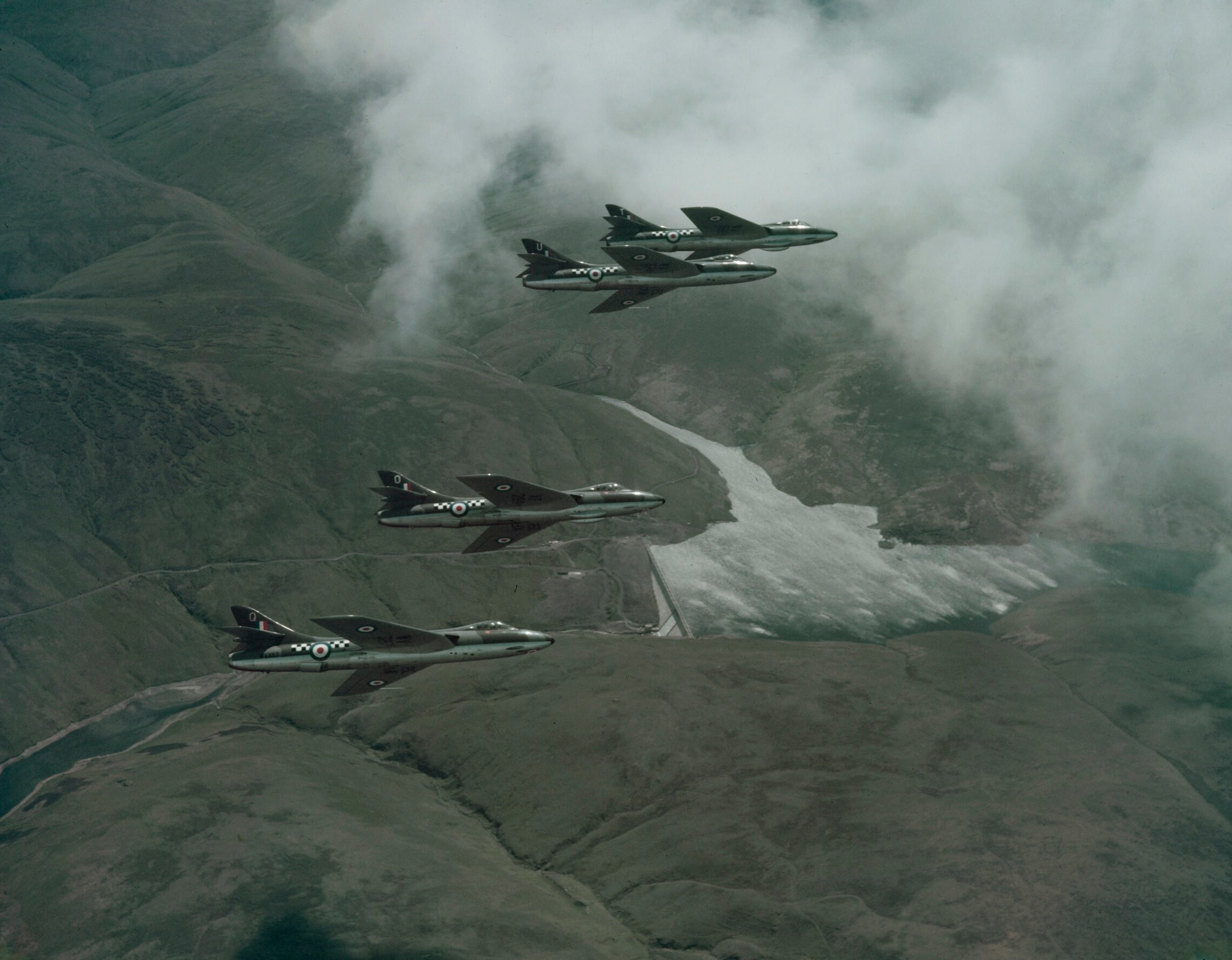
Four Hunters of No. 43 Squadron in flight, c. 1956

The RAF later received Hunters equipped with an improved Avon engine. The Avon 203 produced 10,000 lbf (44 kN) of thrust and was fitted to XF833, which became the first Hunter F.6. Some other revisions on the F.6 included a revised fuel tank layout, the centre fuselage tanks being replaced by new slightly smaller ones in the rear fuselage; the distinctive "dogtooth" leading edge extension (Mod 533) to alleviate the pitch-up problem; the "Mod 228" wing, with increased structural strength and four (rather than the previous two) "wet" hardpoints, finally giving the aircraft a good ferry range. The Hunter F.6 was given the company designation Hawker P.1099.

During the Suez Crisis of 1956, Hunter F.5s of No. 1 and No. 34 Squadrons based at RAF Akrotiri in Cyprus flew escort for English Electric Canberra bombers on offensive missions into Egypt. For most of the conflict the Hunters engaged in local air defence due to their lack of range.

During the Brunei Revolt in 1962, the Royal Air Force deployed Hunters and Gloster Javelins over Brunei to provide support for British ground forces; Hunters launched both dummy and real strafing runs on ground targets to intimidate and pin down rebels. In one event, several Bruneian and expatriate hostages were due to be executed by rebels. Hunter aircraft flew over Limbang while Royal Marines from 42 Commando rescued the hostages in a fierce battle. In the following years of the Borneo Confrontation, Hunters were deployed along with other RAF aircraft in Borneo and Malaya.

The Hunter F.6 was retired from its day fighter role in the RAF by 1963, being replaced by the much faster English Electric Lightning interceptor. Many F.6s were then given a new lease of life in the close air support role, converting into the Hunter FGA.9 variant. (Note: Originally it had been planned to task the Folland Gnat with the low-level ground attack missions; however, Hawker converted two aircraft and demonstrated in trials that the Hunter was able to significantly out-perform the Gnat, thus the Hunter was selected instead.) The FGA.9 saw frontline use from 1960 to 1971, alongside the closely related Hunter FR.10 tactical reconnaissance variant. The Hunters were also used by two RAF display units; the Black Arrows of No. 111 Squadron who set a record by looping and barrel rolling 22 Hunters in formation, and later the Blue Diamonds of No. 92 Squadron who flew 16 Hunters.

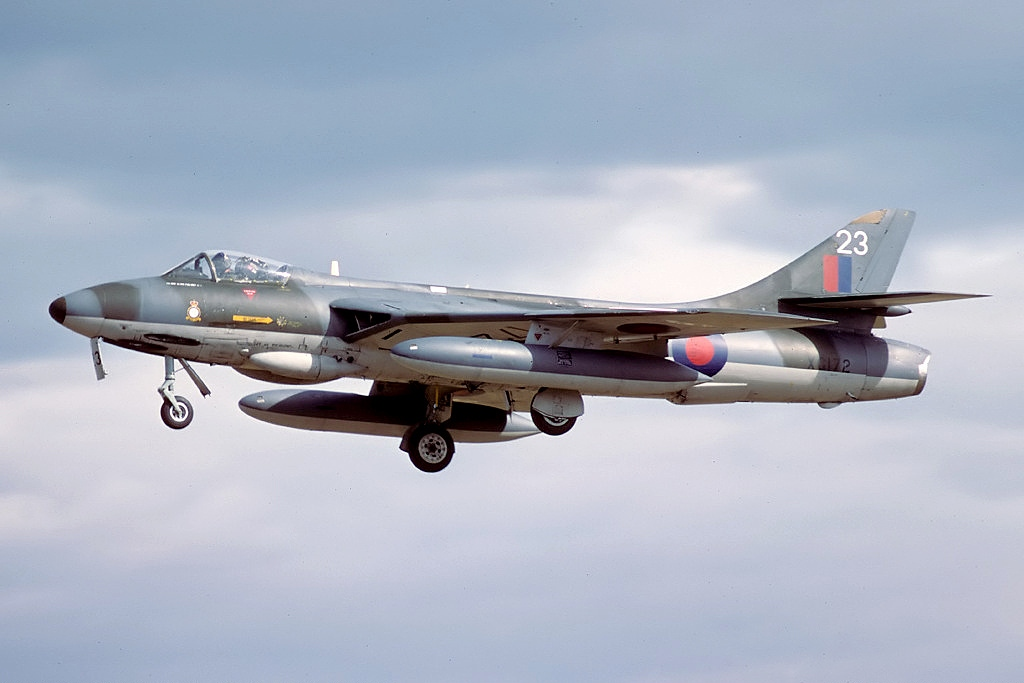
Hunter F.6A, 1979

In Aden in May 1964, Hunter FGA.9s and FR.10s of No. 43 Squadron RAF and No. 8 Squadron RAF were used extensively during the Radfan campaign against insurgents attempting to overthrow the Federation of South Arabia. SAS forces would routinely call in air strikes that required considerable precision, and, predominantly using 3-inch high explosive rockets and 30 mm ADEN cannon, the Hunter proved an able ground-attack platform. Both squadrons continued operations with their Hunters until the UK withdrew from Aden in November 1967.

Hunters were flown by No.63, No. 234 and No. 79 Squadrons acting in training roles for foreign and Commonwealth students. These remained in service until after the Hawk T.1 entered service in the mid-1970s. Two-seat trainer versions of the Hunter, the T.7 and T.8, remained in use for training and secondary roles by the RAF and Royal Navy until the early 1990s; when the Blackburn Buccaneer retired from service. The requirement for Hunter trainers disappeared so the Buccaneer-orientated trainers were retired, leaving the RN T.8Ms to soldier on for a while longer.

Hunters were also used by the Empire Test Pilots' School at MoD Boscombe Down. The Hunter is unusual among swept wing jet aircraft in being able to be safely spun inverted. This would be demonstrated to students of the school.

=== Royal Danish Air Force ===
As early as 1953 the first Hunter flew over Denmark, when test pilot Neville Duke demonstrated the F.1 over Copenhagen Airport. During this demonstration, the pilot broke the sound barrier in a shallow dive.

Air Force officials were very impressed with the demonstration and since the Royal Danish Air Force (RDAF) were looking for a replacement for the Gloster Meteors in service at the time, the Hunter was a natural choice. Consequently, a contract for delivery of 30 F.51 was signed on 3 July 1954. RDAF took delivery of the first two of these on 31 January 1956 and nine months later all 30 Hunters had been delivered to 724 Squadron.

Since the Hunter was a significantly different aircraft to fly, compared to older types such as the Meteor, the need for a two-seat trainer soon arose, and the RDAF took delivery of two T.53 two-seat trainers in 1958.

In contrast to most other users of the Hunter, RDAF never converted the Hunter to the fighter-bomber role. Although some studies and experiments carried out in 1959, the project never materialised and the Hunter carried on as a day fighter until its retirement in 1974.

The last flight of the Hunter in RDAF service was carried out on 30 April 1974. The entire fleet was initially preserved at Aalborg Air Base, in the hopes of a future sale to other users. No such sale was ever carried out, but 16 F.51s and four T.53 (two additional T.53 had been purchased from the Netherlands in 1967) were sent back to Hawker Siddeley in December 1975. Ultimately, most Hunters were sold either to private buyers or to military museums around the world. Only one example (47-401/E-401) was reserved for museum use in Denmark and currently resides in Danmarks Flymuseum in Stauning.

=== Indian Air Force ===
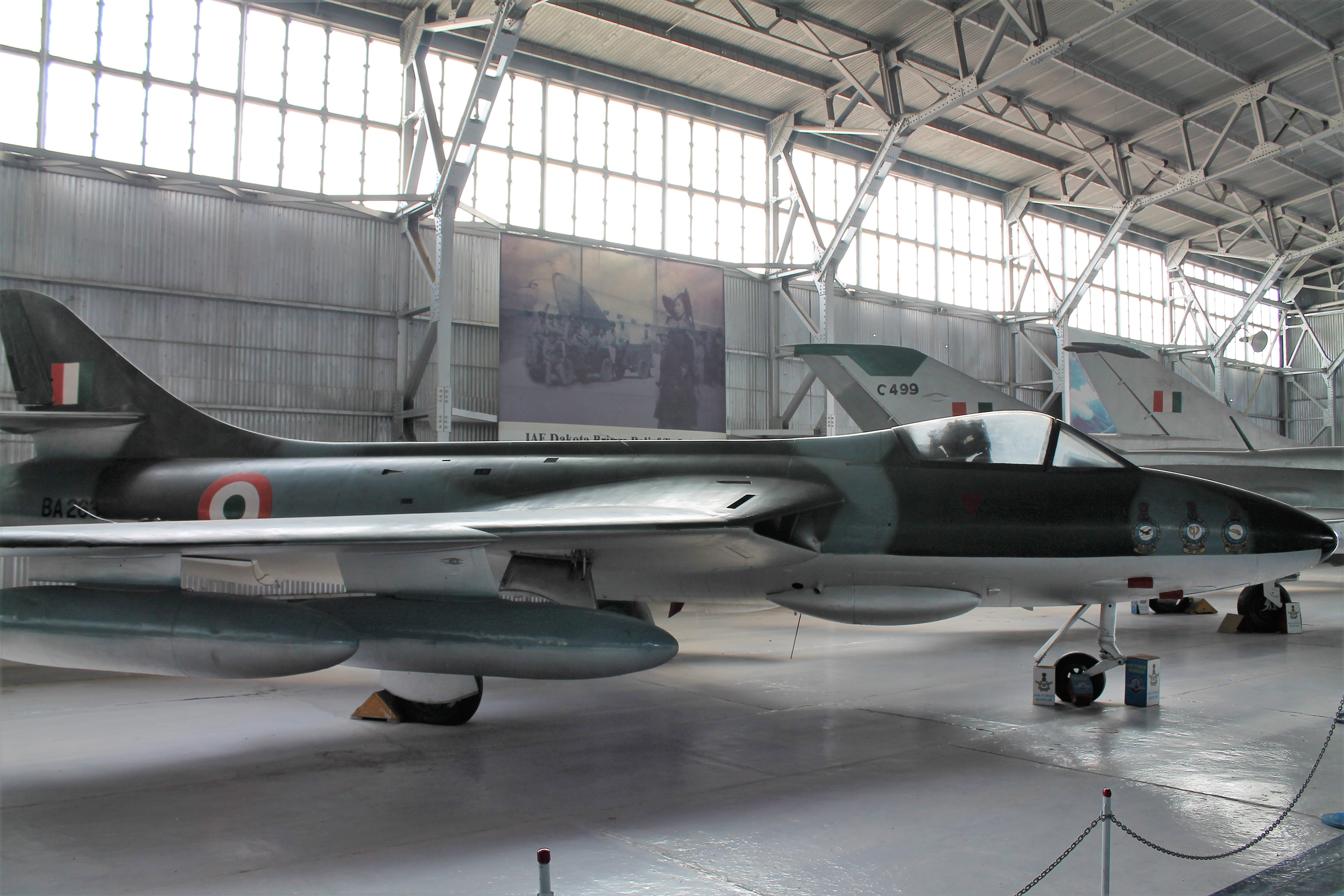
Indian Air Force Hawker Hunter in the Indian Air Force Museum, Palam

In 1954, India arranged to purchase Hunters as a part of a wider arms deal with Britain, ordering 140 Hunter single-seat fighters at the same time that Pakistan announced its purchase of several North American F-86 Sabre jet fighters. The Indian Air Force (IAF) was the first to operate the Hunter T.66 trainers, placing an initial order in 1957. The more powerful engine was considered beneficial in a hot environment, allowing for greater takeoff weights. During the 1960s, Pakistan investigated the possibility of buying as many as 40 English Electric Lightnings, but Britain was unenthusiastic about the potential sales opportunity because of the damage it would do to its relations with India, which at the time was still awaiting the delivery of large numbers of ex-RAF Hunters.

By the outbreak of the Sino-Indian War in 1962, India had assembled one of the largest air forces in Asia, and the Hunter was the nation's primary and most capable interceptor. During the conflict, the Hunter demonstrated its superiority over China's Russian-sourced MiGs and gave India a strategic advantage in the air. (Note: Nikita Khrushchev had become distrustful of Mao Zedong, and withheld major technologies such as new Soviet fighter aircraft, thus China's MiGs were very early jet aircraft only.(See Sino–Soviet split)) India's aerial superiority deterred Chinese Ilyushin Il-4 bombers from attacking targets within India. In 1962, India had selected to procure its first supersonic-capable fighter, the Mikoyan-Gurevich MiG-21; large numbers of Russian-built fighters had increasingly supplemented the ageing Hunters in the interceptor role by 1970.

The Hunter was to play a major role during the Indo-Pakistani War of 1965; (Note: The IAF had 118 Hunters at their disposal at the beginning of the 1965 conflict.) along with the Folland Gnat, the Hunter was India's primary air defence fighter, and regularly engaged in dogfights with the Pakistani F-86 Sabres and F-104 Starfighters. The aerial war saw both sides conducting thousands of sorties in a single month. Both sides claimed victory in the air war, Pakistan claimed to have destroyed 104 aircraft against its own losses of 19, while India claimed to have destroyed 73 enemy aircraft and lost 35 of its own. Despite the intense fighting, the conflict was effectively a stalemate.

IAF Hunters performed extensive operations during the Indo-Pakistani War of 1971; India had six combat-ready squadrons of Hunters at the start of the conflict. (Note: Each squadron typically had 16 aircraft, meaning India had roughly 96 Hunters available.) Pakistani infantry and armoured forces attacked the Indian outpost of Longewala in an event now known as the Battle of Longewala. Six IAF Hunters stationed at Jaisalmer Air Force Base were able to halt the Pakistani advance at Longewala by conducting non-stop bombing raids. The aircraft attacked Pakistani tanks, armoured personnel carriers and gun positions and contributed to the increasingly chaotic battlefield conditions, which ultimately led to the retreat of Pakistan's ground forces. (Note: The Hunters were not fitted with night vision equipment, and as such were delayed from conducting combat missions until dawn.) Hunters were also used for many ground-attack missions and raids inside Pakistan's borders, such as the high-profile bombing of the Attock Oil refinery to limit Pakistani fuel supplies. In the aftermath of the conflict, Pakistan claimed to have shot down a total of 32 of India's Hunters.

Due to unfavourable currency conditions and conflicting pressures on the military budget, several prospective procurements of modern aircraft such as the SEPECAT Jaguar and the British Aerospace Sea Harrier were put on hold following the 1971 war; the indigenously developed HAL HF-24 Marut had also not been as successful as hoped, thus the IAF decided to retain the ageing fleets of Hunters and English Electric Canberra bombers. After considering several foreign aircraft to replace the Hunter, including the Dassault Mirage F1, the Saab 37 Viggen, and several Soviet models, the Indian government announced its intention to procure 200 Jaguars, a large portion of which were to be assembled domestically, in October 1978. In 1996, the last of the IAF's Hunters were phased out of service, the last squadron operating Hunters later converting to the newer Sukhoi Su-30MKI.

=== Swedish Air Force ===
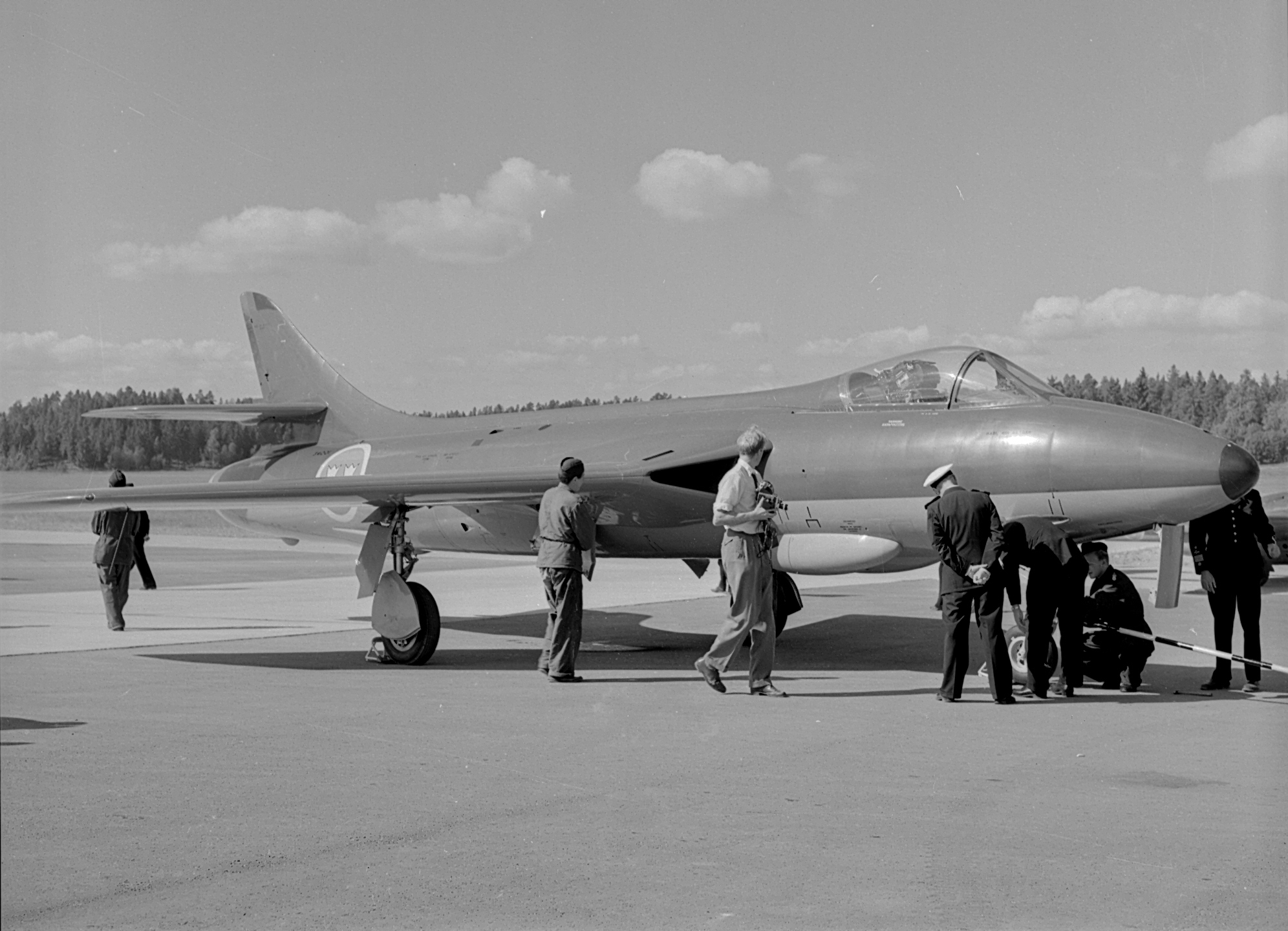
Swedish Air Force J 34 Hunter, 1955

In the early 1950s, the Swedish Air Force saw the need for an interceptor that could reach enemy bombers at higher altitudes than those attainable by the Saab J 29 Tunnan, which formed the backbone of the fighter force. With the delivery of the supersonic Saab J 35 Draken still a few years away, a contract for 120 Hawker Hunter Mk 50s (equivalent to the Mk 4) was therefore signed on 29 June 1954 and the first aircraft was delivered on 26 August 1955. The model was designated J 34 and was assigned to the F 8 and F 18 wings that were tasked with defending Stockholm. The J 34 was armed with four 30 mm (1.18 in) cannon and two Sidewinders. The Swedish Air Force's aerobatic team Acro Hunters used five J 34s during the late 1950s. During the 1960s the J 34s were reassigned to air wings F 9 in Gothenburg and F 10 in Ängelholm, as F 8 was repurposed and F 18 rearmed with the J 35 Draken. The last of the J 34s was retired from service in 1969.

A project to improve the performance of the J 34 resulted in one Hunter being fitted with a Swedish-designed afterburner in 1958. While this significantly increased the engine's thrust, there was little improvement in overall performance, so the project was shelved.

=== Swiss Air Force ===
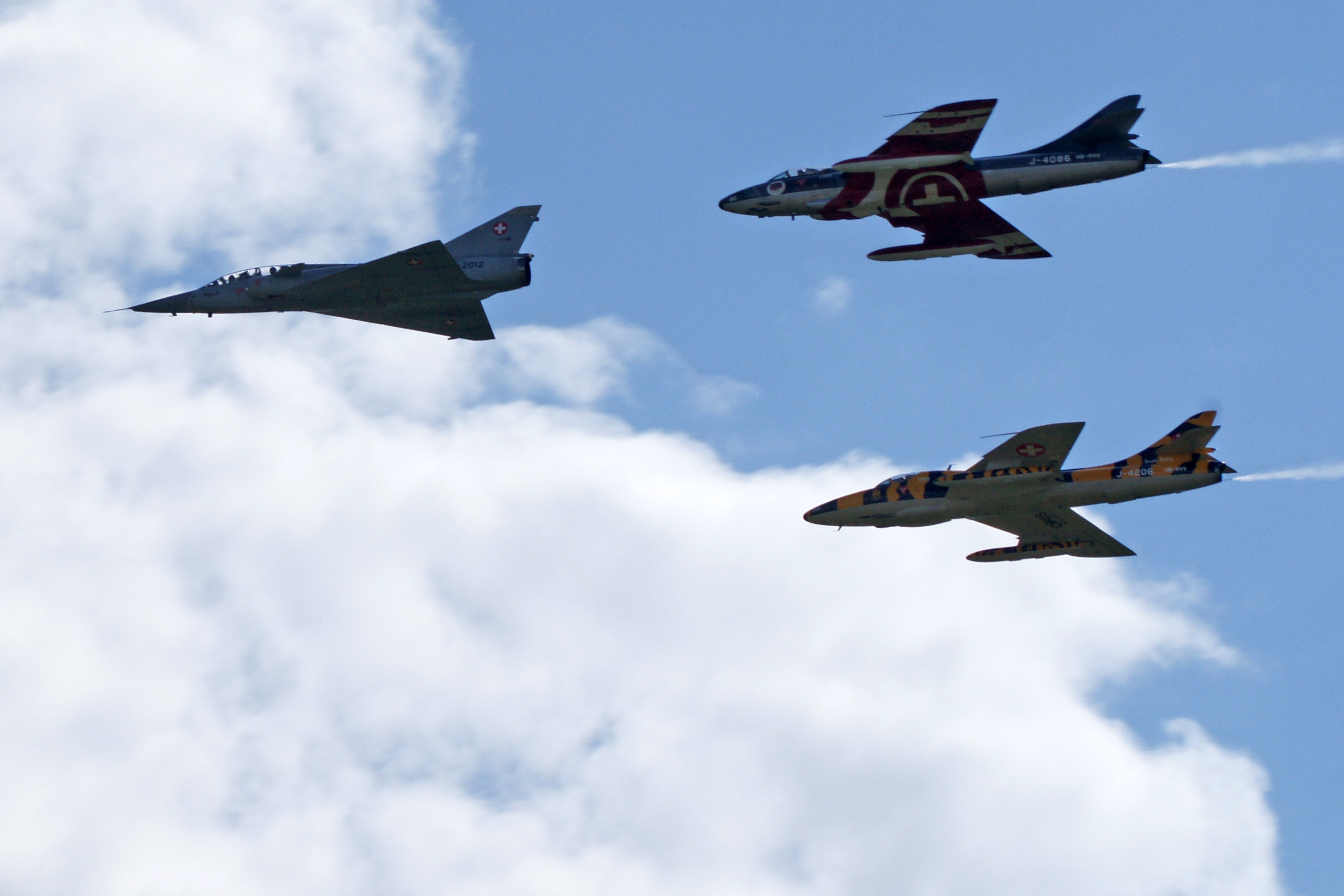
A pair of ex-Swiss Air Force Hunters flying in close formation behind a single Mirage III, 2011

In 1957, the Swiss Air Force performed an extensive evaluation of several aircraft for a prospective purchase; competitors included the North American F-86 Sabre, the Folland Gnat, and the Hawker Hunter; a pair of Hunters were loaned to the Swiss for further trials and testing. In January 1958, the government of Switzerland chose to terminate its independent fighter aircraft project, the in-development FFA P-16, instead choosing to order 100 Hunters to replace its existing fleet of de Havilland Vampire fighters. Further development of the indigenous P-16 was discontinued. This initial order for 100 single-seat Hunters consisted of 12 refurbished RAF F.6s, and 88 new-built F.58s.

Swiss Hunters were operated as interceptors, with a secondary ground-attack role; from 1963 onwards, the outboard wing pylons were modified to carry two AIM-9 Sidewinder air-to-air missiles. In the ground-attack role, the Swiss Air Force maintained an arsenal of conventional iron bombs, a number of compatible napalm bombs were also maintained for intended use by the Hunters. In the interceptor role, the Hunters were supplemented by a surface-to-air missile (SAM) defence system also procured from the United Kingdom, based on the Bristol Bloodhound. In case of unserviceable airstrips, Swiss Air Force jets would take off from adjacent highways, using them as improvised runways.

The Patrouille Suisse flight demonstration team were prominent fliers of the Hawker Hunter for several decades. Squadron aircraft were fitted with smoke generators on the engine exhausts and, later on, were painted in a distinctive red-and-white livery. The group officially formed on 22 August 1964, and used the Hunter as its display aircraft until it was withdrawn from use in 1994, the team continued to perform flight display using newer aircraft.

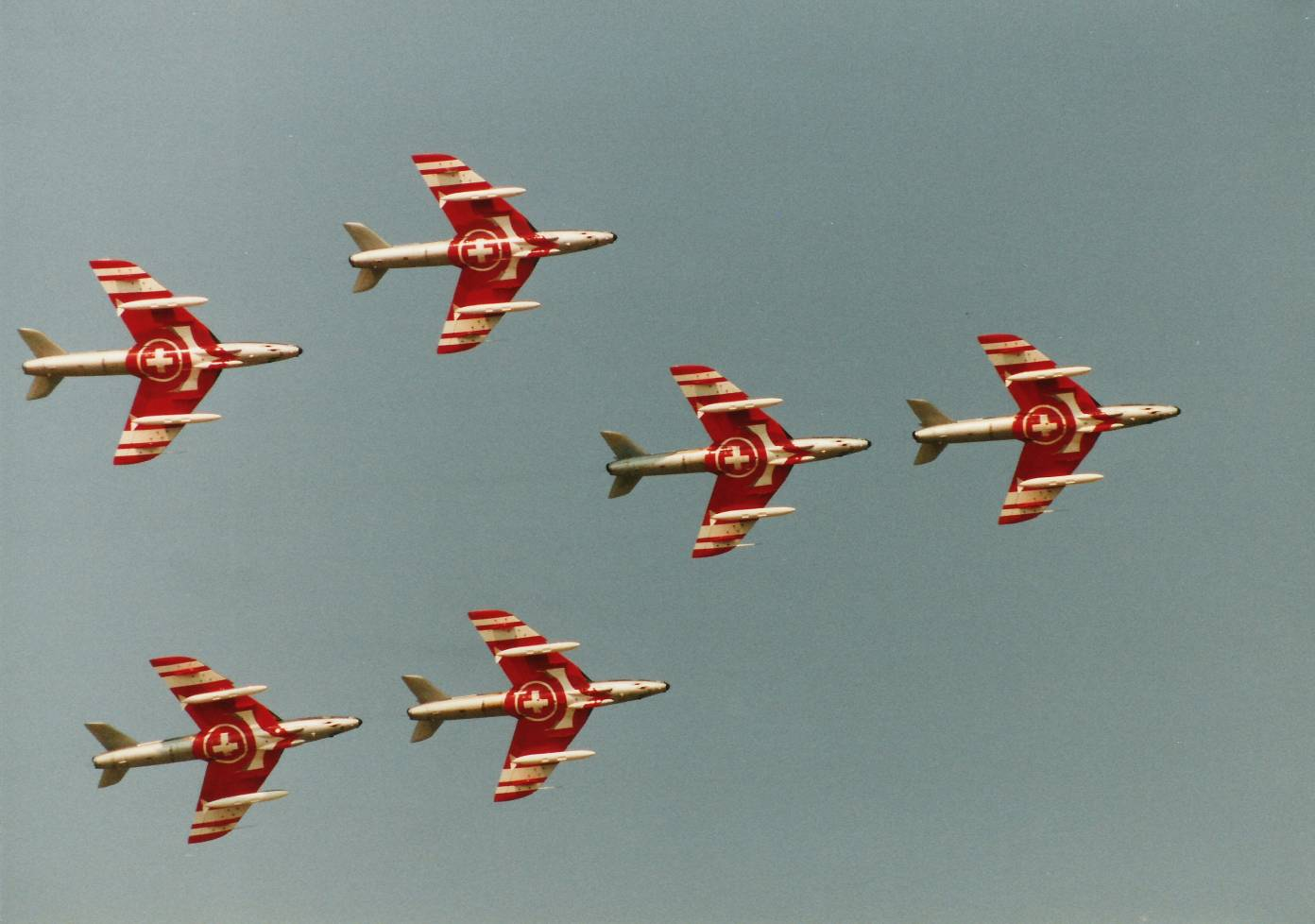
Hunters of the Patrouille Suisse in formation flight, c. 1991

The Hunter fleet endured several attempts to procure successor aircraft to the type; in the case of the Dassault Mirage III this had been due to excessive cost overruns and poor project management rather than the attributes of the Hunter itself. A second attempt to replace the Hunter resulted in a competition between the French Dassault Milan and the U.S. LTV A-7 Corsair II. Although the A-7 was eventually chosen as the winner, it would not be purchased and further 30 refurbished Hunters (22 F.58As and eight T.68 trainers) were purchased in 1974 instead.

By 1975, plans were laid to replace the Hunter in the air-to-air role with a more modern fighter aircraft, the Northrop F-5E Tiger II. The Hunter remained in a key role within the Swiss Air Force; like the RAF's Hunter fleet, the type transitioned to become the country's primary ground attack platform, replacing the Venom. While the Swiss Hunters already had more armament options than the RAF aircraft, being cleared to carry Oerlikon 80 mm rockets instead of the elderly 3-inch rockets used by the RAF, to carry bombs from both inner and outer pylons and to launch AIM-9 Sidewinder air-to-air missiles, the change to a primary air-to-ground role resulted in the Hunter 80 upgrade, adding chaff/flare dispensers, BL755 cluster bombs and the ability to carry AGM-65 Maverick missiles.

In the 1990s, the discovery of wing cracking led to the quick retirement of all Hunter F.58As. The end of the Cold War also allowed Switzerland to retire its Hunters earlier than expected; the Hunter was completely withdrawn from Swiss service in 1994. The Swiss Air Force lost the capability to carry out air-to-ground operations when the Hunters were withdrawn from service.

=== Republic of Singapore Air Force ===
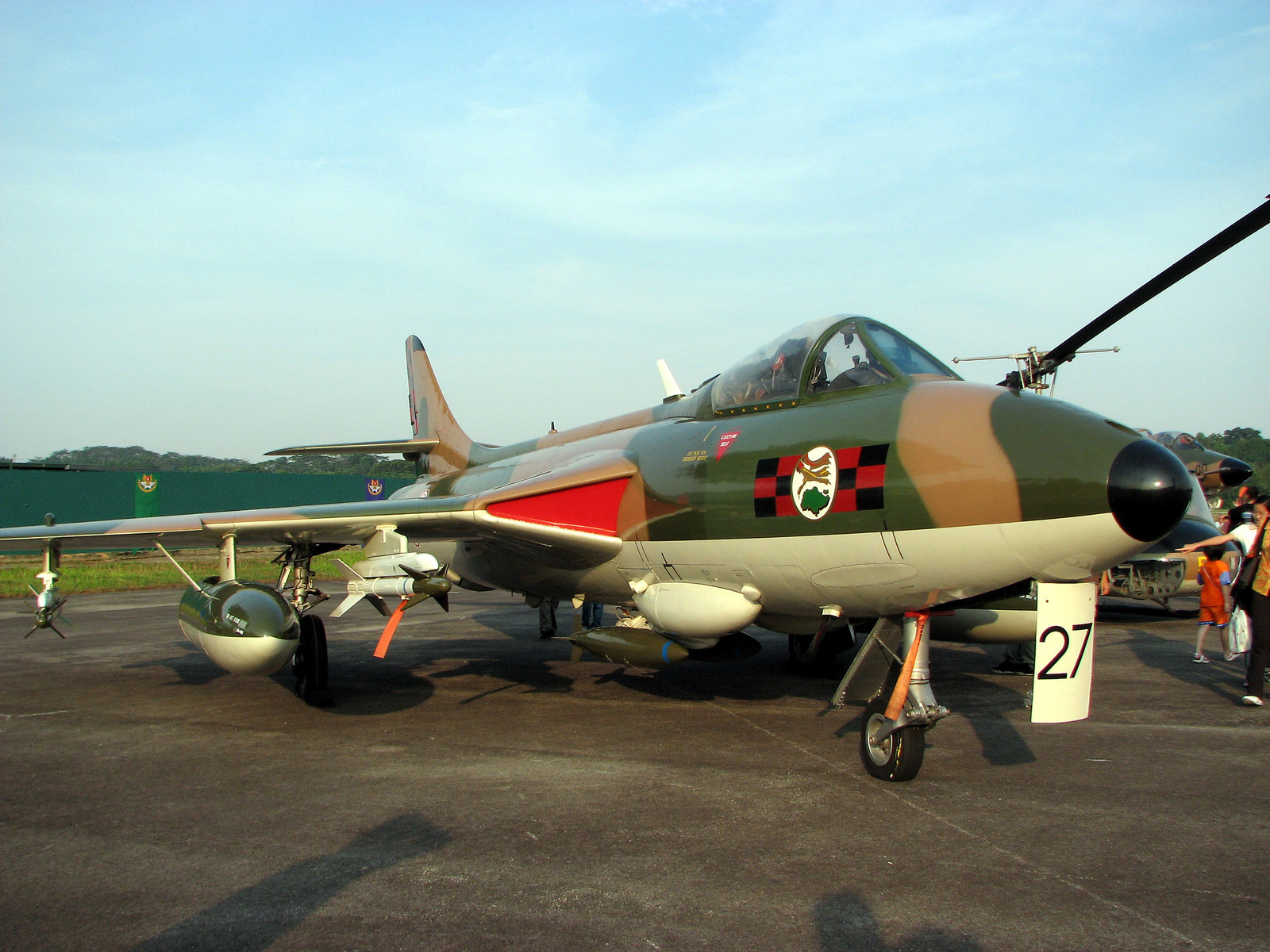
A retired 140 Squadron, Republic of Singapore Air Force Hawker Hunter FGA.74S at the RSAF Museum

Singapore was an enthusiastic operator of the Hunter, first ordering the aircraft in 1968 during a massive expansion of the city-state's armed forces; deliveries began in 1971 and were completed by 1973. At the time, considerable international controversy was generated as Britain (and, as was later revealed, the U.S.) had refused to sell Hunters to neighbouring Malaysia, sparking fears of a regional arms race and accusations of favouritism. The Republic of Singapore Air Force (RSAF) eventually received 46 refurbished Hunters to equip two squadrons. (Note: The breakdown of Singapore's Hunter fleet being 12 × FGA.74, 26 × FR.74A/B and 8 × T.75/A (excluding one T.75A lost in an accident before delivery).)

In the late 1970s, the Singaporean Hunter fleet was upgraded and modified by Lockheed Aircraft Services Singapore (LASS) with an additional hardpoint under the forward fuselage and another two inboard pylons (wired only for AIM-9 Sidewinders) before the main gears, bringing to a total of seven hardpoints for external stores and weapons delivery. As a result of these upgrades, they were redesignated as FGA.74S, FR.74S and T.75S. The RSAF Black Knights, Singapore Air Force's aerobatic team, flew Hunters from 1973 until 1989.

By 1991, Singapore's fleet of combat aircraft included the General Dynamics F-16 Fighting Falcon, the Northrop F-5 Tiger II, as well as the locally modernised and upgraded ST Aerospace A-4SU Super Skyhawk; the Hunters were active but obsolete in comparison. The type was finally retired and phased out of service in 1992, with the 21 surviving airframes being sold off to an Australian warbird broker, Pacific Hunter Aviation Pty, in 1995.

=== Lebanese Air Force ===
The Lebanese Air Force operated Hawker Hunters from 1958 to 2014. One Hunter was shot down on the first day of the Six-Day War by the Israeli Air Force. They were used infrequently during the Lebanese Civil War, and eventually fell out of usage and went into storage during the 1980s.

In August 2007, the Lebanese Armed Forces planned to put its Hunters back into service following the 2007 Lebanon conflict, to deal with Fatah al-Islam militants in the Nahr el-Bared camp north of Tripoli. The programme was delayed by lack of spare parts for the aircraft, such as cartridges for the Martin-Baker ejection seats. On 12 November 2008, 50 years after its original introduction, the Lebanese Air Force returned four of its eight Hunters to service with 2nd Squadron, based at Rayak AB: one two-seater and three single-seaters. Military exercises were conducted with Hunters, such as those that took place on 12 July 2010. The Hunters were retired from service during 2014.

=== Others ===
==== Africa ====
During the 1950s, the Royal Rhodesian Air Force was an important export customer of Britain, purchasing not only Hunters but also De Havilland Vampires and Canberra bombers. Rhodesia later deployed its Hunter FGA.9s extensively against ZANLA and ZIPRA guerrillas during the Rhodesian Bush War in the late 1960s and throughout the 1970s, occasionally engaging in cross-border raids over Zambia and Mozambique. The Zimbabwean Air Force Hunters were flown to support Laurent Kabila's loyalists during the Second Congo War, and were reported to be involved in the Mozambican Civil War. One remained in service in 2022.

In Somalia, the Siad Barre regime's fleet of ageing Hunters, often piloted by former Rhodesian servicemen, carried out several bombing missions against rebel units in the late 1980s.

==== Belgium and the Netherlands ====
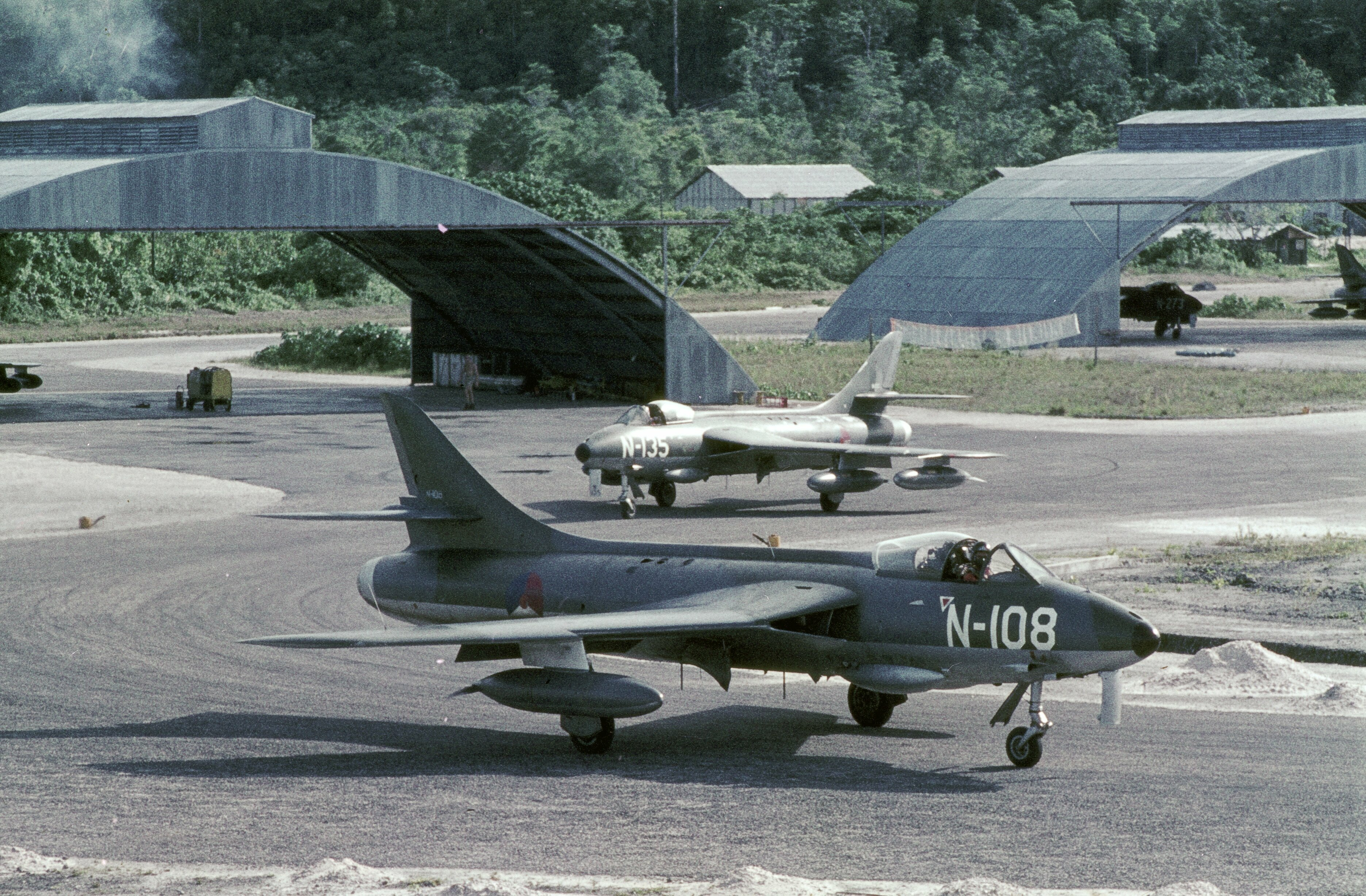
A pair of Dutch Hunter F.4 aircraft operating out of Mokmer airport in New Guinea, 1962.

The Belgian Air Force received 112 Hunter F.4s between 1956 and 1957 to replace the Gloster Meteor F.8. The aircraft were built under licence in both Belgium and the Netherlands in a joint programme, some using US offshore funding. SABCA and Avions Fairey built 64 aircraft in Belgium and a further 48 were built in the Netherlands by Fokker. The Hunters were used by Nos. 1, 3 and 9 Wings but did not serve for long; the aircraft with 1 Wing were replaced in 1958 by the Avro Canada CF-100 Canuck, and most were scrapped afterwards.

The Belgian and Dutch governments subsequently ordered the improved Hunter F.6, with Nos. 1, 7 and 9 Wings of the Belgian Air Force receiving 112 Fokker-built aircraft between 1957 and 1958. Although built in the Netherlands, 29 aircraft had been assembled from kits in Belgium by SABCA and 59 by Avions Fairey, and were operated by 7 and 9 Wings. No. 9 Wing was disbanded in 1960, and by 1963 the Hunter squadrons in 7 Wing had also been disbanded. A large number of the surviving Hunters were sold to Hawker Aircraft and re-built for re-export to India and Iraq, with others to Chile, Kuwait and Lebanon.

In 1960, the Royal Netherlands Air Force sent No. 322 Squadron with its Hunter F.4s and F.6s to Biak in Dutch New Guinea for air defense during the West New Guinea dispute with Indonesia. They were withdrawn from the West New Guinea in October 1962.

==== Middle East ====
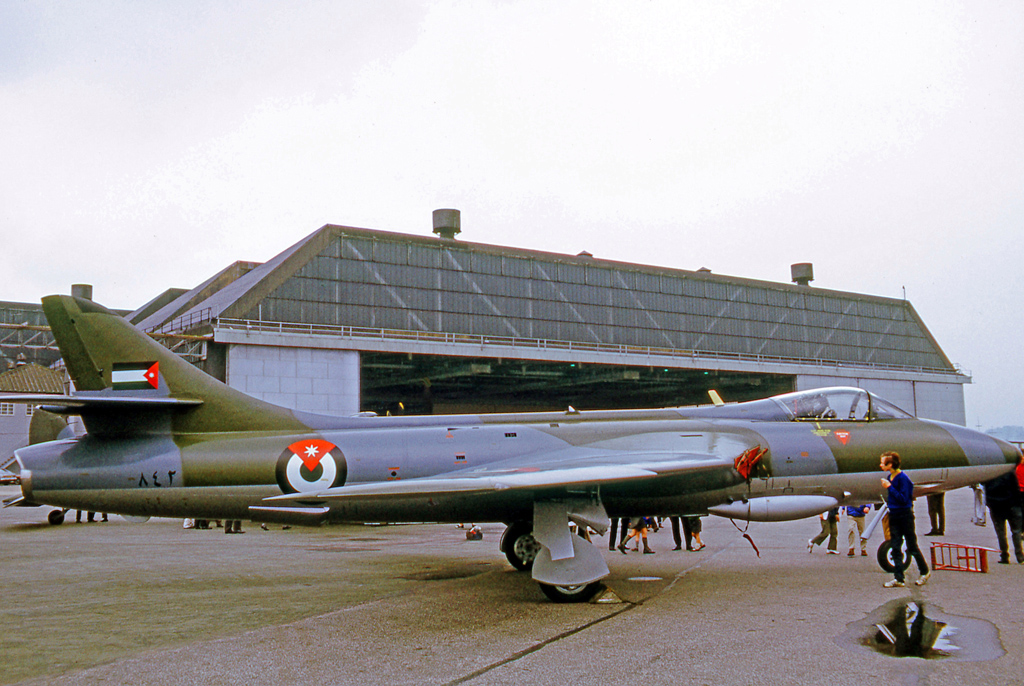
Hunter F.73 of the Royal Jordanian Air Force in 1971

Between 1964 and 1975, both Britain and France delivered significant quantities of arms, including Hunters, to Iraq. The Hunters were far more effective in fighting guerrilla activity than the Russian MiG-17s then operated by Iraq. In December 1964, a dogfight took place between four Israeli Mirage fighters and four Hunters of the Royal Jordanian Air Force. Jordanian pilot Ihsan Shurdom, who later commanded the Royal Jordanian Air Force, was among the Hunter pilots involved in the engagement. Two Mirages were downed and another damaged, without damage to the Hunters.

In 1967, Hunters of the Iraqi Air Force saw action during the Six-Day War between Israel and several neighbouring Arab nations. While flying a Hunter from Iraqi Airbase H3, Flight Lieutenant Saiful Azam, on exchange from the Pakistan Air Force, shot down three Israeli jets including a Sud Aviation Vautour and a Mirage IIICJ. (Note: Israeli sources state that the Mirage III and the Hunter were well matched, the Mirage having more advanced avionics while the Hunter had greater agility.) Shurdom also flew Hunters from Iraq during the war and took part in the air combat over H3. Most of the Jordanian Hunters, however, were destroyed on the ground on the first day of the Six-Day War. Replacement Hunters for Jordanian service were acquired from both Britain and Saudi Arabia in the war's aftermath.

During the War of Attrition, Iraqi Hunters usually operated from bases in Egypt and Syria. Jordanian Hunters were later used with considerable success in ground attacks against Syrian Army tanks during the Black September Crisis.

==== South America ====
During the 1960s and 1970s, Chile completed the acquisition of Hunters from Britain for service in the Chilean Air Force. In June 1973, the Liberian oil tanker Napier ran aground on Guamblin Island, accidentally releasing 30,000 tons of oil. After the rescue of the crew, the vessel was fired upon and set on fire by Chilean Hunters in an effort to burn the oil to avoid further environmental contamination.

During the 1973 Chilean coup d'état, some of the Hunters were used by military officers as part of the effort to successfully overthrow the democratically elected president of Chile, Salvador Allende, on 11 September 1973. On 10 September 1973, coup leaders ordered the Hunters to relocate to Talcahuano in preparation. The following morning, the aircraft were used to conduct bombing missions against Palacio de La Moneda, Allende's official residence in Santiago, and several radio stations loyal to the government. The UK had signed contracts prior to the Chilean coup d'état for delivery of a further seven Hunters, as well as performing engine overhauls and the delivery of other equipment. The government under Prime Minister James Callaghan delayed the delivery of the aircraft, along with vessels and submarines also on order; the trade unions took action to block delivery of refurbished Hunter engines at the East Kilbride plant until October 1978. The action was led by Rolls-Royce workers Bob Fulton, Robert Sommerville and John Keenan, who hid the engines in the factory. The government of Chile bestowed on 16 April 2015, its highest civilian medal, the Order Bernardo O'Higgins Medal, on the three workers for their action of solidarity. The protest is the subject of the 2018 documentary film Nae Pasaran. In 1982, after the Falklands War, a number of Hunters were air freighted to Chile as part of the arrangements for providing support for UK operations in the South Atlantic.

The purchase of Hunters by Chile may have been a factor in the decision by the Peruvian Air Force to acquire Hunters of its own. Britain was keen to sell to Peru as the decision to sell Hunters to Chile became a controversial political issue for the British government following the Chilean coup; the sale also upheld Britain's concept of regional "balancing".

== Operators ==
=== Military operators ===
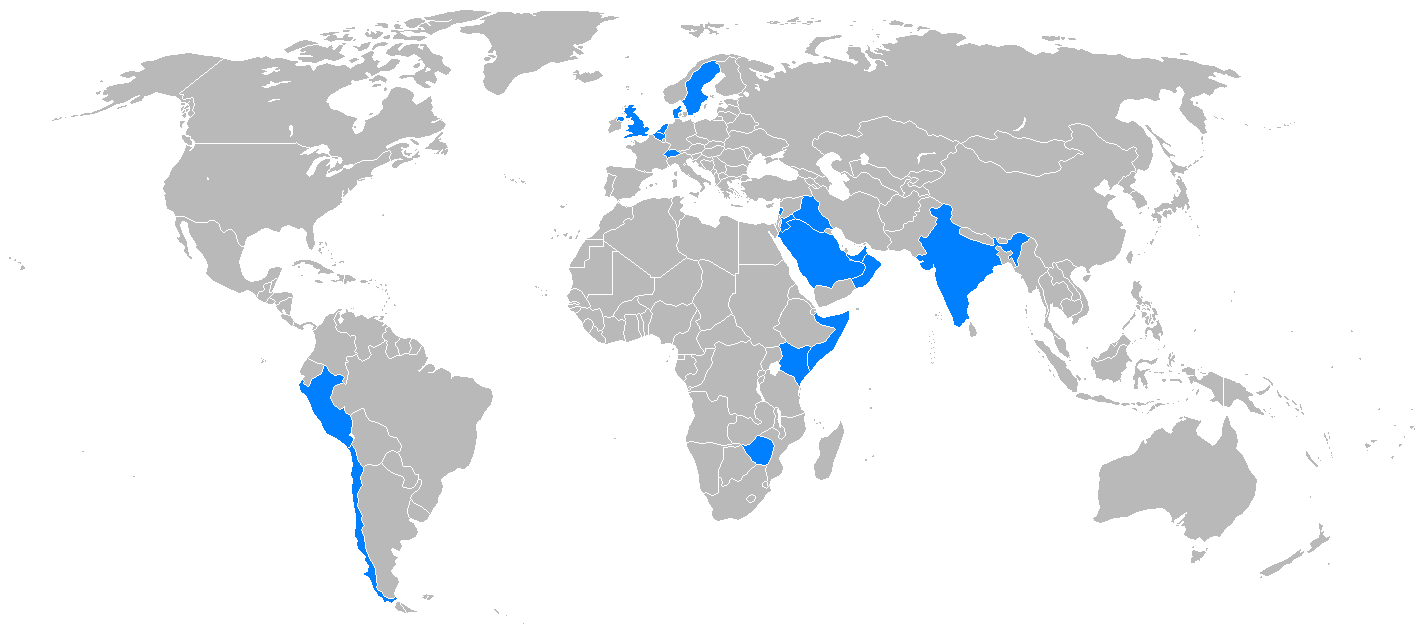
Hunter operators

External videos
- Cockpit recording of flight between St Athan and RAF Cranwell
- Documentary on the Hunter's role in the Battle of Longewala
- Footage from Swiss Hunter exercise in 1991, including take offs performed upon public roads

- Abu Dhabi
- Belgium
- Chile
- Denmark
- Iraq
- India
- Jordan
- Kenya
- Kuwait
- Lebanon
- Netherlands
- Oman
- Peru
- Qatar
- Rhodesia
- Saudi Arabia
- Singapore
- Somalia
- Sweden
- Switzerland
- United Kingdom
- Zimbabwe

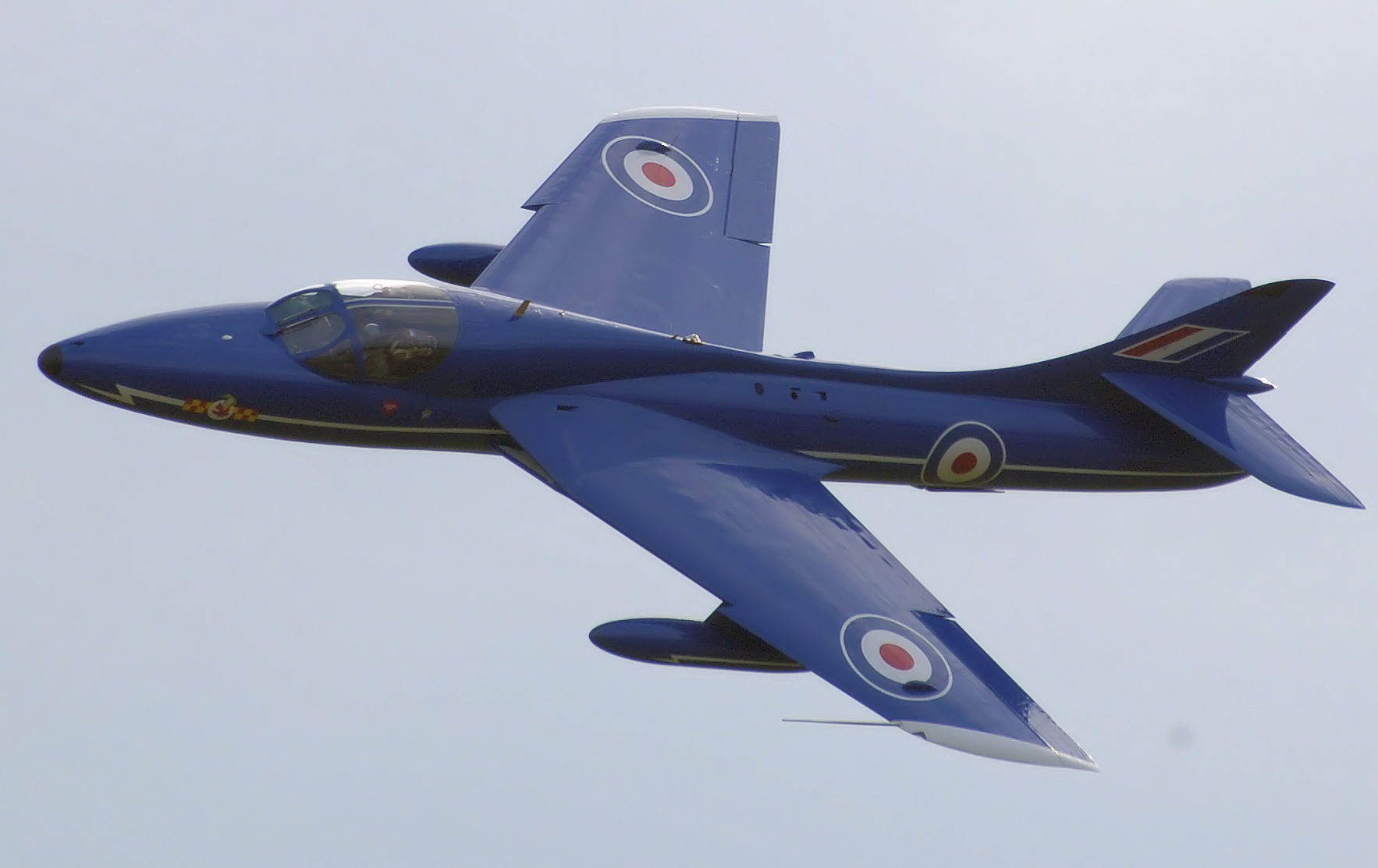
Hunter T.7 restored by Delta Jets now Vintage Flyers at Kemble Airport, England

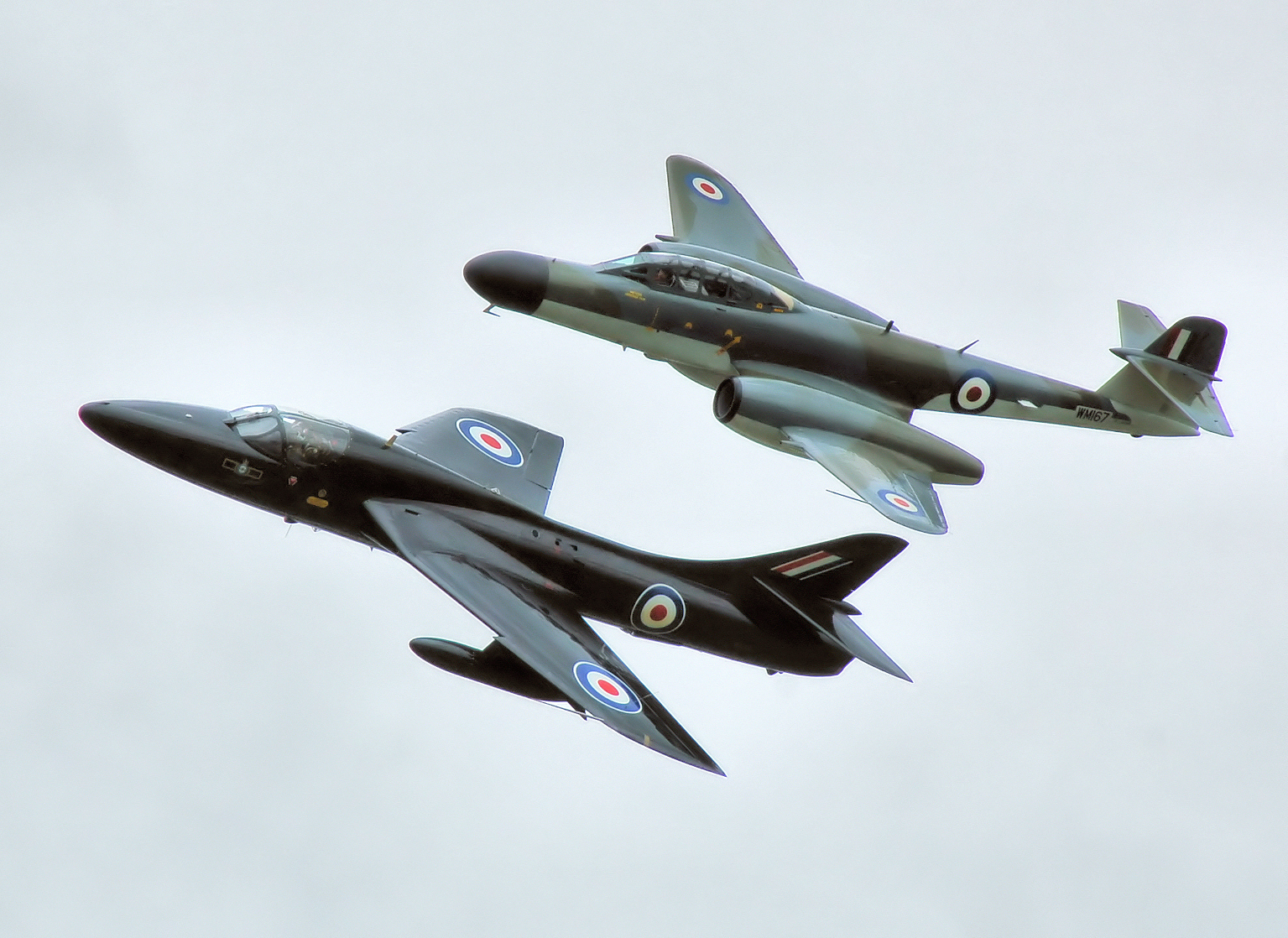
Gloster Meteor NF.11 flies with Hunter Flight Academy's Hawker Hunter T.7A G-FFOX at Kemble Air Show 2009

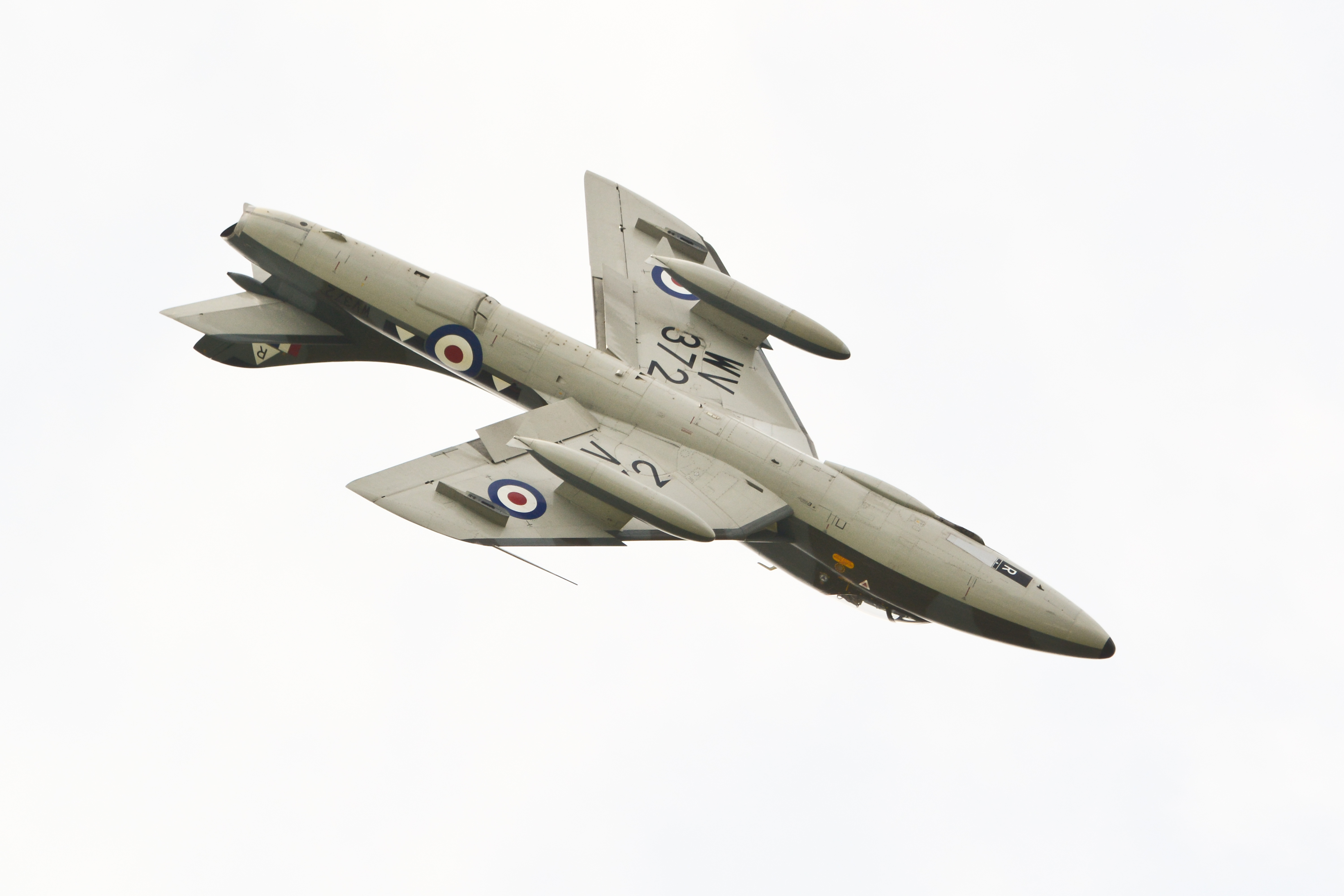
Hunter T.7 aerobatics, Shoreham Airshow 2014. This aircraft was destroyed in the 2015 Shoreham Airshow crash.

=== Civil ===
A number of civil organisations operate or have operated Hunters for use as aerial targets and for threat simulation under contract with the military. Other Hunters are owned and operated for public display and demonstration:

Airborne Tactical Advantage Company (ATAC)

- The American company ATAC, based at Williamsburg International Airport in Newport News, Virginia, has operated 14 former Swiss F.58s on United States government contracts, though three have since been lost in accidents.

Apache Aviation

- Contracted by the French Navy, Apache is based at Istres in Provence, France, with frequent deployments to Lorient and Landivisiau in Brittany, other locations as required. Operates two single-seater and one two-seat Hunters. Operations are associated with Lortie Aviation.

Delta Jets

- Operated between 1995 and 2010 from Kemble Airport near Cirencester, England with three operational Hunters. The company went into liquidation in 2010, Hunter G-FFOX (WV318) is now operated by the Hunter Flight academy.

Dutch Hawker Hunter Foundation

- Operated a Hunter T.8C two-seater in RNLAF markings and a single-seat Hunter F.6A in Dutch markings, based at Leeuwarden Air Base in the Netherlands. The two-seater experienced a maintenance problem in 2020, at which point it was decided, that it would be easier, buying another Hunter instead of fixing it. The single-seat Hunter finished flying in 2022. The then acquired swiss two-seater should again be registered in the UK, but never was registered after its flight from St. Gallen–Altenrhein Airport to St. Athan.

Embraer

- Operates an ex-Chilean Air Force Hunter T.72 as a flight test chase plane.

Hawker Hunter Aviation

- Based at RAF Leeming, it operates a fleet of 12 Mk 58 and three two-seaters (T.7 and T.8), as well as other aircraft to provide high speed aerial threat simulation, mission support training and trials support services.

Hunter Flight Academy.

- Operates a Hunter T.7A G-FFOX (WV318) callsign "FireFox" – a two-seat Hunter in 111sqn "Black Arrows" colours and markings. The Hunter T.7A is based at North Weald Airfield in the UK.

Horizon Aircraft Services Ltd. (formerly Hunter Flying Ltd.)

- Based at MOD St Athan in Wales, Horizon maintains over 15 privately owned examples of the Hunter.

International Test Pilots School

- International Test Pilots School - three aircraft operating from the London International Airport, London, Ontario, Canada.

Lortie Aviation

- Lortie Aviation of Canada (formerly known as Northern Lights Combat Air Support) is based in Quebec City and owns 21 Hunters (mainly ex-Swiss F.58 variants) that are leased out for military training duties. In August 2021, Lortie was successful as the only bidder to purchase five jets and the spare parts from the Lebanese Air Force, for a price expected to be around US$1m. They were believed to have not been operational since 2010.

Thunder City

- Three flyable Hunters were based at Thunder City at Cape Town International Airport in South Africa. Four (of the seven) Hunters owned by Thunder City were up for auction in April 2013

Hangar 51

- Following the death of Thunder City owner Mike "Beachy" Head in May 2017, at the end of 2021, Jay Smith, an ex oil entrepreneur with a passion for fast jets and head of South African aircraft maintenance company Hangar 51, bought the remains of the Thunder City collection from Mike Beachy Head's estate. At least 2 of the Thunder city Hunters were included, Hunter T.2 ZU-CTN and yellow-painted T.8 ZU-AUJ. Thunder City once owned the world’s largest civil collection of ex-military jets including three English Electric Lightnings, three Blackburn Buccaneers, seven Hawker Hunters, one Aerospatiale Puma (a demonstrator of the company’s upgrade and refurbishment services), a Jet Provost and a Gloster Javelin FAW Mk.1 (RAF No. XA553, mounted as a “Gate Guard” on display at the entrance to the company premises).

== Aircraft on display ==
- Hunter F.1 WT612 Gate Guardian at RAF Henlow
- Hunter F.4 at Royal Museum of the Armed Forces and Military History, Brussels, Belgium
- Hunter F.1 at Vanguard Self Storage Staples Corner, London
- Hunter F.6 XF527 - Gate guardian at RAF Halton
- Hunter FGA.9 XG154 on static display at RAF Museum, Hendon
- Hunter F.1 at Caernarfon Airworld Museum, Wales
- Hunter T.8C WV396 at Tacla Taid Transport Museum, Anglesey, Wales
- Hunter GA.11 WV382 on static display at East Midlands Aeropark, Leicestershire
- Hunter F.6A XE627 at the Imperial War Museum Duxford, Cambridgeshire
- Hunter FR.10 XJ714 on static display at East Midlands Aeropark, Leicestershire
- Hunter FR.10 XG172 / XG168 on static display at City of Norwich Aviation Museum in Horsham St Faith, Norfolk.
- Hunter T.7 XL565 at Bruntingthorpe Aerodrome, Leicestershire (including sections of WT745 & XL591)
- Hunter F.6A XG225 at Royal Air Force Museum Midlands
- Hunter T.7A XL 568 at Royal Air Force Museum Midlands
- Hunter T.7 XL569 on static display at East Midlands Aeropark, Leicestershire
- Hunter T.8M XL580 at the Fleet Air Arm Museum, Somerset
- Hunter F.6 on display at the National Air Force Museum of Canada in Trenton, Ontario
- Hunter T.7 XL600 on display at the Jet Aircraft Museum, London, Ontario, Canada.
- Hunter T.7 XL623 under restoration by the Hawker Association at Dunsfold Park, Surrey
- Hunter FGA.78 N-268 at Yorkshire Air Museum, Elvington, North Yorkshire
- Hunter T.7 XL572 painted blue to represent the Blue Diamonds formation teams lead XL571 at Yorkshire Air Museum, Elvington, North Yorkshire
- Hunter T.7 XL618 at Newark Air Museum, Newark-on-Trent, Nottinghamshire
- Hunter F.1 WT651 at Newark Air Museum, Newark-on-Trent, Nottinghamshire
- Hunter F.1 WT680 at the Anglia Motel, on the A17 West of King's Lynn in Fleet Hargate, Lincolnshire
- Hunter F.6 XF527 gate guard at RAF Halton, Halton, Buckinghamshire
- Hunter F.6 XF437, later FR-74S at Historical Aircraft Restoration Society, Wollongong, NSW
- Hunter Mk 50 at Flygvapenmuseum, Linköping, Sweden
- Hunter Mk 50 at Svedinos Bil- och Flygmuseum, Ugglarp, Sweden
- Hunter F.4 N-122 is in storage at the Nationaal Militair Museum, Soesterberg, The Netherlands.
- Hunter F6 XE614 on display at Queensland Air Museum, Caloundra
- Hunter F4 XF311 on display at Queensland Air Museum, Caloundra
- Hunter F.4 N-144 is on display at the Nationaal Militair Museum, Soesterberg, The Netherlands.
- Hunter F.4 N-112 is now on display at Dirgantara Mandala Museum, Yogyakarta, Indonesia.
- Hunter F.51 401 is now on display at Danmarks Flymuseum, Stauning, Denmark
- Hunter F.51 409 repainted as XE683 F Mk.4 on static display at City of Norwich Aviation Museum in Horsham St Faith, Norfolk.
- Hunter F.51 410 repainted as WV395 is now on display at Aviodrome, Lelystad Airport, The Netherlands
- Hunter F.2 WN904 is on display at Sywell Aviation Museum
- Hunter F.1 WT619 is on display at Montrose Air Station Museum
- Hunter F.1 WT555 is on display within Vanguard Self Storage Staples Corner, London
- Hunter PR.11 WT723 Gate Guardian at SCC Technology Campus (displayed), Tyseley, Birmingham
- Hunter Mk 58 J-4001, first Swiss Hunter, repainted and with Swiss modifications removed, is on display at Flieger Flab Museum at Dubendorf, Switzerland, along with Mk 58A J-4152 of the second series deliveries 1974, and T.Mk 68 J-4204.
- Hunter Mk 58 J-4013, Swiss test aircraft Hunter (GRD), with dayglow leading wing edges and painted underside is on display at Militärmuseum Wildegg, Switzerland, along with Mk 58 J-4041.
- Hunter Mk 58 J-4035 in correct Swiss markings is on display at the Pima Air & Space Museum in Tucson, AZ.
- Hunter Mk 58 J-4068 in original Swiss markings is on display at the Museo Storico Aeronautico del Friuli Venezia Giulia near Pordenone, Italy.
- Hunter F.6 XG164 is on display at Davidstow Airfield and Cornwall at War Museum, Davidstow, Cornwall, England, PL32 9YF
- Hunter F.3 WB188 is on display at the Tangmere Military Aviation Museum
- Hunter F.5 WP190 is on display at the Tangmere Military Aviation Museum
- Hunter F.6 XG160 is on display at the Bournemouth Aviation Museum. Dorset, England.
- Hunter T.8 WT722 is on display at the Bournemouth Aviation Museum, Dorset, England.

== Accidents and incidents ==
- 8 February 1956 – Hawker Hunter multiple aircraft accident after a sudden deterioration in the weather during a dogfight exercise in Norfolk, England.
- 7 June 1957 – Mid-air collision between two 111 Squadron Hunters during an aerobatic display rehearsal near RAF North Weald, Essex, England. One of the damaged Hunters involved limped as far as Stansted, where it managed to land successfully on the long runway; the other (XF525) crashed onto the Epping-Ongar railway at North Weald (the eastern end of the London Underground Central Line, which closed in 1994). The pilot was killed. The track was badly damaged by wreckage and a steam train was derailed. Three of the 20 passengers were slightly injured and the driver, Arthur Green, who operated out of Stratford Depot, was commended for his actions. Wreckage from the jet could be seen in the area for many years afterwards.
- 24 January 1967 – Mid-air collision between two Iraqi Air Force Hawker Hunter aircraft during a training exercise at Habbaniyah Air Base, Iraq. Both pilots survived and made safe emergency landings including Lt. Samir Zaki.
- 5 April 1968 – Alan Pollock, an RAF pilot, made an unauthorised flight through Tower Bridge in London in protest against the lack of official recognition of the 50th anniversary of the founding of the RAF.
- 22 August 2015 – A Hunter T.7 (G-BXFI (Note: Although a civil aircraft, it was painted as a Royal Air Force aircraft using its former serial number WV372.)) crashed onto the A27 arterial road (dual carriageway) between Lancing and Shoreham-by-Sea, West Sussex, England, while taking part in the 2015 Shoreham Airshow. Eleven people on the ground were killed and several others were injured, including the pilot of the plane. Witnesses told local TV that the jet appeared to have crashed when it failed to pull out of a loop manoeuvre. The UK Air Accidents Investigation Branch (AAIB) concluded that the crash was caused by the pilot completing the top of the loop at too low an altitude and at too low an airspeed. The AAIB concluded that the pilot may have confused the parameters for the Hunter with the BAC Jet Provost he had recently flown, saying, "a possible error path was that the pilot recalled the wrong numbers, essentially mixing up the two aircraft". The pilot was cleared of criminal charges, though the inquest ruled that the victims had been "unlawfully killed".
- 26 July 2025 – A privately owned Hunter traveling from El Paso, Texas, to Oxnard, California, passed within two miles ahead of and within a few hundred feet of altitude of Southwest Airlines Flight 1496, a Boeing 737, causing the passenger jet to climb and descend suddenly and in rapid succession. Southwest 1496 had just left Hollywood Burbank Airport on a flight to Las Vegas, Nevada, when its TCAS alarm sounded and the flight crew descended 475 feet, then climbed 600 feet, in about a minute, while the Hunter reacted by climbing about 100 feet in a few seconds. There were no injuries among the passengers, but two flight attendants were treated for injuries. The passenger jet did not declare an emergency and arrived safely in Las Vegas ahead of schedule.
- 15 October 2025: Hawker Hunter N335AX crashed around 5 nautical miles off Big Sur, California. Pilot ejected and was recovered by a U.S. Navy helicopter.
- 22 September 2026 – A Hunter operated by the Airborne Tactical Advantage Company (ATAC), who provide training & aggressor services for the US Navy & Air Force, lost engine power and went down into the Pacific Ocean. The pilot was recovered by a Navy MH-60 helicopter. The aircraft was formerly operated on the UK airshow circuit under the name "Miss Demeanor", before being acquired by ATAC in 2017.

== Specifications (Hunter F.6) ==
External image
- Cutaway diagram of a Hunter F6, from Flight International's flickr page.

3-view drawing of Hawker Hunter

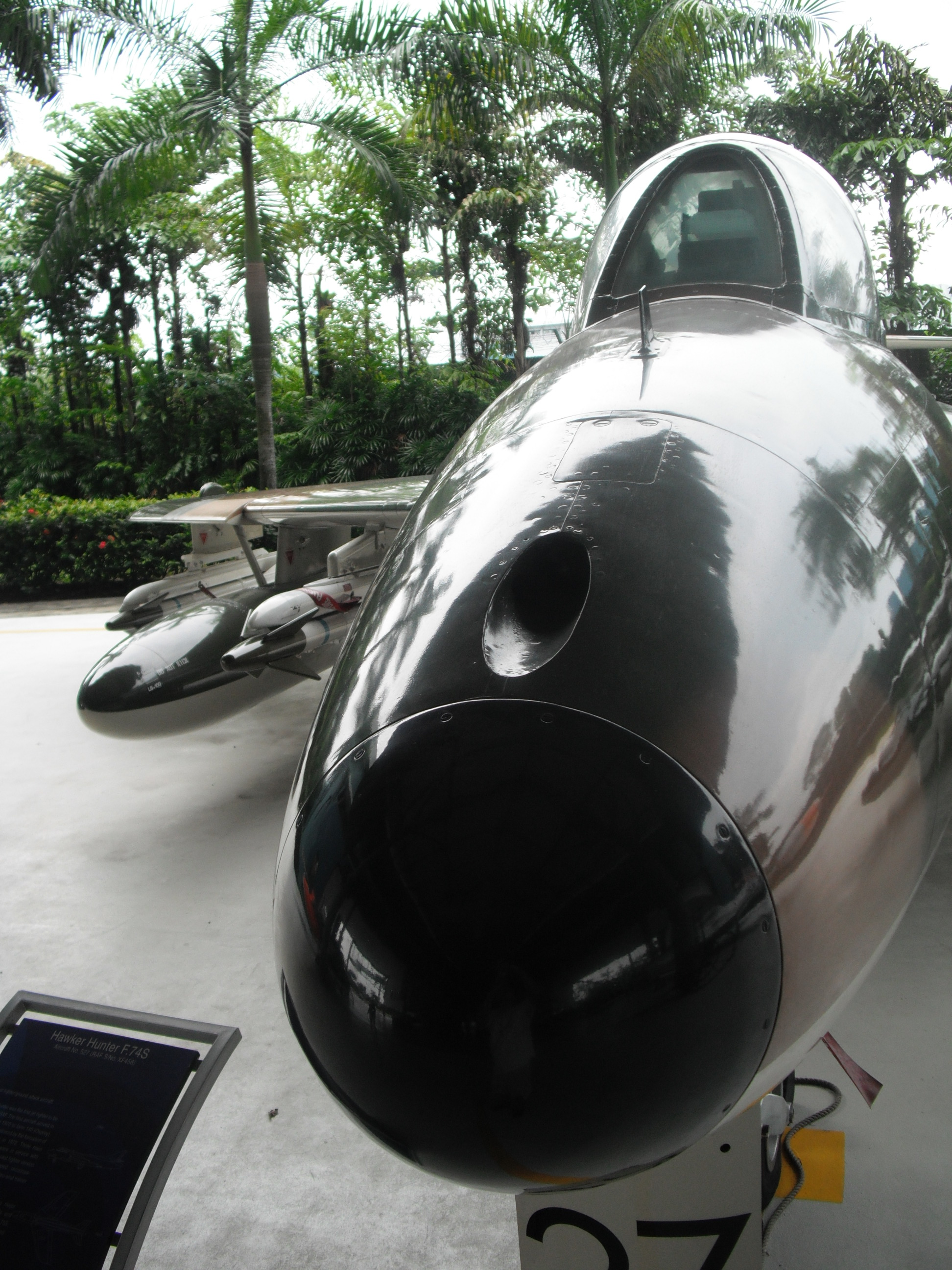
Mounted above the Hunter's nose (ex-RAF XF458) is the G-10 gun camera port. Note also the two Sidewinder missiles under the starboard wing, a total of four could be carried by the Singaporean FGA/FR.74S variant.

Data from The Complete Book of Fighters, The Great Book of Fighters

General characteristics

- Crew: 1
- Length: 45 ft 10.5 in (13.983 m)
- Wingspan: 33 ft 8 in (10.26 m)
- Height: 13 ft 2 in (4.01 m)
- Wing area: 349 sq ft (32.4 m^{2})
- Airfoil: Hawker 8.5% symmetrical
- Empty weight: 14,122 lb (6,406 kg)
- Gross weight: 17,750 lb (8,051 kg)
- Max takeoff weight: 24,600 lb (11,158 kg)
- Powerplant: 1 × Rolls-Royce Avon 207 turbojet engine, 10,145 lbf (45.13 kN) thrust

Performance

- Maximum speed: 623 mph (1,003 km/h, 541 kn) at 36,000 ft (11,000 m)

715 mph (1,151 km/h; 621 kn) at sea level

- Maximum speed: Mach 0.94
- Combat range: 385 mi (620 km, 335 nmi)
- Ferry range: 1,900 mi (3,100 km, 1,700 nmi) maximum external fuel
- Service ceiling: 50,000 ft (15,000 m)
- Rate of climb: 17,200 ft/min (87 m/s)
- Wing loading: 51.6 lb/sq ft (252 kg/m^{2})
- Thrust/weight: 0.56

Armament

- Guns: 4× 30 mm caliber ADEN cannon in a removable gun pack with 150 rpg
- Hardpoints: 4 underwing (7 hardpoints on Singaporean FGA/FR.74S, essentially refurbished FGA.9 derived from F.6) with a capacity of 7,400 lb (3,400 kg), with provisions to carry combinations of:
  - Rockets:
    - 4× Matra rocket pods (each with 18 × SNEB 68 mm (2.68 in) rockets) or
    - 32× Hispano SURA R80 80 mm (3.15 in) rockets
  - Missiles:
    - 4× AIM-9 Sidewinder air-to-air missiles, mounted on Singaporean FGA/FR.74S (two on Swiss Mk 58 Dutch F.6's and Swedish Mk 50)
    - 4× AGM-65 Maverick air-to-surface missiles, mounted on Singaporean FGA/FR.74S (two on Swiss Mk 58)
  - Bombs: a variety of unguided iron bombs
  - Other: 2× 100 imperial gallons (450 L; 120 US gal) drop tanks for extended range/loitering time

Avionics

- Ekco ARI 5820 ranging radar

== See also ==
Aircraft of comparable role, configuration, and era

- CAC Sabre
- Dassault Mystère IV
- Fiat G.91
- Mikoyan-Gurevich MiG-17
- North American F-100 Super Sabre
- Saab 32 Lansen
- Supermarine Type 545
- Sukhoi Su-7
- Vought F-8 Crusader
