= The Arrow (miniseries) =

- Written by: Keith Ross Leckie
- Directed by: Don McBrearty
- Starring: Dan Aykroyd; Sara Botsford; Michael Ironside
- Music by: Christopher Dedrick
- Country of origin: Canada
- Original language: English

Production
- Producers: Aaron Kim Johnston; Eric Jordan; Paul Stephens; Mary Young Leckie
- Cinematography: Rene Ohashi
- Editor: Ralph Brunjes
- Running time: 180 min.
- Production companies: The Film Works; Tapestry Pictures

Original release
- Release: 12 January 1997 – 1997

The Arrow is a four-hour television miniseries produced for CBC Television in 1997, starring Dan Aykroyd as Crawford Gordon, experienced wartime production leader after World War II and president of Avro Canada during its attempt to produce the Avro Arrow supersonic jet interceptor aircraft. The film also stars Michael Ironside and Sara Botsford. The mini-series is noted as having the highest viewership ever for a CBC program.

Other significant individuals in the program, portrayed in the series, include RCAF pilot Flight Lieutenant Jack Woodman (Ron White) who conducted test flights on Avro aircraft but was supplanted by Janusz Żurakowski (Lubomir Mykytiuk) for the first few flights; Jim Chamberlin (Aidan Devine) and James C. Floyd (Nigel Bennett) in the design team; Edward Critchley (Ian D. Clark) who would be asked to develop an engine for the Arrow when other models became unavailable.

== Cast ==
Principal roles as appearing in screen credits (main roles identified):

- Dan Aykroyd as Crawford Gordon Jr.
- Sara Botsford as Kate O'Hara (fictional)
- Ron White as Jack Woodman (pilot)
- Aidan Devine as Jim Chamberlin
- Nigel Bennett as James C. Floyd
- Jonathan Whittaker as Fred Smye
- Ian D. Clark as Edward Critchley
- Dave Brown as Joe Paloffski (fictional)
- Catherine Fitch as Ruby Paloffski (fictional)
- Robin Gammell as C.D. Howe
- Robert Haley as Prime Minister John Diefenbaker
- Michael Moriarty as President Dwight D. Eisenhower
- Michael Ironside as CIA Director (fictional)
- Christopher Plummer as George Hees
- Mauralea Austin as June Callwood
- Art Hindle as Col. Fairchild

== Production ==
Although the miniseries is based on history, it is a work of fiction, employing composite characters and depicting some events that actually did not take place. It acknowledges that there is no hard evidence to support the fictional final scenes, depicting one Arrow that escaped the torches used to tear the other Arrows apart, in accord with allegations attributed to reporter June Callwood. There are errors in illustrations, such as the wing design (the classified design does not appear on the models used, other than on one model the morning after Jim Chamberlin made his modifications); during the "destruct and dispose" operation, an Apollo lunar module is shown in its final configuration, although that design was arrived at by Grumman Aircraft in the later 1960s out of sheer necessity to reduce weight.

Wetaskiwin resident Allan Jackson's efforts to build a full-scale model of the Arrow were discovered during the research phase of pre-production. An offer was made to complete the model and use it in the miniseries. A CBC crew of model makers and set designers completed the full-scale model in time for principal photography that took place in Winnipeg. The production eventually used a combination of archival film, remote-control flying models and computer animation for the static, ground and flying sequences.

=== Arrow model ===
The full-scale Arrow model differs slightly from those built in 1957-59. It was featured throughout the film but the wing structure had a pronounced outer panel dihedral that was "corrected" by CGI work. The wing design was seen on-screen "only" on a wind tunnel model crafted after an "all-nighter" by Chamberlin that was stable at Mach 2.5 and higher.

At the end of film production, Jackson's model was returned but had to be cut into sections in order to fit on the flat-bed trucks used to transport the model to Alberta. After arriving at the Reynolds Alberta Museum in Wetaskawin, Jackson and a team of volunteers reconstructed the model for display at the Abbotsford Air Show in 1997. A wind gust damaged the tail of the model in 1999 leading to its removal from an outside display area of the museum to be repaired indoors at the museum storage facility. Students and instructors from Edmonton's NAIT's Aircraft Structures program have volunteered close to 400 hours restoring the full-scale model to be displayed at the Reynolds-Alberta Museum in 2009 as part of celebrations marking the 100th anniversary of powered flight in Canada and the 50th anniversary of the cancellation of the Avro Arrow. The restored model remains in the museum's storage warehouse along with many other aircraft and cars and can be viewed by purchasing a warehouse tour during the summer months.

== Reception ==
Although highly acclaimed, receiving praise from film historian and former Avro employee Elwy Yost and winner of numerous awards including the Gemini that year, the mini-series was also criticized by critic Michael Bliss for its "docu-drama" style and departing from a strict factual account. The continued rebroadcasts and accompanying DVD releases have served to re-animate the controversy over the Arrow's cancellation and introduce the story to a new generation.

== Post-production ==
Scenes from the mini-series were used to create a Heritage Minute about the Arrow.

== Streaming ==
The miniseries had been released online for free on Canada Media Fund’s Encore+ YouTube channel from 2018 to 2022 but is no longer available on that channel.

== Awards ==
Canadian Society of Cinematographers Awards in 1997

- Rene Ohashi won Best Cinematography in TV Drama

Gemini Awards in 1998

- Aidan Devine won Best Performance by an Actor in a Featured Supporting Role in a Dramatic Program or Mini-Series
- Rene Ohashi won Best Photography in a Dramatic Program or Series
- Tim Bider won Best Production Design or Art Direction in a Dramatic Program or Series
- Michael Baskerville, Jamie Sulek, Dan Sexton, Jonas Kuhnemann, Leon Johnson, & Steve Baine won Best Sound in a Dramatic Program or Series
- John Coldrick, Thomas Turnbull, Joel Skeete, & Doug Hyslip won Best Visual Effects
- Paul Stephens, Eric Jordan, Mary Young Leckie, Jack Clements, & Aaron Kim Johnston won Canada's Choice Award

Motion Picture Sound Editors, USA in 1998

- Michael Baskerville, Dan Sexton, Paul Edwards, Scot Thiessen Gregory and Doug Hubert won the Golden Reel Award for Best Sound Editing - Television Mini-Series - Effects & Foley

Writers Guild of Canada in 1998

- Keith Ross Leckie won the WGC Award
