= Jim Chamberlin =

Canadian aerospace engineer (1915–1981)

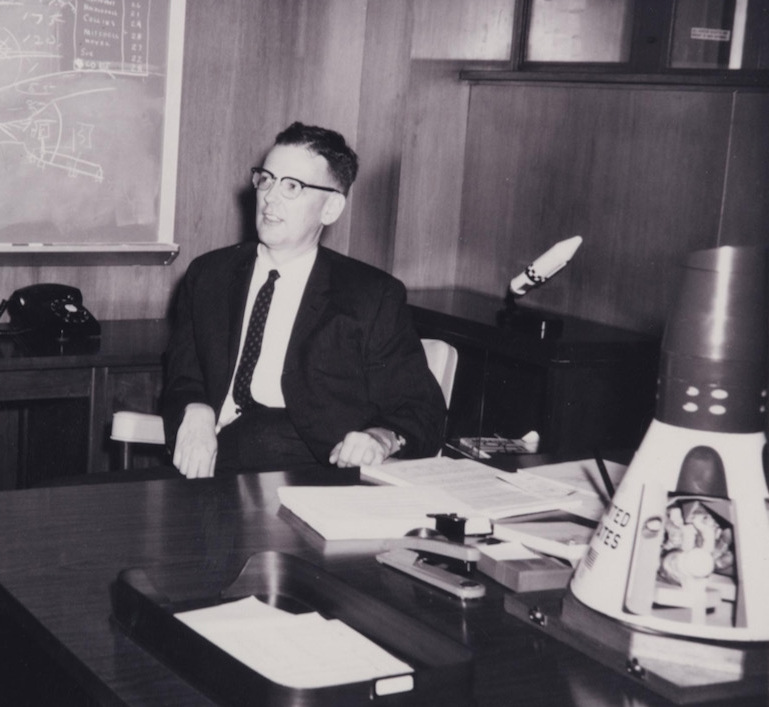
- Chamberlin in the Gemini Project Manager's Office, Houston, 1962
- Born: May 23, 1915; Kamloops, British Columbia, Canada
- Died: March 8, 1981 (aged 65); Webster, Texas, U.S.
- Education: University of Toronto, Imperial College London
- Known for: Avro Arrow, Project Gemini
- Spouse: Ella Chamberlin
- Awards: ESAM; NASA Exceptional Service Medal; NASA Exceptional Engineering Achievement Medal
- Scientific career
- Fields: Aerospace engineering
- Workplaces: Avro Canada; NASA; McDonnell Douglas

James Arthur Chamberlin (May 23, 1915 – March 8, 1981) was a Canadian engineer who contributed to the design of the Canadian Avro Arrow, NASA's Gemini spacecraft and the Apollo program. In addition to his pioneering air and space efforts, he is often cited as an example of Canadian brain drain to the U.S. In the early 1960s, he was one of the key people that proposed and moved that Lunar Orbit Rendezvous (LOR) was the best option for landing a crew on the Moon, the method eventually used on Apollo lunar landing missions. He left NASA in 1970 and worked for McDonnell Douglas, in their Houston offices, until his death in 1981.

== Early life ==
Chamberlin was born in Kamloops, British Columbia on May 23, 1915, the son of Walter A. Chamberlin and Theresa Goldie. His father was an English-born architect, who was killed at the Battle of Vimy Ridge while serving with the Royal Regiment of Canadian Artillery. His mother, a sister of William Goldie, moved to Toronto following her husband's death and was later remarried. Chamberlin subsequently attended high school at the University of Toronto Schools. Having maintained a keen interest in aircraft from a young age, he built original design model airplanes in his adolescent years, at one point winning a model aircraft contest organized by The Mail and Empire. Chamberlin later took mechanical engineering degrees at the University of Toronto (1936) and Imperial College London (1939).

== Career ==
Chamberlin began his engineering career with the British aircraft company (and later ejection seat manufacturers) Martin-Baker before returning to Canada. He worked on the production of the British Avro Anson at Federal Aircraft Ltd. in Montreal (1940–1941), and later, on training and anti-submarine aircraft as chief engineer at Clarke Ruse Aircraft in Dartmouth, Nova Scotia (1941–1942). His longest tenure began as a research engineer (1942–1945) at Noorduyn Aircraft in Montreal, working on the Norseman and serving in this position until the end of the Second World War.

=== Avro Canada ===
In February 1946, Chamberlin joined Avro Aircraft Ltd. in Toronto, the Canadian subsidiary of the British Avro, itself part of the Hawker Siddeley Group, where he was chief aerodynamicist on the C102 Jetliner and CF-100 Canuck jet interceptor. Later, as chief of technical design for the CF-105 Avro Arrow jet interceptor, he generated many of the ideas that would make the design famous. According to Canada's Aviation Hall of Fame, it was under Chamberlin's leadership that the Arrow's technical design team conducted engineering research and applied development techniques that were "a generation or more ahead of those used by other aircraft companies" at the time.

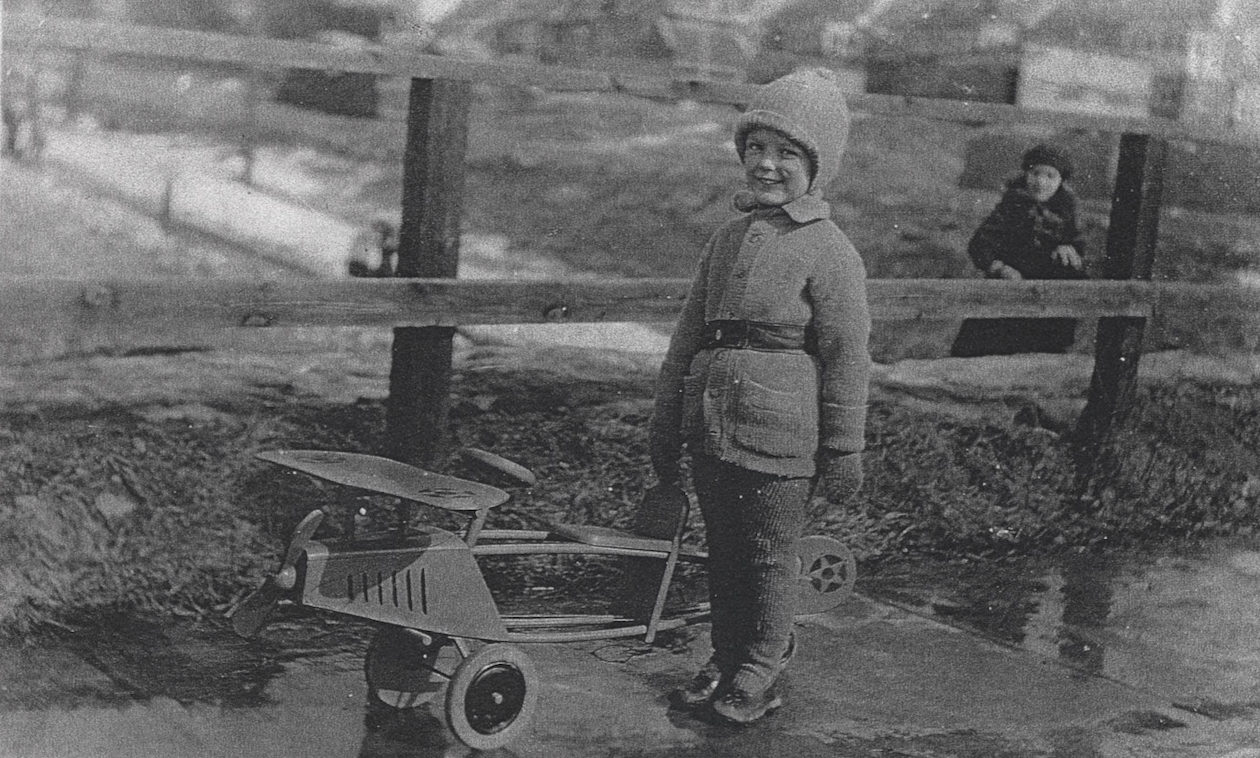
Chamberlin as a boy in Vernon, British Columbia with a pedal car airplane

=== NASA ===
Following the Canadian government's cancellation of the Avro Arrow project in 1959, Chamberlin led a team of 25 engineers from Avro who joined NASA's Space Task Group. This group eventually grew to 32 former Avro engineers, collectively known as the "Avro Group", who joined NASA and become emblematic of what many Canadians viewed as a brain drain to the United States.

As head of engineering for Project Mercury, chief designer and NASA's first Project Manager for the Gemini spacecraft built by McDonnell Aircraft, and then troubleshooter on Apollo, Chamberlin played an instrumental role in creating and implementing the first three generations of American crewed spacecraft.

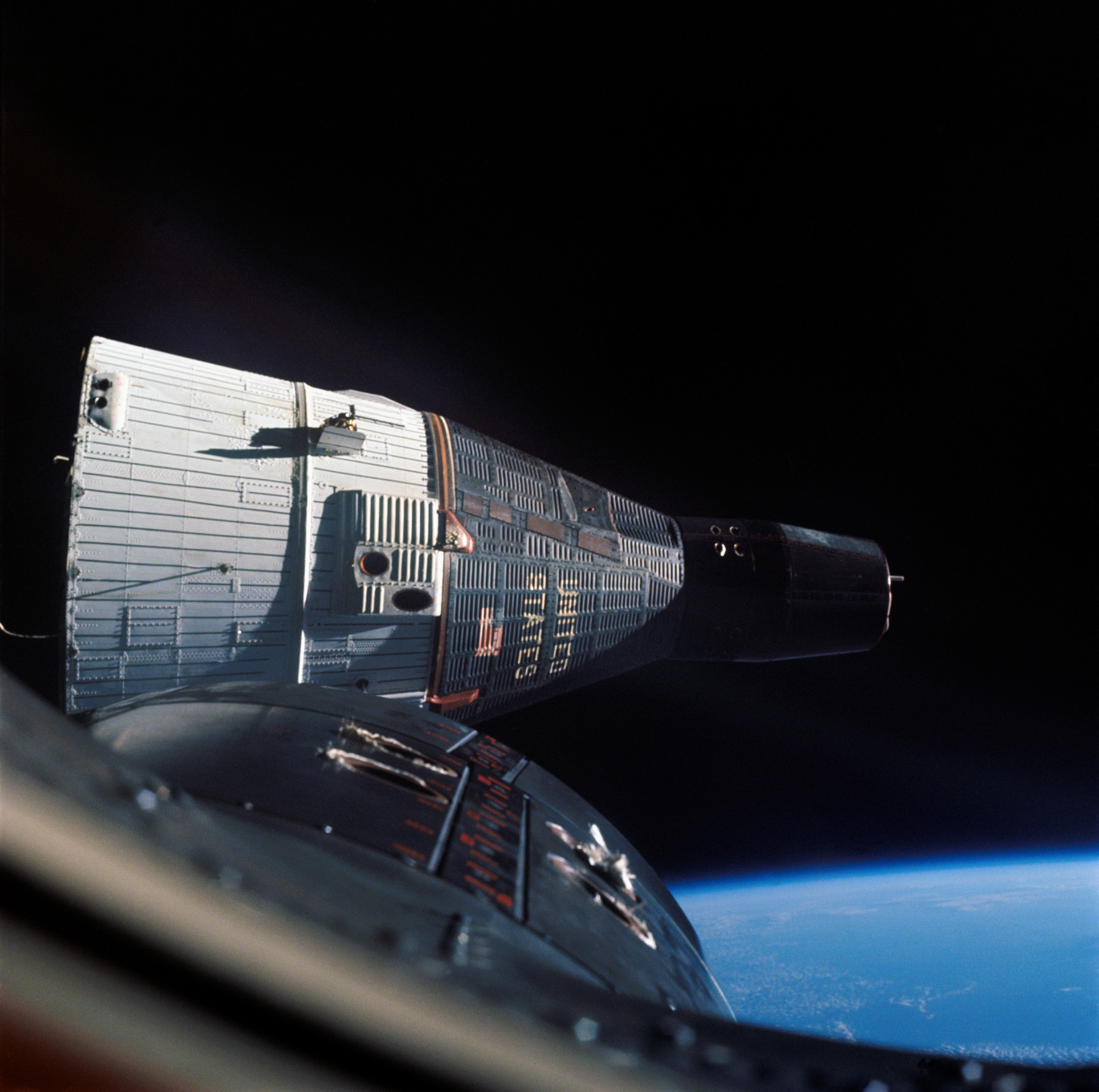
Chamberlin was chiefly responsible for designing the Gemini spacecraft and was the first Project Manager for Gemini (Gemini 7 shown in a photo from Gemini 6 on December 15, 1965).

While designing the Gemini spacecraft in 1961, Chamberlin proposed that Gemini be paired with a "bug" that would land a single astronaut on the Moon. Chamberlin had been impressed with NASA engineer John Houbolt's advocacy of Lunar orbit rendezvous as the method to go to the Moon. Although Chamberlin's idea of flying Gemini to the Moon was rejected, it helped lead NASA to its decision in 1962 to use Lunar Orbit Rendezvous in the Apollo program, which involved using the Lunar Module (LM) to descend to the lunar surface.

Chamberlin was described by space historian David Baker as "probably one of the most brilliant men ever to work for NASA." Chamberlin left NASA in 1970 to join McDonnell Douglas Astronautics, where he prepared an ultimately unsuccessful space shuttle bid before becoming technical director for the company's facility at the Johnson Space Center in Houston, a position he held until his death on March 8, 1981. He and his wife had a son and a daughter.

== Honors ==
NASA awarded Chamberlin its Exceptional Scientific Achievement, Exceptional Service and Exceptional Engineering Achievement medals. Chamberlin was a Professional Engineer of the Province of Ontario, a member of the Institute of Aeronautical Scientists and an Associate Fellow of the Canadian Aeronautical Institute. The minor planet 14148 Jimchamberlin, discovered at Kitt Peak National Observatory in 1998, is named in his honor. In 2001, he was inducted into Canada's Aviation Hall of Fame. In 2019, Canada Post issued stamps commemorating Canadian contributions to the Apollo 11 mission which included Chamberlin's likeness.

In the 1997 CBC miniseries The Arrow, Chamberlin is played by actor Aidan Devine.
