= Avro Canada C102 Jetliner =

Canadian prototype jet airliner built by Avro Canada

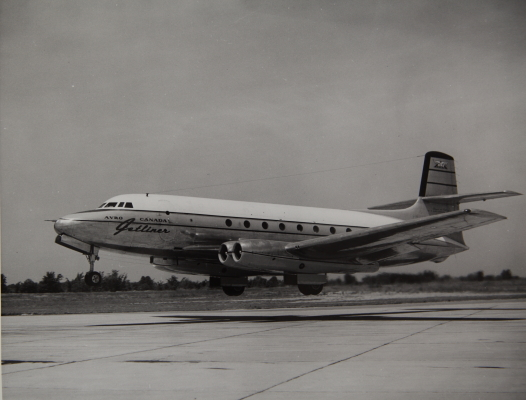

General information
- Type: Jet airliner
- National origin: Canada
- Manufacturer: Avro Canada
- Primary user: Trans Canada Airlines (intended)
- Number built: One (second prototype cancelled whilst in production and scrapped)

History
- First flight: 10 August 1949

The Avro Canada C102 Jetliner was a Canadian prototype medium-range turbojet-powered jet airliner designed and built by Avro Canada. Its name, "Jetliner", was chosen as a shortening of the term "jet airliner", a term which is still in popular usage for jet-powered passenger aircraft.

The origins of the Jetliner can be traced back to Rolls-Royce's development of the Rolls-Royce Avon (an early turbojet engine) and interest at Trans-Canada Airlines (TCA) in the operation of a jet-powered airliner. During April 1946, a requirement for a twin-engined airliner, capable of seating at least 36 passengers and a range of 1,200 miles (1,900 km), was finalised. Avro Canada commenced work under a fixed-price contract that, unusually, included a three-year period in which the manufacturer was not allowed to sell the Jetliner to any other airline except for TCA. TCA pulled out of the project in 1947 after the contract's feasibility was called into question; support from the Canadian politician and engineer C. D. Howe was quickly forthcoming. Due to availability concerns with the Avon engine, it was decided to adopt four Rolls-Royce Derwents instead. In addition to the civil market, models of the Jetliner were proposed for military roles, including as a crew trainer, photo reconnaissance, cargo, and paratroop platform.

On 10 August 1949, the Jetliner performed its maiden flight; it was beaten to the air by only 13 days by the British airliner de Havilland Comet, thereby becoming the second purpose-built jet-powered airliner in the world, while both were preceded by the Nene Lancastrian, and the Nene Viking, both of which were conversions of piston engine airliners. The aircraft was considered suitable for busy routes along the US eastern seaboard and garnered intense interest, notably from Howard Hughes who even offered to start production under licence. Furthermore, it drew attention from at least six airlines as well as both the United States Air Force and United States Navy as potential operators. At one point, the Jetliner was scheduled to enter service in October 1952. However, continued delays in Avro Canada's all-weather interceptor project, the CF-100 Canuck, contributed to a 1951 order from C.D. Howe for the company to discontinue all work on the project. Despite this, flights of the sole completed prototype Jetliner continued until December 1956, shortly after which it was cut up for scrap.

== Design and development ==
=== Background and early work ===
In 1945, Trans-Canada Airlines (TCA) started exploring a number of aircraft developments under the direction of Jim Bain, at that time superintendent of engineering and maintenance. Avro of England, which had recently taken over the Victory Aircraft "shadow factory" in Toronto, jointly with TCA, came up with a layout for an aircraft powered by four Armstrong-Siddeley turboprop engines later known as the Armstrong Siddeley Mamba. This Mamba engine arrangement was used about the same time for the British Armstrong Whitworth Apollo airliner. In the fall of 1945, Bain travelled to England to visit various aircraft companies and Rolls-Royce, where Ernest Hives, head of the Rolls-Royce Aero Engine, convinced Bain that the AJ65, a new axial-flow turbojet engine later called the Avon, was the right engine for his new aircraft. On his return to Canada, Bain insisted a twin-engined aircraft powered by these engines was the only arrangement acceptable to TCA.

Over the next few months, the teams at TCA and Avro refined the requirements, which were signed off on 9 April 1946. They called for a 36-seat aircraft with a cruising speed of 425 miles per hour (684 km/h), a range of 1,200 miles (1,900 km), an average distance between stops of 250 miles (400 km) and a longest single flight of 500 mi (800 km). The difference between the range and maximum airport distances was to allow for the required 45 minutes stacking and diversion to a 120-mile (190-km)-distant alternate airport in a 20 mph (32 km/h) headwind. The aircraft also needed to be able to operate from existing 4,000 ft (1,200 m) runways. Load was 12,700 lbs and 50 passengers.

The agreement also specified a number of contractual terms that, in retrospect, appear especially unorthodox. In spite of TCA's experience with contracting for the Ministry of Transport, and Bain's personal arguments that cost-plus contracts be used as a ward against budget overruns, TCA's contract with Avro demanded fixed prices for the entire development, as well as a fixed price for the aircraft of C$350,000. Additionally, Avro was not allowed to sell the aircraft to any other airline for three years. After that period, if a buyer paid less than C$350,000 for the aircraft, Avro would have to pay the difference to TCA. Furthermore, during the testing period of one year after the first aircraft was introduced, Avro would have to pay all costs, even if paying passengers were carried. Jack Dyment, chief of TCA's entire engineering department, suggested that Avro pay for the testing so that it would "permit us to learn how to successfully operate a jet aircraft without having to pay for such experience the hard way."

=== Design changes ===
In 1947, Fred Smye, president of Avro, advised Herbert James Symington of TCA that they could not meet the fixed price contract. Symington's response was to pull out of the project. C. D. Howe stepped in and offered $1.5 million to continue the project, at a slower pace. At about the same time, Rolls-Royce informed Avro that the civil certification of the Avon could not be guaranteed in time for the Jetliner's rollout. This, in turn, would lead to higher operational and maintenance costs. Nevertheless, Avro continued with its plan to build the jet, selecting four Rolls-Royce Derwents to replace the two Avons. Chief Designer James C. Floyd was upset by these developments, but also recognised a number of advantages to the four-engine layout. One major advantage was that in an engine-out situation, the aircraft would lose only a quarter of its thrust, rather than half. In particular, the asymmetry in thrust originally called for a powered rudder to correct for yaw in the case of an engine failure, but with four engines it was found yaw was so small it could be corrected easily with just the manual trim controls. Furthermore, the four engine configuration generated more thrust overall, however, it also incurred a 13 percent increase in fuel consumption.

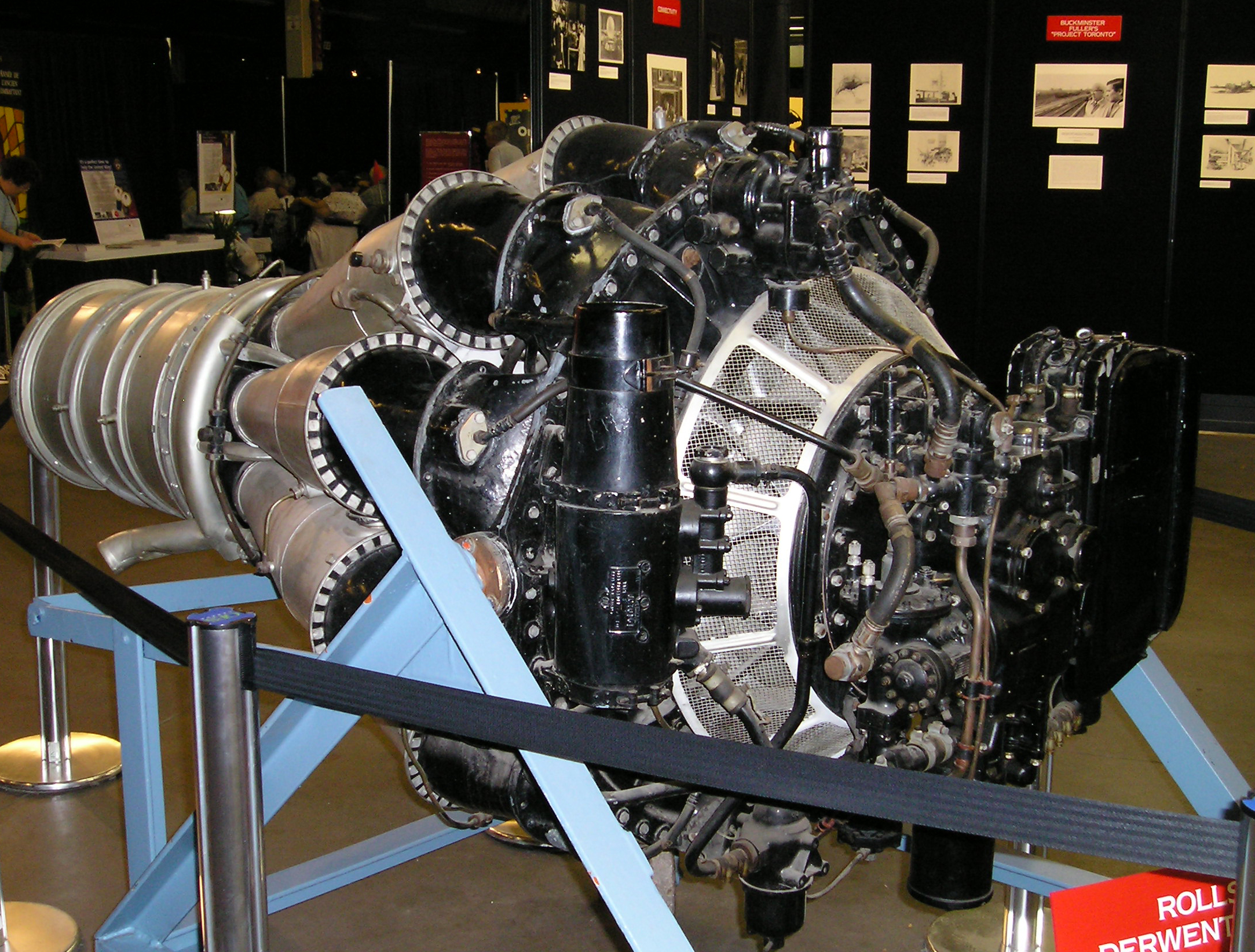
Rolls-Royce Derwent engine, used in the Avro Jetliner

Although bearing some resemblance to the jet-powered Avro Tudor 8 and 9 (the former flying on jet power in 1948 and the latter becoming the experimental Avro Ashton first flying in 1950), Floyd's design was conceived from the outset as a commercial jet airliner. Numerous elements of the design, such as the fuselage frames, engines, and landing gear, were to be at least initially fabricated in the United Kingdom; company officials publicly stated that quantity production of the Jetliner was intended to be primarily dependent upon a Canadian-centric supply chain. Throughout the late 1940s, the design team comprised less than 80 personnel in total.

The updated design was presented in October 1948, and in February 1948 TCA responded with changes of their own. Specifically, they wanted the aircraft to cruise at 500 mph (800 km/h), and also increased the fuel requirements to allow for wider diversions. It was believed that to achieve these new performance requirements, the adoption of a swept wing would have been necessary, which in turn would have involved an extensive redesign of the whole aircraft. In April 1948, Gordon McGregor took over the presidency of TCA, and told Smye that he did not want it to be the first airline with a jet. In spite of TCA's increasing reluctance, Avro pressed on with the project, reorienting towards other potential customers abroad, particularly with the United States. On 1 November 1948, the Jetliner was the topic of a major article in Aviation Week; by this point, the aircraft was reportedly scheduled to begin deliveries in May 1952, and enter service in October, which would have given it a full six years headstart on the 707, which did not enter service until October 1958, and more than 11 years on its top short-field competitor, the Boeing 727. Its short-field performance exceeded that of the Sud Aviation Caravelle (while carrying a comparable number of passengers).

Proposals exist for 30-, 40-, and 50-seat models, as well as 52- and 64-seat paratroop versions, high-altitude medical lab, photo reconnaissance, cargo, and crew trainer types. Both the United States Air Force and United States Navy were viewed as prospective operators of the militarised type. The USAF was interested in the Jetliner, inviting Avro's team to Wright Field in Dayton, Ohio, to discuss the type's potential for crew training. Possessing both a relatively high speed and cruise altitude, the Jetliner was considered to be comparable to the service's new strategic bombers; at one point, the USAF had reportedly allocated funds for the purchase of 20 Jetliners that it intended to train both pilots and bombardiers upon. Furthermore, it was even suggested that the aircraft could be adapted into an aerial refuelling tanker.

== Operational history ==
=== Flight testing ===
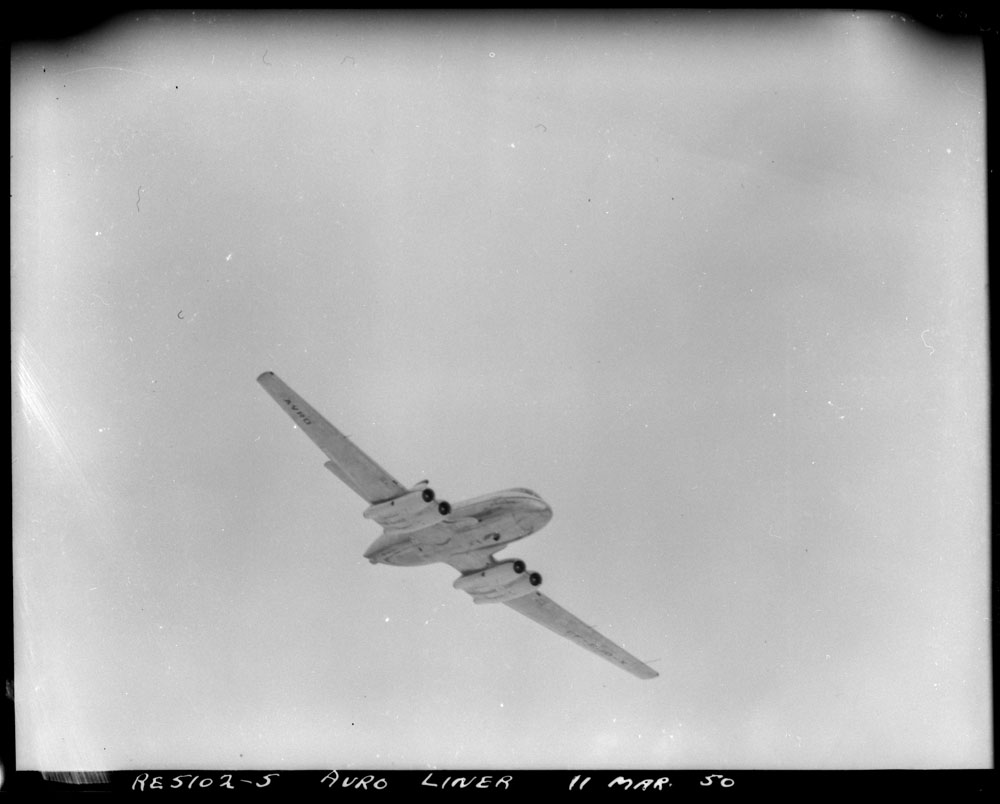
Avro Canada Jetliner in flight, 11 March 1950

During the first half of 1949, taxiing trails commenced using the first prototype, CF-EJD (-X). Numerous burst tires were experienced during the high-speed taxi trials, which included braking tests and steering control checks; this was attributed to the intended anti-skid braking system having not yet been fitted. Additionally, these high speed runs had to be performed on a shorter runway than had been planned as the Department of Transport had taken the longer runway out of service for rework at the last minute. Regardless, this caused delays to the type's maiden flight, which took place on 10 August 1949, only 25 months after work on the design had started, and only 13 days after the first flight of the de Havilland Comet. On its second flight, on 16 August, the landing gear failed to extend, necessitating the Jetliner to perform a belly landing. However, the damage incurred was relatively minor, permitting the aircraft to return to the air only three weeks later. Despite this incident, the rest of the flight testing programme proceeded relatively smoothly.

During the prototype's first inspection in November 1949, the servo rudder was removed after having been deemed to be unnecessary, however, the servo elevators were retained for handling with extreme centre-of-gravity positions. Around this time, Delos W. Rentzel of the United States Aeronautics Administration publicly declared that the American market was keen to accommodate the Jetliner.

On 18 April 1950, the Jetliner carried the world's first jet airmail 365 miles (587 km) from Malton Airport in Toronto, to New York City's Idlewild Airport in fifty-nine minutes and fifty-six seconds–half that of commercial flights. The flight was highly publicized and the crew was greeted by a group of officials and a crowd of several hundred onlookers. So new was the concept of jet power that the Jetliner was made to park far from the terminal, and pans were placed under the engines in case they dripped any "self-igniting fuel." On the next day, the Jetliner returned to Toronto via Montreal.

The US-based National Airlines held discussions with Avro towards the prospective purchasing of four Jetliners with an option for six more aircraft. In response to this interest, the second prototype Jetliner was intended to incorporate National's requirements. Specifically, changed included the adoption of an elongated fuselage that could accommodate up to 60 passengers, the fitting of double-slotted flaps, increased range, and provision for the installation of various models of engine.

=== Cancellation, prospective revival and final grounding ===
During the early 1950s, Avro came under competing pressures from Canadian authorities, who were keen to expand and improve the nation's military capabilities as what would become known as the Cold War was in its early stages. Specifically, Avro working on the development of the Avro Canada CF-100 Canuck, the first dedicated jet-powered, all-weather fighter, for the Royal Canadian Air Force (RCAF). During mid 1951, the CF-100 programme was placed on indefinite hold following the loss of the second prototype, and senior politicians expressed their concerns over the project and Avro's endeavours. Seeking to increase the pace of the CF-100's development, Cabinet Minister C. D. Howe instructed Avro to suspend work on its other projects, including the Jetliner, to focus its resources on completing work on the CF-100. Although the Jetliner had garnered considerable public attention, this had not immediately translated into orders. Amid the project's unestablished sales prospects, C.D. Howe ordered the program's termination in December 1951. The second prototype Jetliner, nearly completed in the main assembly hangar, was broken up at that time.

Nevertheless, only a few months later, the enigmatic Howard Hughes first learned of the design and leased the Jetliner prototype for testing, flying it for a few circuits when it arrived in Culver City, California. Hughes tried to buy 30 Jetliners for use by TWA, but Avro had to repeatedly turn him down due to limited manufacturing capabilities and overwork on the CF-100 project. Hughes then started looking at US companies to build it for him; Convair was particularly interested, going as far to conduct studies on establishing its own production line for the type. It has been alleged that C.D. Howe intervened in the prospective deal, obstructing it so that Avro would concentrate on its Orenda turbojet and CF-100 jet fighter programs. Furthermore, the U.S. government decided that Convair's military commitments had priority for facilities over any additional civil projects.

During 1953, the Jetliner project was almost restarted, at which point the CF-100 had achieved quantity production, but this never solidified. In 1955, TCA ordered 51 Vickers Viscount turboprop aircraft from the British-based aircraft manufacturer Vickers-Armstrong; these became the first turbine-powered aircraft in regular service in North America. They continued in service until 1974.

The Jetliner was later used for taking in-flight photographs of CF-100 development trials such as canopy jettison and rocket firing. On 10 December 1956, the Jetliner was grounded and ordered not to fly again. It was donated to the National Research Council but they had no room to store it and took only the nose section for cockpit layout design. The rest of the Jetliner was quietly cut up on 13 December 1956 and sold to a scrap merchant in Ontario. The only surviving parts are the nose and cockpit section in the Canada Aviation and Space Museum in Ottawa, Ontario.

=== Legacy ===
Canada Post issued a stamp to commemorate the development of the Jetliner. Jetliner Road in Mississauga, Ontario is named for the airliner at Toronto Pearson International Airport. The "Avro Jetliner Private" street name also commemorates the aircraft at Ottawa Macdonald–Cartier International Airport.

== Specifications Avro C102 Jetliner ==
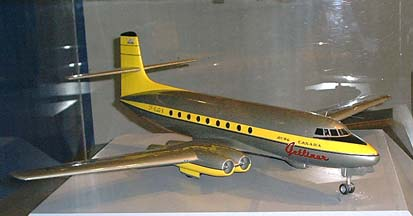
Model of the C102

Data from Avro Aircraft since 1908

General characteristics

- Capacity: payload 12,700 lb (5,761 kg)
- Length: 82 ft 5 in (25.12 m)
- Wingspan: 98 ft 1 in (29.90 m)
- Wing area: 1,097 sq ft (101.9 m^{2})
- Airfoil: root: NACA 23016.5; tip: NACA 23012
- Empty weight: 27,427 lb (12,441 kg)
- Gross weight: 55,000 lb (24,948 kg)
- Powerplant: 4 × Rolls-Royce Derwent V centrifugal-flow turbojet engines, 3,600 lbf (16 kN) thrust each (later fitted with 2x Derwent 8 {#2 & #4} and 2x Derwent 9 engines {#1 & #3})

Performance

- Maximum speed: 417 mph (671 km/h, 362 kn) at 30,000 ft (9,100 m)
- Cruise speed: 376 mph (605 km/h, 327 kn) at 30,000 ft (9,100 m)
- Range: 1,680 mi (2,700 km, 1,460 nmi)
- Service ceiling: 40,300 ft (12,300 m)
- Rate of climb: 2,220 ft/min (11.3 m/s)
- Wing loading: 51.86 lb/sq ft (253.2 kg/m^{2})

== See also ==
- Vickers VC.1 Viking – Nene Viking

Aircraft of comparable role, configuration, and era

- Avro Ashton
- Baade 152
- de Havilland Comet

Related lists

- list of jet airliners
