= Crawford Gordon Jr. =

Canadian businessman (1914–1967)

- Born: 26 December 1914; Winnipeg, Manitoba
- Died: 26 January 1967 (aged 52); New York City
- Education: Appleby College ('31); McGill University (BCom '36)
- Spouse: Mary Marjorie Tearney (m. 1937)

Crawford Gordon Jr. (26 December 1914 – 26 January 1967) was a leader of wartime defence production in Canada under Minister of Munitions and Supply C.D. Howe during the Second World War. He was perhaps one of the greatest industrialists and business minds in Canadian history; Gordon bought two companies and held one CEO position, but eventually lost it all.

== Early years ==
Gordon was born in Winnipeg in 1914. He was the first child of Crawford Gordon Sr. and Ethel Flora Fortune, the latter of whom had survived the sinking of the RMS Titanic in 1912.

== Second World War ==
Gordon was one of C. D. Howe's "boys", or "dollar-a-year men" during the Second World War, helping the government organize industrial resources to meet the needs of wartime production and resource management.

== Avro Canada ==
In October 1951, Howe arranged for Gordon, now with the Department of Defense Production, to take over as president and general manager of A. V. Roe Canada ("Avro Canada"), a subsidiary of A.V. Roe and Company of the U.K., to assist with problems in development and production of the CF-100 Canuck fighter interceptor. Under Gordon's encouragement to Avro's designers, Avro offered to design and build the new supersonic jet interceptor identified by the Canadian Chiefs of Staff as needed to counter a Soviet Union bomber threat. In 1953 the government commenced funding of a study for what would first be the design for the C104 delta-wing aircraft, and eventually the CF-105 Arrow.

During Crawford's tenure in the 1950s, A.V. Roe Canada was restructured into two separate divisions: Avro Aircraft Ltd. and Orenda Engines, both based at Malton Airport. The total labour force of both aviation companies reached 15,000 in 1958. During the same period, A.V. Roe Canada also purchased a number of companies, including Dominion Steel and Coal Corporation, Canada Car and Foundry (1957) and Canadian Steel Improvement Ltd. By 1958, A. V. Roe Canada was an industrial giant with over 50,000 employees in a far-flung empire of 44 companies involved in coal mining, steel making, railway rolling stock, aircraft and aero-engine manufacturing, as well as computers and electronics. The companies generated annual sales in the $450 million range, ranking A.V. Roe Canada as the third largest corporation in Canada.

=== The Avro Arrow ===
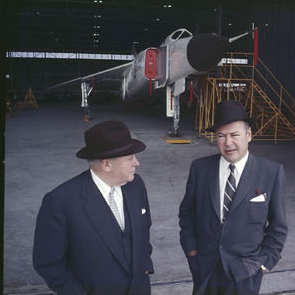
(L–R) Sir Roy Dobson and Crawford Gordon Jr. Note: Avro Arrow in background, c. 1957.

Gordon continued to ask for further funding as the interceptor program for the CF-105 Arrow proceeded, particularly as the program scope expanded to include the new Orenda Iroquois advanced turbojet engine, when other manufacturers' engine designs were dropped or proved inadequate. When the Liberal government in which Howe served was defeated, Gordon had to deal with the new Progressive Conservative government of John Diefenbaker, a government that viewed such ambitious, costly projects with skepticism.

Gordon may have clashed with the Diefenbaker government due to a number of pressures, including the unexpected delays in getting the Avro Arrow into production, and the threat to the Arrow from the rise of the missile (it was designed to intercept manned bombers). There may have also been a clash of personalities: during the only meeting between the two, Gordon was described as "drunken, rude" and "puffed (cigarette) smoke in the old man's face". Gordon was a heavy drinker and Diefenbaker a teetotaler and non-smoker.

== Final years ==
Gordon's battles and gambles finally lost out when the Arrow program was canceled on 20 February 1959. Gordon was fired as A.V. Roe Canada president not long after the Arrow cancellation. Gordon's life was on a downward spiral afterward.

By the summer of 1966, his net worth of $3 million had mostly evaporated. After a long battle with alcoholism, Crawford Gordon died in New York City on 26 January 1967 of liver failure. Friends said he drank himself to his death; he could handle success, but not failure.

Dan Aykroyd appearing as Crawford Gordon in the CBC mini-series, The Arrow (1996).

== Crawford Gordon in popular culture ==
Crawford Gordon was portrayed, with a good visible likeness, by Dan Aykroyd in the 1997 mini-seriesThe Arrow. His secretary, Audrey Underwood (given the name Claire in the CBC mini-series), left AVRO Canada for New York to escape from her relationship with Crawford, who had refused to divorce his wife. Crawford pursued her to New York in an attempt to win back her love (as verified by Arrow Expert Greig Stewart and by the Underwood family). Underwood was the daughter of Canadian Unarmed Combat and Self-Defence legend Bill Underwood, who created the first Unarmed Combat system for the Canadian Forces in WW2, known as COMBATO (documented by the Canadian Forces). Crawford's drinking problems and depression then served to exacerbate his distrust of the Diefenbaker government into outright abuse. That abuse did not help with the government's disdain for the Arrow program while it was under budget pressure to make just one choice for aeronautic defense of Canadian airspace.
