= Jack Bickell =

Canadian businessman, philanthropist, and sports team owner

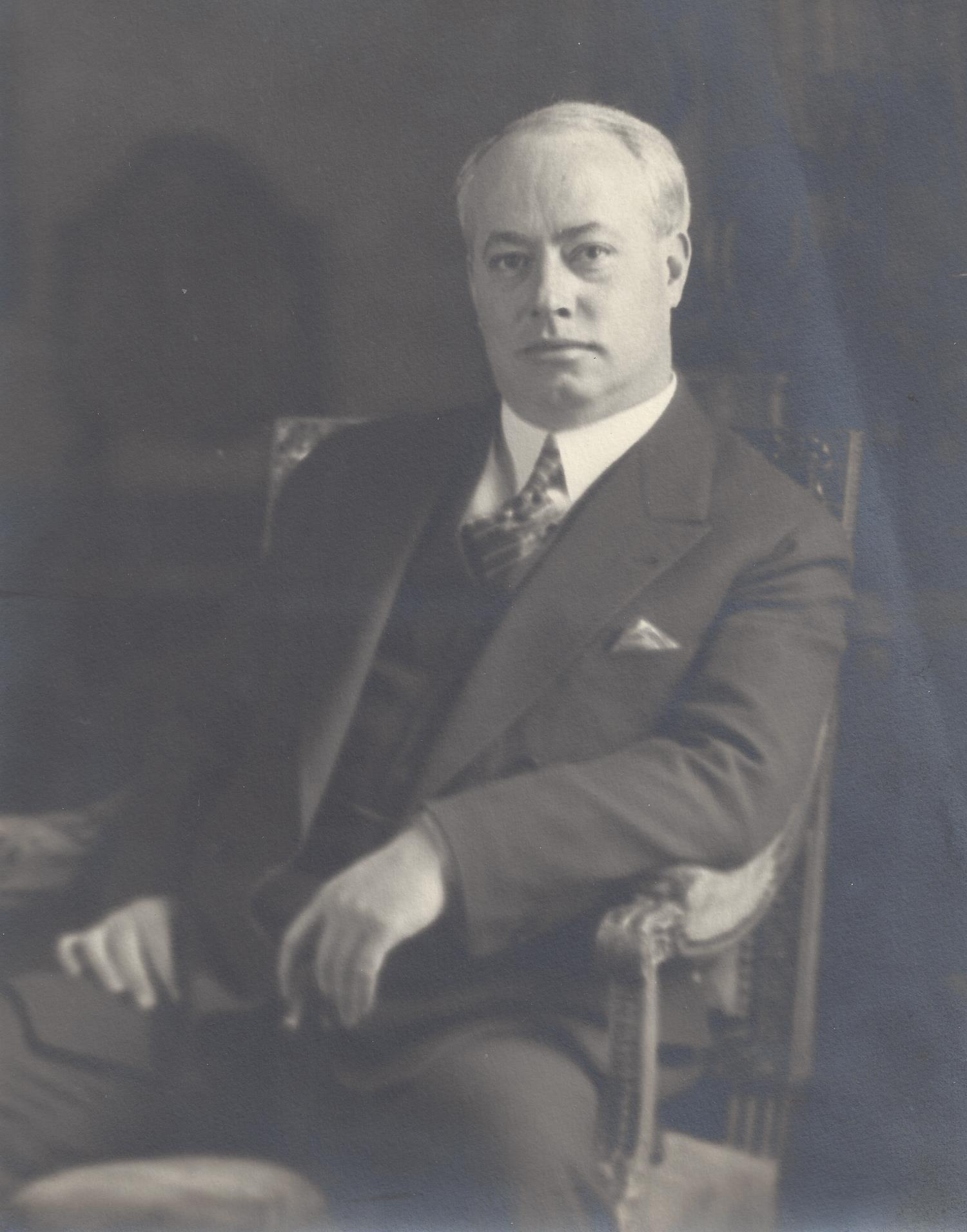
- Born: John Paris Bickell; September 26, 1884; Molesworth, Ontario, Canada
- Died: August 22, 1951 (aged 66); New York City, U.S.
- Occupations: Businessman, philanthropist, and sports team owner

John Paris Bickell (September 26, 1884 – August 22, 1951) was a Canadian businessman, philanthropist, and sports team owner. He is best known for his long-time association with the Toronto Maple Leafs professional ice hockey team as the owner, president, chairman and director 1924–1951.

== Early life ==
Bickell's parents were Rev. David Bickell and Annie Paris, who was a teacher. Born in Molesworth, near Listowel, and raised in Toronto, Bickell was their second child of four. His father died when he was six years old; his younger brother died when John was eight years old; and his older brother died in 1898 when John was 12 years old.

Bickell attended St. Andrew's College, where he was one of the first 100 graduates.

== Brokerage interests ==
Bickell started his own brokerage firm, J. P. Bickell & Co., at the age of 23 and was a millionaire by 30. He sold his firm in 1919 to concentrate on his various movie and mining interests. His hiatus from the industry did not last long as on April 15, 1926, he was a senior partner in the New York brokerage firm of Thomson McKinnon. He left the firm in to take on his WWII responsibilities in late 1939.

== Movie interests ==
Bickell was a key player in the development of the movie industry in Canada. He served as president of both Eastern Theatres Limited and Hamilton United Theatres Limited. Eastern Theatres oversaw the construction of Toronto's Pantages Theatre, which specialized in the era's vaudeville acts. Similarly, Bickell also served as vice-president of the Select Pictures Corporation, a Canadian distribution company, and was also part of the team that acquired Montreal's Théâtre St-Denis in October 1917. Bickell was vice-president of the Regent Theatre Company, one of Toronto's first large movie theatres which stood on Adelaide between Yonge and Bay Streets. The theatre's company was formed in 1916 by a group of Toronto financiers including; P. W. Cushman, E. L. Ruddy, W. J. Sheppard, J. B. Tudhope and, of course, Bickell. Anticipating the ever-increasing interest in moving pictures, the company sought to acquire and transform J. Ambrose Small's theatre, The Majestic, into a deluxe movie theatre. In 1920 Famous Players Canadian Corporation Limited was founded in Bickell's office and he served as the vice president with Nathan Nathanson as managing director. Bickell's friend W.D. Ross, head of the Bank of Nova Scotia and later Lieutenant-Governor of Ontario, Izaak Walton Killam of Royal Securities, Sir Herbert Samuel Holt of the Royal Bank, and Bickell, were all members of the board of directors that underwrote the necessary CA$4 million of the company's initial share offerings. He ultimately sold out his interests in the movie industry in 1930 to the president of the corporation, Adolph Zukor of New York. Bickell then concentrated on his mining interests.

== Mining interests ==
Bickell's initial involvement in mining was in the early 1900s in Cobalt, Ontario. In 1911 he invested in McIntyre Porcupine Mines Ltd. in Schumacher, Ontario. He became the president and later chairman, a position he held until his death. His work in mining earned him a place in the Canadian Mining Hall of Fame.

McIntyre Mine was formed in 1911, adding land staked by Sandy McIntyre to nearby ground obtained by Bickell. The initial assays were lean, but Bickell kept the faith and the company afloat through these tough times. Later, as grades improved, he obtained additional ground. The result was the McIntyre Porcupine Mine Limited, which has earned a place in Canadian mining history as one of the nation's most important mines. Between 1912 and 1955, total production was valued at $230 million, and the company paid $62 million in dividends to shareholders. McIntyre also controlled the Belleterre gold mine in Quebec and the Castle-Trethewey silver mine near Gowganda, Ontario.

== Involvement in sports ==
=== Boxing ===
In 1919, Bickell's sponsorship of boxing was with a belt that he put forth for Canada's featherweight champion, known as the Bickell Belt.

- Boat racing - In 1920, Bickell was associated with the Toronto Syndicate, a group that built and sponsored racing boats in both Canada and the United States, including the hydroplanes Miss Toronto I and Miss Toronto II. Not surprisingly, the syndicate included some heavy hitters in the financial world, including; Bickell's friend Alfred Rogers, the coal and cement baron, as well as: F. Ericson, Thomas Rea, S.A. Sylvester, Fred Miller, Cecil Allison, W.B. Cleland, and others. The Syndicate made several entries into various high-profile races on both sides of the U.S.-Canada border. At the Thousand Island Gold Cup in Alexandria Bay, New York, Miss Toronto II, with Bickell and Ericson at the helm, represented the Toronto Motor Boat Club: Miss Toronto II logged the fastest five miles ever recorded in competition up until that point. In doing a five-mile lap in five minutes flat, Miss Toronto II set a new North American record, and she was dubbed "the mile-a-minute boat".

=== Hockey ===
In 1924, Jack came into the hockey business when Charlie Querrie needed to financially reorganize his hockey team in Toronto called the Toronto St. Patricks. They had previously won a Stanley Cup in 1922. Bickell initially invested in the St. Pats in 1924 as a favor to his friend Charlie Querrie. When Querrie needed to sell the team in 1927, Bickell arranged for a group to buy the shares in the team and hired Conn Smythe to be the managing director, which kept the team in Toronto. Bickell owned the majority stake in the team, which was renamed the Toronto Maple Leafs. With Smythe, Bickell helped in the organization and financing of the construction of the arena, named Maple Leaf Gardens, for the Leafs in 1931. "You could say, without exaggerating, that Bickell was the cornerstone of the whole project," said Smythe. He was to be the first president of Maple Leaf Gardens Ltd. and also served as chairman, until a board of directors meeting on November 19, 1947, when Bickell made arrangements for Conn Smythe to have controlling interest and become the president. Bickell then served as a director until his death. His name is on the Stanley Cup six times: 1932, 1945, 1947, 1948, 1949, 1951. He was not included on the Cup with 1942 Toronto, as he was overseas serving in World War II. Bickell died in 1951, and work was underway to appropriately honor his contribution to the organization. In 1953, the Toronto Maple Leafs board of directors established the J. P. Bickell Memorial Award. Bickell was inducted into the Hockey Hall of Fame in 1978 in the Builders category.

=== Golf ===
In 1922, he built a mansion, adjacent to the Mississaugua Golf & Country Club, in the town of Port Credit, Ontario, where he would live for the rest of his life. Bickell's involvement in the club was significant as he had sat on the board of directors, and he loaned the club $50,000 during the depression and was a life member. On the morning of August 15, 1925, Bickell made a 215-yard hole-in-one on the third hole, the first person to ever "ace" the hole. On November 15, 1924, it was J.P. Bickell who gave Ada Mackenzie the final $8,000 two hours before her deadline to secure the land for the Ladies Golf Club of Toronto. "it was Mr. Bickell who saved our life". - Ada Mackenzie

=== Baseball ===
In 1931, Bickell also served as a director of the Toronto Maple Leafs baseball club, owning an interest and joining the board of directors when George Oakley took control of the team.

=== General ===
In 1939, Bickell bought the 2600-acre island in Georgian Bay, Ontario. He formed Griffith Island Estates Inc., as the president with his friends; Bernard E. Smith, R.S. "Sam" McLaughlin, Thomas Seagram, Francis Farwell, J.L Sullivan, W. Anderson. The estate was for the purpose of a hunting and fishing retreat entertaining various dignitaries as the island boasted pheasants, deer, and wild game. They were also raising Hereford cattle on the island. As an avid fisherman Bickell also had shares in the Hillsburgh Fishing Club.

== Second World War ==
During the Second World War, Bickell was a key member of a group under Canadian Max Aitken, 1st Baron Beaverbrook, the British Minister of Aircraft Production, which ensured an adequate supply of airplanes for the British forces. On July 24, 1940, in London, UK he was appointed the Controller of the Air Transport Auxiliary (ATA), in July 1941 the ATA became the RAF Ferry Command and subsequently The Atlantic Ferry Organization (ATFERO). Bickell served two years with the British Airplane Supply Board. Along with other important businessmen and industrialists known as the "4 Busy B's" with Beaverbrook, (former Prime Minister) R. B. Bennett and Beverly Baxter (M.P.). Bickell was recruited by his friend Lord Beaverbrook to become one of the famous "dollar-a-year" men who headed up wartime industry and special projects. In 1942, he returned to Canada to become the president and chairman of the board of Victory Aircraft Ltd. in Malton, Ontario, the largest airplane manufacturer in Canada. Bickell was tasked with increasing the Avro Lancaster bomber production resulting in one per day rolling off the assembly line. This effort was credited with ultimately having a dramatic influence on winning the war.

It was no secret that Bickell was not a fan of the federal government of the day. Regardless, Bickell's sense of duty to the nation prevailed, and his commitment to the war effort on both sides of the Atlantic was unassailable. Bickell's personal actions at the outbreak of the Second World War were very generous. On September 12, 1939, Bickell donated his Grumman Goose G21A CF BKE to the RCAF, which took it on strength with the military serial RCAF924. On November 1, 1940, J.P. donated his other plane, a Grumman Goose G-21A CF-BQE, which became RCAF 941 on November 1, 1940. The Grumman Goose G-21A aircraft were amphibious planes and during that time known as the rich man's aircraft.

In 1942 Bickell wrote a cheque for five thousand dollars, which he donated to the RCAF's Benevolent Fund. In a letter that accompanied the cheque, Bickell wrote

"If there is any branch of the services which merits recognition in a deferential degree, surely it must be that in which the personnel suffer the highest percentage of casualties in relationship to their numbers, namely the air force. Furthermore, I am firmly convinced that had it not been for the indomitable courage, skill and sacrifices endured by them during the Battle of Britain, the destiny of democracy everywhere would long since have been shattered beyond recognition, if not completely eliminated. When one realizes that the age range in this group comprises mainly of those just on the threshold of life and normally therefore with the longest expectancy before them, the tragedy to both them and their families becomes even more poignant".

== Aviation history ==
After the war, Bickell co-founded A. V. Roe Canada Limited (AVRO), Avro Canada with Sir Roy Dobson which took over the Victory Aircraft Plant and was a wholly owned subsidiary of Hawker Siddeley. He paid the $1,200 incorporation fee out of his own pocket, and personally backed a $2.5 million line of credit at the Canadian Bank of Commerce, of which he was a director. Dobson became the President and Bickell became the chairman, a position he held until his death in August 1951.

== Directorships ==
In business, Bickell served as the Chairman of McIntyre-Porcupine Mines Limited, Maple Leaf Gardens, Toronto Maple Leafs and A. V. Roe Canada Limited (AVRO) He was also a director of Canadian Bank of Commerce, International Nickel Company of Canada (INCO), Imperial Life Assurance, and National Trust. He was also an active in healthcare, serving on several boards, including that of Wellesley Hospital, St. John's Ambulance Association and he was the honorary president of the Health League of Canada.

== Philanthropy ==
In the late 1930s, the radio station and newsprint building burnt down in Timmins. It was owned by Roy Thomson and it was J.P. Bickell who loaned him the necessary funds to re-build. In 1945, he provided the loan Jack Kent Cooke needed to buy Toronto radio station CKEY. During his life, Bickell gave generously and in death, he willed $13 million of his $14.6 million estate to the creation of the J.P. Bickell Foundation managed by National Trust Company (now ScotiaTrust a division of Scotiabank). He established it to donate half of its interest income each year at; 50% to the Hospital for Sick Children, 10% for bursaries aiding in Medical Research, 5% to Mining scholarships and 35% to be distributed to general charities in Ontario at the discretion of the J.P. Bickell Foundation Management Committee. The Foundation has generated over $300M and contributed $160 million to charity from 1953 to 2017. Upon his death he bequeathed a multi-million dollar collection of approximately 112 pieces of original artwork and artifacts to the Art Gallery of Ontario (AGO), of which he was a founder-member. Camp Bickell is a non-profit children's camp that was established on Chapman Lake initially in 1939 with the assistance of Mr. Bickell and in 1949, he provided the necessary funds of $5,000 to permanently secure the land. The camp near Iroquois Falls is still in operation today (2017) and receives approximately 600 campers per season.

== Death ==
J.P. Bickell died in New York City on August 22, 1951, at age 66 and was buried in the Mausoleum at Mount Pleasant Cemetery in Toronto. Bickell's life work and philanthropy isn't well known because he was a private man who did not seek self promotion. His self-built business empire allowed him to be extremely charitable, a legacy that has continued after his death.
