= Assomption Boulevard =

North–south thoroughfare in Montreal, Quebec, Canada

Coordinates: 45.5735°N 73.5599°W

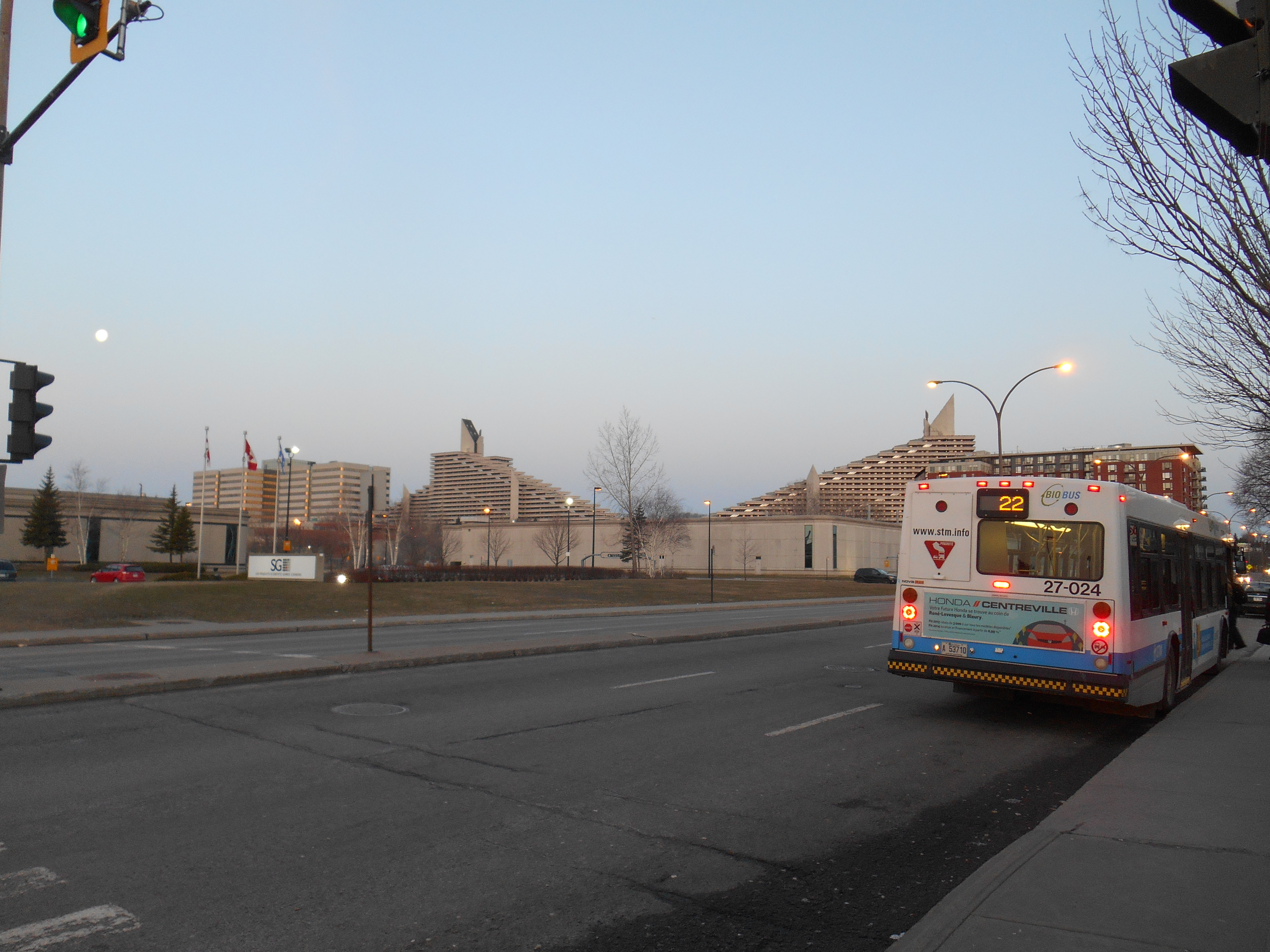
- An STM bus waits outside the Assomption metro station.
- Interactive map of Assomption Boulevard
- Native name: Boulevard de l'Assomption (French)
- Former names: Rue Poulin, 45e Avenue
- Length: 3.6 km (2.2 mi)
- Location: Between Hochelaga Street and Jean-Talon Street
- Major junctions: R-138

Construction
- Inauguration: December 3, 1951

Assomption Boulevard (French: boulevard de l'Assomption) is a main north–south street in the Montreal boroughs of Mercier–Hochelaga-Maisonneuve, Rosemont–La Petite-Patrie and Saint-Léonard.

== Description ==
The boulevard is 3.6 kilometres long and starts at its intersection with Hochelaga Street and ends at its intersection with Jean-Talon Street. The Assomption metro station is located on the boulevard south of Sherbrooke Street East, at the corner with Chauveau Street. The Hôpital Maisonneuve-Rosemont (the largest hospital in Quebec) is on the north-east side of Assomption where it intersects with Boulevard Rosemont, and on the facing south-west of the boulevard are the Olympic Village and the classic garden city development of Cité-jardin du Tricentenaire.

The boulevard got its name in 1951 in honor of the proclamation of the Dogma of the Assumption of Mary a year earlier by Pope Pius XII.

== Planned extension and maintenance ==
Since 2013 there have been plans to improve access to the Port of Montreal by extending the boulevard to Notre-Dame Street. This has led to conflicts regarding zoning restrictions in the borough of Mercier–Hochelaga-Maisonneuve. Plans have also been delayed by the costs of decontaminating the old Canadian Steel Foundries site (cleared in 2004) at the southern end of the boulevard.

In 2016, ten million dollars were invested in renovations on the stretch of the boulevard through the borough of Rosemont–La Petite-Patrie, after protests by residents the previous year.

== Notable buildings ==
Hôpital Maisonneuve-Rosemont, a regional hospital serving the east end of Montreal. Founded in 1971, it is the largest hospital in Quebec and employs more than 15,000 people.
