= James C. Floyd =

Canadian aerospace engineer (born 1914)

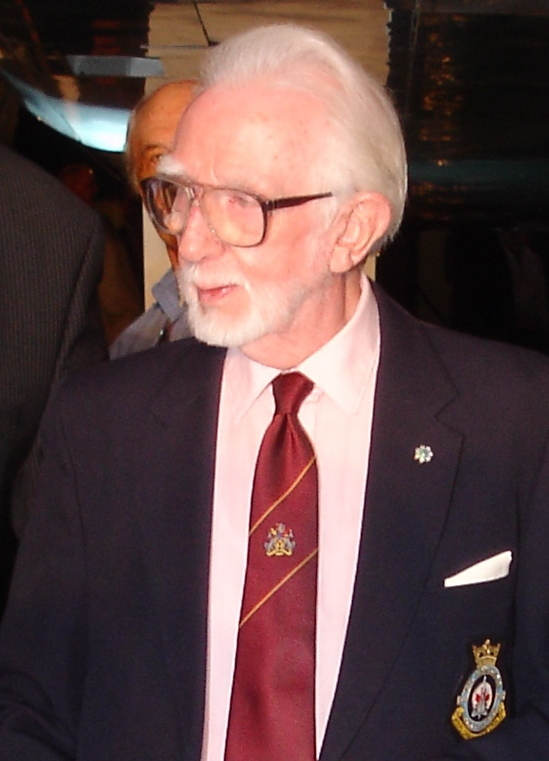
- Floyd at the Canadian Air and Space Museum in 2006
- Born: James Charles Floyd; 20 October 1914; Manchester, Lancashire, England
- Other name: Jim Floyd
- Citizenship: Canadian/British
- Education: UMIST
- Occupation: Aeronautical engineer
- Years active: 1930–1979
- Employer: Avro
- Notable work: Avro Canada C102 Jetliner; Avro Canada CF-100 Canuck; Avro Canada CF-105 Arrow
- Spouse: Irene Floyd (m. 1940; died 2014)
- Awards: Wright Brothers Medal (1950)

James Charles Floyd (born 20 October 1914) is a former British-Canadian aeronautical engineer. He became the Avro Aircraft Ltd. (Canada) chief design engineer and was involved in the design and development of the Avro Canada C-102 Jetliner, Avro Canada CF-100 Canuck and Avro Canada CF-105 Arrow aircraft.

== Early career ==
James Charles Floyd was born in Manchester, England on 20 October 1914. He began his career in the aviation industry in January 1930 at the age of 15 as an apprentice with A.V. Roe Company in the United Kingdom. Growing up next to the A.V. Roe manufacturing plant, he was chosen by Sir Roy Dobson to train young boys in the aviation field. Floyd attended technical school and later graduated from UMIST in 1934, where he earned a diploma in engineering in 1945. As a part of his education, he also worked in a variety of different positions at the A.V. Roe plant in between attending classes. He spent the last 6 months of this training at the A.V. Roe airfield at Woodford, where he learned to fly in a monoplane.

After graduating, Floyd joined Roy Chadwick's group of designers and worked with Chadwick on the Avro Anson, Manchester, Lancaster, York and Lincoln designs. He was part of a small team that turned the twinjet Manchester into the four-engined jet aircraft Lancaster bomber. He was later appointed Chief Project Engineer at the Avro design office in Yorkshire, working on the application of jet technology to transport aircraft. During his early career he worked under the guidance of Sir Sydney Camm of Hawker Aircraft, designer of the Hurricane Fighter and the Harrier 'Jump Jet'.

== Avro Canada ==
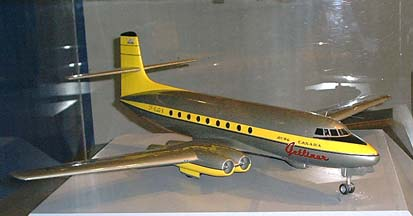
Model of the Avro Jetliner

Floyd moved to Canada to join the new A.V. Roe Canada, known as Avro Canada, in 1946. In 1952, he was named Chief Engineer. He worked on aircraft such as the C102 Avro Jetliner, CF-100 Canuck jet fighter, and CF-105 Avro Arrow supersonic interceptor. Floyd's work on jet transport in the United Kingdom led to the Avro Canada C102 Jetliner. The Jetliner was designed for requirements specified by Trans Canada Airlines (TCA) in 1946. Despite being the first jet-powered airliner in North America, and the second to fly worldwide, the Jetliner never went into production. When the Canadian government insisted that Avro concentrate on its jet engine and CF-100 designs, Floyd was named as Project Designer for the CF-100 in 1952.

Like thousands of other Avro Canada employees, Floyd was laid off in the wake of the Avro CF-105 Arrow/Orenda Iroquois engine cancellation of 20 February 1959. After securing positions in other companies for many of the engineers in his department, Floyd and his family moved back to England in 1959. He led the Hawker Siddeley's Advanced Projects Group that developed the HSA.1000 SST design. It was evaluated as part of a joint research study with Bristol whose design ultimately became the Concorde. Later, Floyd worked as a consultant from 1965 to 1972. (Note: An entire chapter, "The SST Saga: Canadian Contributions Exposed" in Avro Aircraft and Cold War Aviation is devoted to the work of Floyd in the UK. His role in SST development is fully detailed.)

== Later life ==
Floyd and his family returned to Canada in 1981. In 2014, his wife, Irene, died after 74 years of marriage. He celebrated his 100th birthday on 20 October.

== Honors ==
In 1950, Floyd was awarded the Wright Brothers Medal from the Society of Automotive Engineers for his paper on the Jetliner (the first non-American recipient). In 1993, he was inducted into the Canadian Aviation Hall of Fame and named a Companion of the Order of Flight by the City of Edmonton. Floyd was awarded the J.A. McCurdy trophy in 1958 for his work on the Avro Arrow. In May 2000, he was awarded an Honorary Doctor of Engineering Design by the Royal Military College of Canada.

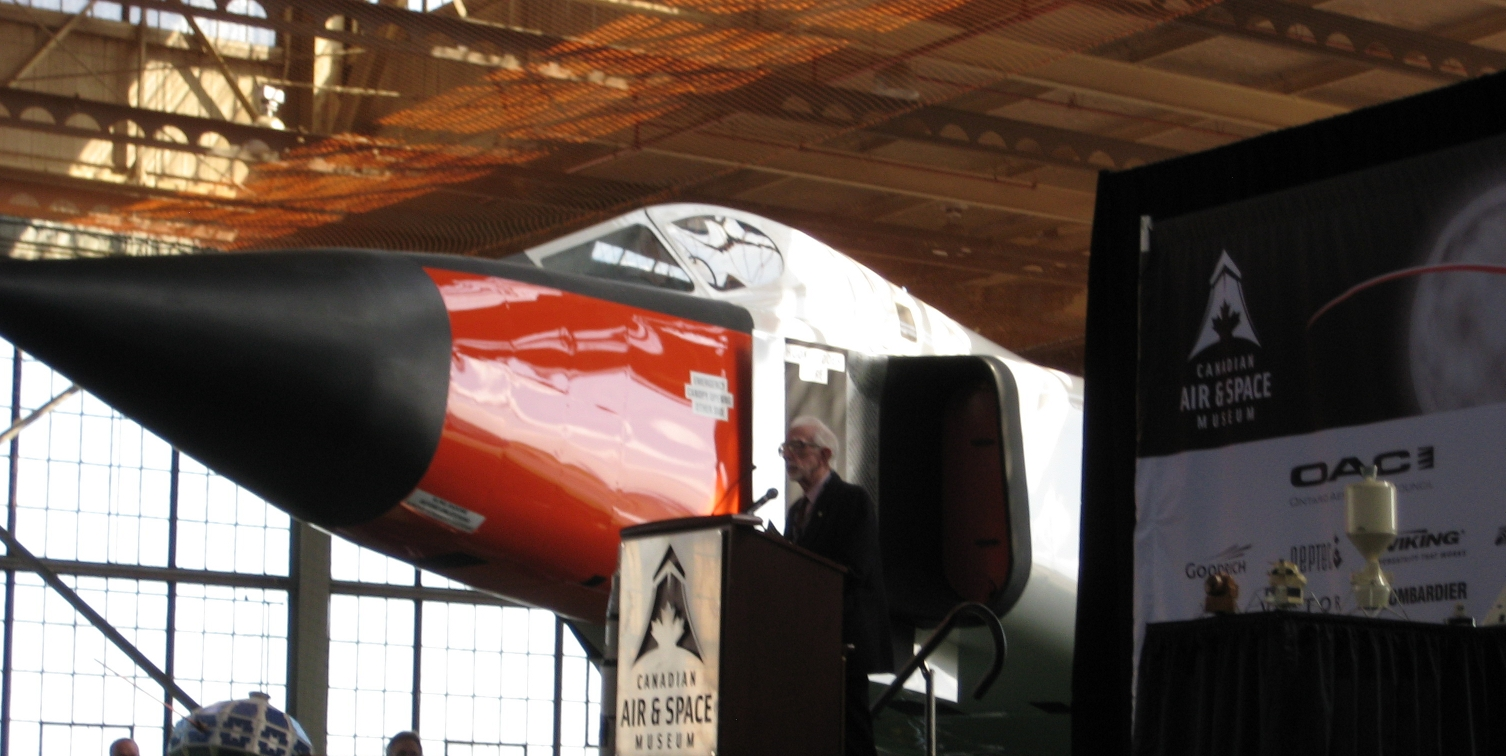
20 July 2009

On 20 July 2009, Floyd was awarded the first Canadian Air and Space Pioneer Award in a ceremony at the former Canadian Air and Space Museum at Downsview Park, Toronto, Canada.

The James C. Floyd Award is presented annually by the Aerospace Industries Association of Canada to an individual or team that has made an exceptional contribution to Canada's aerospace industry. It has been presented annually since 2010. It was named after James C. Floyd due to his status as "one of the great figures in Canada's aviation history," and his role in developing the C-102 Jetliner, the CF-100 fighter, and the Avro Arrow.
