= Canadian Steel Foundries =

Canadian metallurgy company

Canadian Steel Foundries (founded 1910) was a Canadian metallurgy company which once had works in Montreal, Gatineau and Welland.

== History ==
Through Arthur James Nesbitt, £410,000 of bonds were floated on the London market in March 1911 to finance operations. One of the major investors was Rudyard Kipling.

In 1935, Canadian Steel Foundries was amalgamated to Canadian Car and Foundry, which in turn was acquired by A.V. Roe Canada (part of the Hawker Siddeley Group) in 1955. In 1956 A.V. Roe spun out the foundries division as a distinct but wholly owned subsidiary under the revived name Canadian Steel Foundries. In 1962 Hawker Siddeley Canada liquidated A.V. Roe and took over Canadian Steel Foundries.

== Montreal works ==
The Montreal workshops, established in the borough of Mercier–Hochelaga-Maisonneuve in 1912, were once among the largest steelworks in North America.

=== Closing ===
The Montreal works were closed in 2004 and in 2014 the site was still awaiting decontamination and redevelopment. In 2005 the city of Montreal announced that steps would be taken to preserve the historical memory of the works, with documents, photographs, videos, and technical plans deposited with the Bibliothèque et Archives nationales du Québec, and ten casting molds of various sizes transferred to the Centre d'histoire de Montréal.

In 2013 plans were announced to improve access to the Port of Montreal by extending De L'Assomption Boulevard through the former Canadian Steel Foundries site.
