= Fred Smye =

Canadian businessman (1916–1985)

Frederick Thomas Smye (August 6, 1916 – 1985) was a Canadian businessman. He was the president of Avro Aircraft Limited (Canada).

He was born in Hamilton, Ontario, the son of Frederick Thomas Smye and Maude Givern, and was educated at Trinity College in Port Hope. In 1939, he married Dorothy Jean Carswell. Smye first worked with the Canadian aircraft industry during World War II in 1940 as an official in the New York, Washington and Ottawa offices of the Department of Munitions and Supply, eventually becoming Director of Aircraft Production. In 1944 he was appointed Assistant General Manager of Federal Aircraft Limited in Montreal to wind up the Canadian Government's aircraft production program. At the close of the war he played a key role in establishing the British Hawker Siddeley Group in Canada through the formation of A.V. Roe Canada Limited. On August 1, 1945, Smye became the first employee of A.V. Roe Canada established in the former Victory Aircraft facilities at Malton, Ontario. With the official formation of Avro Aircraft on December 1, 1945, he was appointed Assistant General Manager. He was a lead administrator of all the major Avro projects: the Jetliner, the CF-100, the Orenda engines to power it, and the Arrow supersonic interceptor. He held various A. V. Roe Canada positions including President of Avro Aircraft, Executive Vice-President (aeronautical) and Board Member of several A. V. Roe subsidiaries.

After the cancellation of the Arrow by the Diefenbaker government in 1959, Smye resigned from A. V. Roe in 1960 and in 1963 purchased Canadian Ofrex Limited, running the company as President until selling it in 1972. He emigrated to the Algarve in Portugal in 1973 where lived until he died of cancer in December 1985.
