= Aidan Devine =

British actor

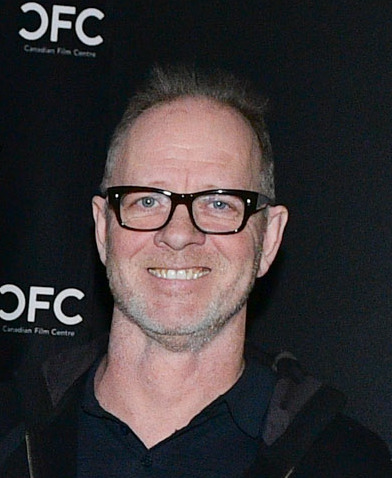
- Aidan Devine at the National Canadian Film Day
- Born: England
- Occupation: Actor
- Years active: 1985–present

Aidan Devine is an English actor.

== Early life ==
Devine was born in England and emigrated with his family to Canada at the age of 15. He studied at Dawson College's Dome Theatre in Montreal, Quebec and began his acting career in Montreal. He would later relocate to Toronto, Ontario.

== Career ==
His 1993 breakout role came in Denys Arcand's, Love and Human Remains. Since then he has worked steadily in Canadian and American television and cinema capturing two Gemini Awards; a best actor award in 1997 for his performance as Ted Lindsay in Net Worth and in 1998, a best supporting actor Gemini for his performance as airframe engineer, Jim Chamberlin in The Arrow. He has been nominated three other times.

== Filmography ==
=== Film ===
Year	Title	Role	Notes
1985	Night Magic	Beggar	
1986	The Boy in Blue	Junior Cop	
1987	And Then You Die	McCaffrey	
1988	The Jeweller's Shop	Resident 1	
1988	Criminal Law	Reporter	
1990	A Touch of Murder	Curtis	
1990	Falling Over Backwards	Young man at door	
1993	Love & Human Remains	Sal	Credited as Aidan Devin
1995	Iron Eagle on the Attack	Corporal Fincher	Direct-to-video
1996	Joe's Wedding	Fred McCarthy	
1997	Dinner at Fred's	Officer Mike	
1999	Striking Poses	Stalker / Badger	Direct-to-video
1999	Judgment Day: The Ellie Nesler Story	Brandon's Father	
2001	Don't Say a Word	Leon Croft	
2003	Cold Creek Manor	Skip Linton	
2004	Against the Ropes	Crisco	
2004	Vendetta: No Conscience, No Mercy	John Phelan	
2005	The Dark Hours	Harlan Pyne	
2005	A History of Violence	Charlie Roarke	
2006	Everything's Gone Green	Alan	
2008	Outlander	Einar	
2009	Dolan's Cadillac	Roman	
2010	Sophie and Sheba	Nate Collins	
2012	Mad Ship	Edmund	
2013	The Informant	Bobby Sims	
2014	WolfCop	Chief	
2014	October Gale	Al Tessier	
2015	The Birdwatcher	Wynn Wilson	
2016	Suicide Squad	Chairman	
2018	Backstabbing for Beginners	Justin Cutter	
2018	22 Chaser	Ray	
2018	Catch and Release	Robert	
2018	I'll Take Your Dead	William	
2021	We're All in This Together	Marv	
2023	Transformers: Rise of the Beasts	Bishop	
2024	Abducted Off the Street: The Carlesha Gaither Story	Detective Darby	

=== Television ===
Year	Title	Role	Notes
1990	Descending Angel	Security Clerk	TV movie
1990–1992	Heritage Minutes	Jim Chamerlain / Various roles	5 episodes
1992	The Boys of St. Vincent	Brother Michael Davitt	TV movie
1992	Urban Angel		Episode: "Angele"
1993	Dieppe	Casey	TV movie
1994	RoboCop	Harry Flitch	Episode: "Provision 22"
1994	Against Their Will: Women in Prison		TV movie
1994	Sirens	Det. Rangall	4 episodes
1995	Kung Fu: The Legend Continues	Bertrand	Episode: "The Sacred Chalice of I-Ching"
1995	Due South	Robert Kruger	Episode: "The Witness"
1995	Net Worth	Ted Lindsay	TV movie
1996	Gotti	James McBratney	TV movie
1996	F/X: The Series	Terry Kent	Episode: "The Brotherhood"
1996	Max the Cat	Narrator	Voice
1997	The Arrow	Jim Chamberlain	Miniseries
1997	Too Close to Home		TV movie
1997	Joe Torre: Curveballs Along the Way	Wade Boggs	TV movie
1997	Trucks	Trucker Bob	TV movie
1997	Promise the Moon	James Bennett	TV movie
1998	Made in Canada	Walter Franklin, Jr.	Episode: "A Death in the Family"
1999	The City	Shane Devlin	TV movie
1999	36 Hours to Die	Al	TV movie
1999	The City	Father Shane Devlin	13 episodes
2000	Power Play		Episode: "What It All Meant"
2000	The Wishing Tree	Detective Crane	TV movie
2000	Twice in a Lifetime	Mr. Ryder	Episode: "The Sins of Our Fathers"
2000	Who Killed Atlanta's Children?	Jack Johnson	TV movie
2001	Life with Judy Garland: Me and My Shadows	Frank Gumm	Miniseries; 2 episodes
2001	La Femme Nikita	Graff	4 episodes
2001	Mysterious Ways	Bob Tolland	Episode: "29"
2001	MythQuest	Bryn	Episode: "Blodeuwedd"
2001	Brian's Song	Abe Gibron	TV movie
2001	Dice	Marcus Starck	Miniseries; 6 episodes
2001	A Wind at My Back Christmas	Inspector Wells	TV movie
2002	Trudeau	The Reporter (Tim Ralfe)	Miniseries
2002	Widows	Mike Resnick	Miniseries; 4 episodes
2002	100 Days in the Jungle	Barry Meyer	TV movie
2002	Scar Tissue	Nick Nevsky	TV movie
2003	Ice Bound: A Woman's Survival at the South Pole	John Penny	TV movie
2003	The Reagans	Bill Shelby	TV movie
2003	Veritas: The Quest	Grey Man / Tollan	6 episodes
2004	Missing	Agent Moses Rogers	Episode: "These Dreams Before Me"
2004	Wonderfalls	Father Joe Scofield	Episode: "Wound-up Penguin"
2004	The Shields Stories	MJ	Miniseries; 5 episodes
2004	Wild Card	Eric Vantana	Episode: "Wham Bam, Thank You Dan"
2005	Puppets Who Kill	Gus the Arsonist	Episode: "Gus the Arsonist"
2005	Kojak	Piper	2 episodes
2005	Our Fathers	Bernie McDaid	TV movie
2005	Queer as Folk	Darryl	Episode: "Hard Decisions"
2006	Prairie Giant	MJ Coldwell	Miniseries; 2 episodes
2006	North/South	Brendan Kilcoyne	TV series
2006	The House Next Door	Buck	TV movie
2007	Involuntary Muscles	Babcock	TV movie
2007	St. Urbain's Horseman	Freddy Ormsby-Fletcher	Episode: "Part 1 & 2"
2008	The Border	Dwayne Urquhart	Episode: "Gross Deceptions"
2008	M.V.P.	Adam McBride	2 episodes
2010	Keep Your Head Up, Kid: The Don Cherry Story		2 episodes
2010	Rookie Blue	Staff Sgt. Boyko	5 episodes
2011	Republic of Doyle	Hal Gushue	Episode: "Popeye Doyle"
2011	John A.: Birth of a Country	John Sandfield Macdonald	TV movie
2011	Certain Prey	Sloan	TV movie
2012	Flashpoint	Terry Burnett	Episode: "Eyes In"
2012, 2024	Murdoch Mysteries	Desmond Rutherford / Duncan Campbell	2 episodes
2013	Motive	Barry Ketchum	Episode: "Detour"
2013	Hannibal	Eldon Stammets	Episode: "Amuse-Bouche"
2013	Covert Affairs	Deric Hughes	4 episodes
2014	24 Hour Rental	Detective Marlowe	4 episodes
2014	The Divide	Kucik's Father	3 episodes
2015	Two Wrongs	Gerald	TV movie
2016	The Girlfriend Experience	Martin Bayley	8 episodes
2016	American Gothic	Gunther Holzman	3 episodes
2016	Eyewitness	Bo Waldenbeck	9 episodes
2016–2017	Blood and Water	Lt. Dan Barron	6 episodes
2017	Killjoys	Last Seer	Episode: "The Hullen Have Eyes"
2017	Designated Survivor	Paul Zalesky	Episode: "Equilibrium"
2018	The Detectives	Detective Don Forgan	Episode: "Father's Day"
2018	Impulse	Sheriff Frederick Dale	6 episodes
2019–2020	The Bold Type	RJ Safford	6 episodes
2019–2020	In the Dark	Vincent	6 episodes
2019–2022	Diggstown	Ezra Elvins	4 episodes
2021	Good Witch	Logan Mann	Episode: "The Wishes"
2021	Holly Hobbie	Charlie	2 episodes
2022	Five Days at Memorial	Bowles	Miniseries; episode: "Day Four"
2024	The Umbrella Academy	Gary	2 episodes

== Awards and nominations ==
=== Gemini Awards ===
- Nominated: Best Performance by an Actor in a Supporting Role, Dieppe (1995)
- Won: Best Performance by an Actor in a Leading Role in a Dramatic Program, Net Worth (1997)
- Won: Best Performance by an Actor in a Featured Supporting Role in a Dramatic Program or Mini-Series, The Arrow (1998)
- Nominated: Best Performance by an Actor in a Featured Supporting Role in a Dramatic Program or Mini-Series, 100 Days In The Jungle (2003)
- Nominated: Best Performance by an Actor in a Featured Supporting Role in a Dramatic Program or Mini-Series, Scar Tissue (2003)
