= McIntyre Porcupine Mines =

Canadian mining company (1911–1989)

- Industry: Gold mining
- Founded: 16 March 1911
- Defunct: 14 November 1989
- Fate: Acquired by Falconbridge
- Headquarters: Toronto (1911–1980); Calgary (1980–1989)

McIntyre Porcupine Mines Limited, and after 1974 McIntyre Mines Limited, was a Canadian mining company that existed from 1911 to 1989. Its iconic headframe, located near downtown Timmins, has come to represent the entire Porcupine Gold Rush. The McIntyre also yielded a considerable amount of copper over its life.

There has been an extensive degree of rehabilitation and exploration work performed in and around the old McIntyre Mine property in recent years, and the Porcupine Joint Venture has yet to decide whether or not to continue spending hundreds of millions of dollars on mining out the property or continuing with a closure plan (2007).

== History ==
Sandy McIntyre (1869-1943) had immigrated to Canada from Scotland around the turn of the century. He had changed his name from Alexander Oliphant and in 1906 became a prospector, exploring Northern Ontario.

McIntyre Porcupine was formed in 1911, adding land staked by Sandy McIntyre to nearby ground obtained by J. P. Bickell. Although the initial assays were lean, Bickell kept the company afloat through tough times. Later, as grades improved, he obtained additional ground. In 1919, Bickell left the investment business to become president and then chairman of McIntyre-Porcupine Mines.

McIntyre sold his interest for $65,325, of which $60,000 was never collected. He did receive a pension for the use of his name however. Ownership by Charles Flynn, A. Freeman and then J.P. Bickell. McIntyre Mine was incorporated in 1912. An investment in the mine was made by Henry Pellatt in 1915. By 1924, the mine included 626 acres, including the former Jupiter and Pearl Lake mines, besides the Plenaurum and Platt Veteran properties.

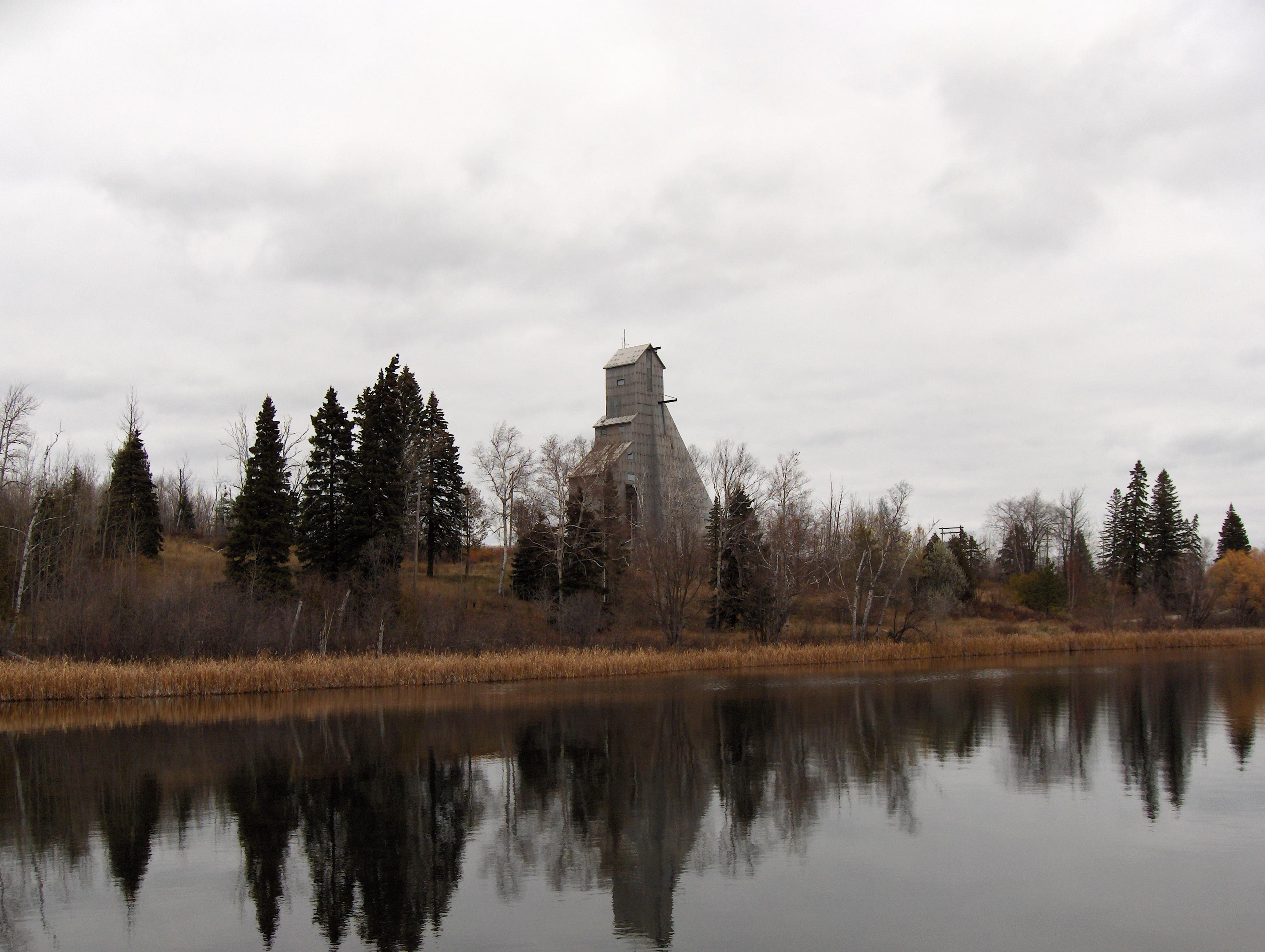
McIntyre Mine headframe

The McIntyre (Number 11) headframe was completed in 1927. The shaft, along with new shops, processing, administrative and change facilities were all located on the north shore of Pearl Lake. This led to the subsequent abandonment and demolition of the original mill located to the south west of the new facilities. The six-compartment shaft excavation underneath it was 4,250 feet (1,300 m) deep and 160,000 tons of rock, as well as 40,000 tons of water, were removed in the process. The project used 240,000 pounds of powder to blast the rock and 2,256,000 feet (688,000 m) of Douglas fir to timber the shaft.

In its early days the McIntyre mine was a nightmare of problems. It was remarked "it is doubtful if any major mining corporation anywhere was ever established on a shakier foundation." Mine manager Dick Ennis told how he ran to the bank with hot bullion bars to cover a payroll and how he disappeared underground to hide from creditors. In later years the large profits from the mine enabled J. P. Bickell to loan the funds to Conn Smythe for the construction of Maple Leaf Gardens in Toronto. During the 1930s the company constructed the McIntyre Community Center in Schumacher. The facility includes both a hockey arena and a curling rink. It has since been taken over by the City of Timmins. The mine was owned and operated by the McIntyre company until 1973 after which it was sold to Pamour Porcupine Mines.

Overcoming the obstacles (thanks to Ennis) the McIntyre Mine went on to set a long list of firsts in mining and milling practices, as well as in health and safety. It was the first mine in Canada to have a metallurgist on the mill staff and employing a graduate engineer as mine superintendent. It was also the first in Canada to use rubber liners in milling and the first in the Porcupine camp to apply square-set and cut-and-fill stope mining. Gunitting was developed there it adapted and introduced flotation to gold milling. They were the first in Ontario to sink a shaft to below 4,000 feet.

=== McIntyre Powder ===
Ennis established mine safety procedures, including a daily report on safety conditions underground, a standard that is common today, and an attempt to tackle the serious health problem of silicosis. At the time, European researchers had hypothesized that the scarring of lungs caused by silicosis was the result of a complex chemical reaction between silica particles and lung tissue, although this is now known to be inaccurate. A McIntyre research group, which included the world-renowned Banting Institute of the University of Toronto, pursued the goal of finding a way of eliminating or reducing the solubility of silica particles by using small quantities of metallic aluminum dust in a two-stage dry that miners passed when they returned to surface. The non-profit McIntyre Research Foundation was formed to further the use of the treatment throughout the world mining industry. In 2015, the McIntyre Powder Project and Occupational Health Clinics for Ontario Workers began investigating the link between the McIntyre aluminum dust treatment and neurological disorders, including ALS and Parkinson's disease. The McIntyre Powder Project is a registry for miners who have health issues and who have been exposed to McIntyre Powder aluminum dust. In 2024, a study found that workers exposed to McIntrye Powder had "modestly elevated rates" of cardiovascular disease.

=== Production ===
Between 1912 and 1955 production was valued at $230 million and the company paid $62 million in dividends to shareholders. From 1912 to 1988 there were 37,529,691 tons milled, producing 10,745,361 ounces of gold, an overall grade of 0.29 ounces per ton. In the early 1960s a substantial body of copper ore was noted north west of the old #6 shaft. By 1965 this was put into production and was an important addition to McIntyre Mine economics through the exhaustion of reserves in 1984.

== See also ==
- List of mines in Ontario
