= Herbert James Symington =

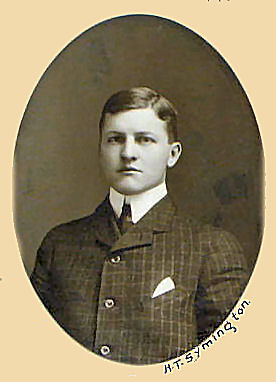
- Symington in a 1905 Osgoode Hall Law School class composite photograph.
- Born: November 22, 1881; Sarnia, Ontario
- Died: September 28, 1965 (aged 83); Montreal, Quebec
- Occupations: lawyer, businessman

Herbert James Symington, PC CMG (November 22, 1881 – September 28, 1965) was a Canadian lawyer and businessman.

From 1941 to 1947 he was president of Trans-Canada Airlines. He was the founding president of the International Air Transport Association.
