= SIFCO Industries =

American metal component manufacturer

SIFCO Industries, Inc.
- Company type: Public company
- Traded as: AMEX: SIF; Russell Microcap Index component
- Industry: Metal
- Founded: 1916 as Steel Improvement and Forge Co. 1969 as SIFCO Industries Inc.
- Headquarters: Cleveland, Ohio, United States
- Key people: Peter W. Knapper (President, & CEO); Salvatore Incanno (CFO)
- Products: forging
- Revenue: ▼US$100 million (2021)
- Operating income: ▼ -US$1.1 million (2021)
- Net income: ▼ -US$0.7 million (2021)
- Total assets: ▼US$111 million (2021)
- Total equity: ▼US$50 million (2021)
- Number of employees: 378 (2021)
- Website: http://www.sifco.com/

SIFCO Industries, Inc. (SIFCO), is a global metal component manufacturer based in Cleveland, Ohio.

== Current operations ==
SIFCO is engaged in the production of forgings and machined components primarily for the aerospace and energy markets. SIFCO's products are made primarily of steel, stainless steel, titanium, and aluminum and include: OEM and aftermarket components for aircraft and industrial gas turbine engines, steam turbine blades, structural airframe components, aircraft landing gear components, aircraft wheels and brakes, critical rotating components for helicopters, and commercial/industrial products.

SIFCO's manufacturing facilities are located in Cleveland, Ohio; Alliance, Ohio; Orange, California and Maniago, Italy.

In 2016, Rolls-Royce accounted for 11% of SIFCO's sales and United Technologies Corporation accounted for 10% of SIFCO's sales.

== History ==
SIFCO traces its roots to 1913.

In 2010, SIFCO acquired the forging business of T&W Forge, Inc. based in Alliance, Ohio.

In 2011, SIFCO acquired Quality Aluminum Forge based in Orange, California.

In 2016, Peter Knapper was named as president and CEO.
