= Chief project engineer =

Occupation

The chief project engineer (CPE) is a member of the design organisation of an aeronautical company, required by the European Aviation Safety Agency. The CPE is responsible, on behalf of the head of design organisation (HDO), for the technical aspects of the development of a specific aeronautical product and its sub-assemblies.

The main functions and responsibilities of the CPE are:

- Preparation of system requirement specification
- to assure the configuration of complex design solutions and the definition of the product architecture according to the contractual requirements
- to ensure that project requirements are delivered by competent personnel
- to verify the availability and suitability of technologies to assure the development of the project
- to coordinate the activities of definition and configuration control ensuring that the product conforms to design requirements.
- to assure the activities of project/product verification and ensure that the product conforms to the defined requirement and standards
- to liaise with the flight test division in the definition of test plans
- to liaise with the airworthiness department for continuous airworthiness of the product

== See also ==
- EUROCONTROL
- Civil Aviation Authority
- European Aviation Safety Agency
