= Avro Canada =

Canadian aerospace company (1945–1962)

- Type: Subsidiary
- Industry: Aerospace
- Founded: 1 September 1945
- Defunct: 1 May 1962
- Fate: Aircraft divested, remainder restructured
- Successor: Hawker Siddeley Canada; Orenda Engines
- Headquarters: Toronto, Ontario, Canada
- Key people: Crawford Gordon Jr. James C. Floyd; Jack Frost; Janusz Żurakowski
- Products: Aircraft, Turbojet engines
- Number of employees: 50,000 (1958)
- Parent: Avro
- Subsidiaries: Orenda Engines; Canadian Car and Foundry; Dominion Steel and Coal Corporation

Avro Canada, officially A. V. Roe Canada Limited, was a Canadian aircraft manufacturing company that existed from 1945 to 1962. It was founded in 1945 as an aircraft plant and within 13 years became the third-largest company in Canada, and one of the 100 largest companies in the world, directly employing over 50,000 people. Avro Canada was best known for the CF-105 Arrow, but it was an integrated company with diverse holdings.

Following the cancellation of the CF-105 Arrow, the company ceased operations in 1962.

== A.V. Roe Canada ==
=== Origins ===
During World War II, Victory Aircraft in Malton, Ontario, was Canada's largest aircraft manufacturer. Prior to 1939, as a part of National Steel Car of Hamilton, the concern was one of a number of "shadow factories" set up in Canada to produce British aircraft designs far out of range of enemy attack. National Steel Car produced Avro Anson trainers, Handley Page Hampden bombers, Hawker Hurricane fighters and Westland Lysander army cooperation aircraft. National Steel Car Corporation of Malton, Ontario was formed in 1938 and renamed Victory Aircraft in 1942 when the Canadian government took over ownership and management of the main plant. During World War II, Victory Aircraft built Avro (UK) aircraft: 3,197 Anson trainers, 430 Lancaster bombers, six Lancastrian, one Lincoln bomber and one York transport.

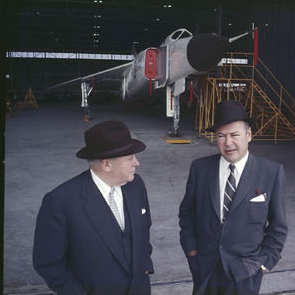
(L–R) Sir Roy Dobson and Crawford Gordon Jr. Note: Avro Arrow in background, c. 1957

=== Avro Canada ===
In 1944, an Advisory Committee on Aircraft Manufacture was established by the Canadian government. The Canadian Director of Aircraft Production wrote to Minister of Munitions and Supply C. D. Howe in 1944 to express that the establishment of a Canadian aircraft industry was of the "utmost importance to Canada", while UK-based Avro also established a company in 1944 searching for post-war opportunities. Bob Leckie of the Royal Canadian Air Force was a strong advocate, over many years, for a wholly domestic "end-to-end" industry that would design and build aircraft (and their engines) in Canada. However, according to Avro's Roy Dobson, the Department of National Defence gave "a cold reception" to doing anything more ambitious than the fabrication and assembly of aircraft designs and engines licensed from other companies.

Howe, as Minister of Reconstruction and Minister of Munitions and Supply (later Reconstruction and Supply), brokered a deal with Hawker Siddeley to take over the Victory Aircraft plant in 1945, with Frederick T. Smye hired by Hawker Siddeley's Roy Dobson as its first employee. Smye, born in Hamilton, Ontario, had risen through the ranks of the government's departments overseeing wartime aircraft production to become Assistant General Manager of Federal Aircraft Limited, the Crown Corporation managing production of the Avro Anson at the National Steel Car/Victory Aircraft plant.

In 1945, the UK-based Hawker Siddeley purchased Victory Aircraft from the Canadian government, creating A.V. Roe Canada Ltd. as the wholly owned Canadian branch of its aircraft manufacturing subsidiary, UK-based A.V. Roe and Company. Avro Canada began operations in the former Victory plant. Avro Aircraft (Canada), their first (and, at the time, only) division, turned to the repair and servicing of a number of World War II era aircraft, including Hawker Sea Fury fighters, North American B-25 Mitchell and Avro Lancaster bombers. From the outset, the company invested in research and development and embarked on an ambitious design program with a jet engine, a jet-powered fighter, and an airliner on the drawing boards.

=== Expansion and diversification ===
A.V. Roe Canada was restructured in 1954 as a holding company with two aviation subsidiaries: Avro Aircraft and Orenda Engines, which began operating under these names on 1 January 1955. Each company's facilities were located across from each other in a complex at the perimeter of Malton Airport (now known as Toronto Pearson International Airport). The total labour force of both aviation companies reached 15,000 in 1958.

During the same period, with Crawford Gordon as president, A.V. Roe Canada purchased a number of companies, including Dominion Steel and Coal Corporation, Canadian Car and Foundry (1957), and Canadian Steel Improvement. By 1958, A. V. Roe Canada Ltd. was an industrial giant with over 50,000 employees in a far-flung empire of 44 companies involved in coal mining, steel making, railway rolling stock, aircraft and aero-engine manufacturing, as well as computers and electronics. In 1956 the companies generated 45% of the revenue of the Hawker Siddeley Group. In 1958, annual sales revenue was approximately $450 million, ranking A.V. Roe Canada as the third largest corporation in Canada by capitalization. By the time of the cancellation of the Arrow and Iroquois, aircraft-related production amounted to approximately 40% of the company's activities with the balance composed of other industrial and commercial activities.

In 1956, 500,000 shares were issued to the public at a total value of $8 million. By 1958, 48% of the shares of A.V. Roe Canada were publicly traded on the stock exchange. Although controlled and largely owned by UK-based Hawker Siddeley Group, all profits from A.V. Roe Canada were retained within the company to fund development and growth. Management of the Canadian companies remained in Canadian hands.

=== Management team ===
- Fred Smye served as director of Canadian Aircraft Production during World War II and joined Federal Aircraft in Montreal (later Victory Aircraft) in 1944. When Hawker Siddeley purchased Victory Aircraft in 1945, Smye became the first employee of A.V. Roe Canada and later that year he became assistant general manager of Avro Aircraft. He later served as president of Canadian Applied Research and Canadian Steel Improvement.
- Crawford Gordon left the Department of Defence Production in 1951 to take over as President and General Manager of A. V. Roe Canada to assist with problems in development and production of the Avro Canada CF-100 Canuck. Gordon oversaw Avro Canada's restructuring and expansion during the 1950s into the third largest corporation in Canada.

== Avro Canada aircraft ==
=== CF-100 Canuck ===
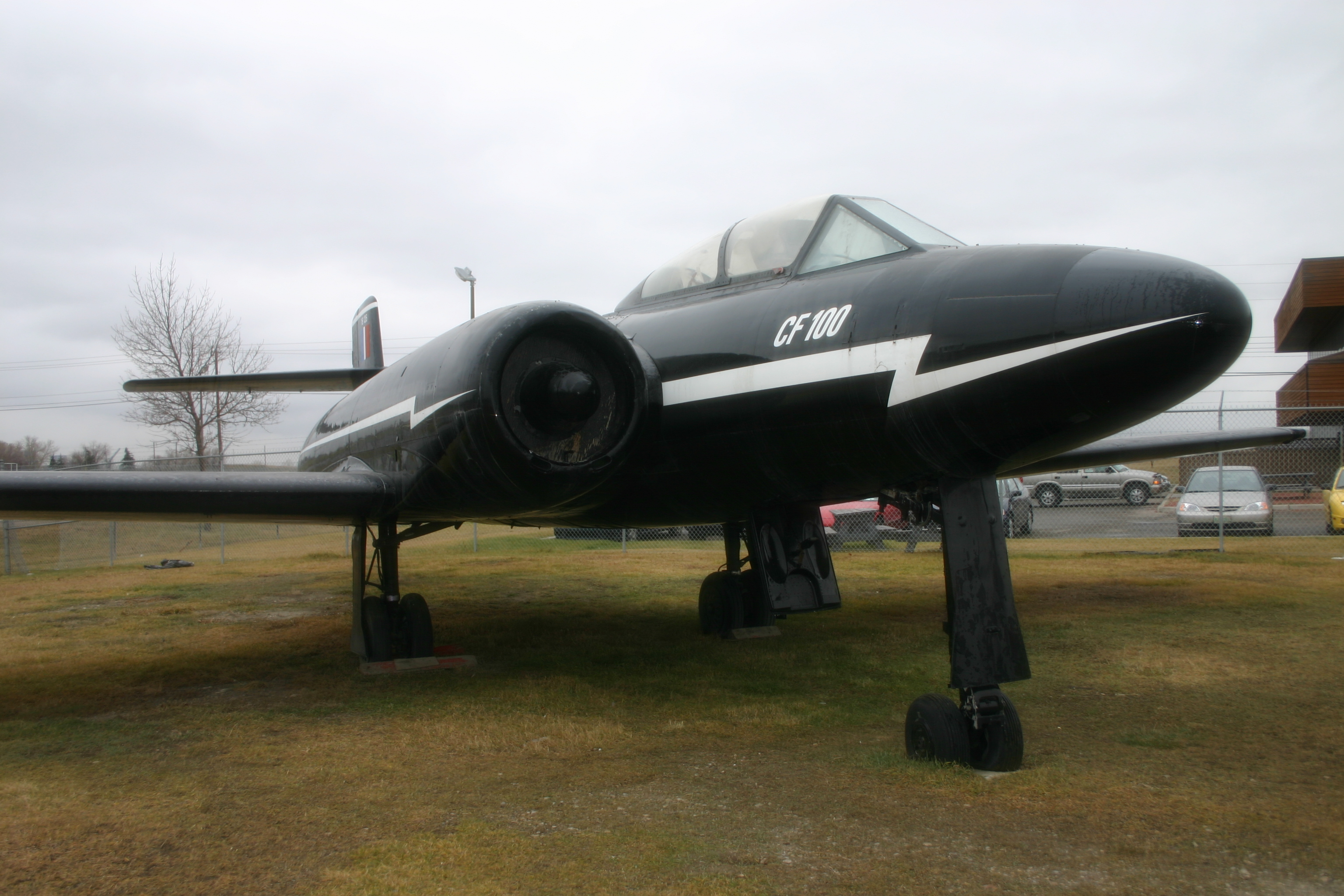
A CF-100 Mk 3 painted as the CF-100 prototype, on display at The Hangar Flight Museum, Calgary

In 1946, A.V. Roe Canada's next design, the Avro XC-100, Canada's first jet fighter, started at the end of the era of propeller-driven aircraft and the beginning of the jet age. Although the design of the large, jet-powered all-weather interceptor, renamed the CF-100 Canuck, was largely complete by the next year, the factory was not tooled for production until late 1948 due to ongoing repair and maintenance contracts. The CF-100 would have a long gestation period before finally entering RCAF service in 1952, initially with the Mk 2 and Mk 3 variants.

The CF-100 Canuck operated under NORAD to protect airspace from Soviet threats such as nuclear-armed bombers during all weather and day/night conditions. Although not designed for speeds over Mach 0.85, it was taken supersonic during a dive by test pilot Janusz Żurakowski in December 1952.

A small number of CF-100s served with the RCAF until 1981 in reconnaissance, training and electronic warfare (ECM) roles. In its lifetime, a total of 692 CF-100s of different variants, including 53 aircraft for the Belgian Air Force, were produced.

=== C102 Jetliner ===
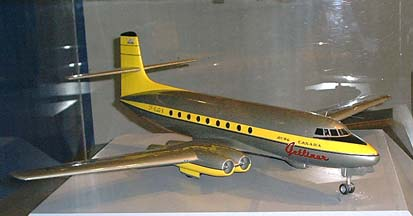
Model of the C102 Jetliner.

In the 1940s, work was also underway on a jet-powered civilian short- to medium-range transport known as the C102 Jetliner. It nearly became the first jet transport in the world when it first flew in August 1949, a mere 13 days following the first flight of the de Havilland Comet. The Jetliner represented a new type of regional jet airliner that would not see comparable designs until the late 1950s. An aggressive marketing campaign was directed at U.S. airlines and the USAF.

When the Rolls-Royce Avon AJ-65 engine was withdrawn from foreign markets by the British government, the design was modified to take four Derwent engines of higher weight and lower performance. The resulting design could no longer meet the operating range requirement of Trans-Canada Airlines (TCA). The sales prospects of the Jetliner floundered after the launch customer, TCA, withdrew from consideration of the four-engine variant. The American industrialist Howard Hughes even offered to start production under license.

The company was still attempting to get the CF-100 into production at the time and, consequently, the Canadian government cancelled any further work on the C102 due to Korean War priorities: C. D. Howe demanded the project be stopped to increase production of the CF-100, so the second C-102 prototype was scrapped in the plant in 1951, with the first relegated to photographic duties in the Flight Test Department. After a lengthy career as a camera platform and company "hack", CF-EJD-X was broken up in 1956. The nose section now resides in the Canada Aviation Museum in Ottawa.

=== CF-103 ===
In 1951, during production of the CF-100 Canuck, a design was explored for a revised version with swept wings and tail modifications. Known as the CF-103, it offered transonic performance with supersonic abilities in a dive. However, the basic CF-100 continued to improve through this period, greatly eroding the comparative advantages of the new design. It was considered an interim aircraft between the CF-100 and the more advanced C-104 project, and as such development did not progress beyond creation of a full-size wooden mock-up and separate cockpit.

=== C104 Advanced Fighter ===
By 1950, several design proposals for a supersonic interceptor were explored which included versions with swept wings, a tail-less delta wing (similar to the Dassault Mirage IV), side-body engine intakes, in-nose engine intakes (similar to the MiG-21), turbine engines and rocket engines, and combinations of several.

In 1952, two versions of a design for a delta-wing fighter known as C104 were submitted to the Royal Canadian Air Force: the single engine C104/4 and twin-engined C104/2. The designs were otherwise similar, using a low-mounted delta-wing; the primary advantages of the C104/2 were a larger overall size which offered a much larger internal weapons bay, and the added reliability afforded by the additional engine. Subsequent discussions between the RCAF and Avro examined a wide range of alternatives for a supersonic interceptor, culminating in RCAF "Specification AIR 7-3" in April 1953. Avro's response to the specification became the CF-105.

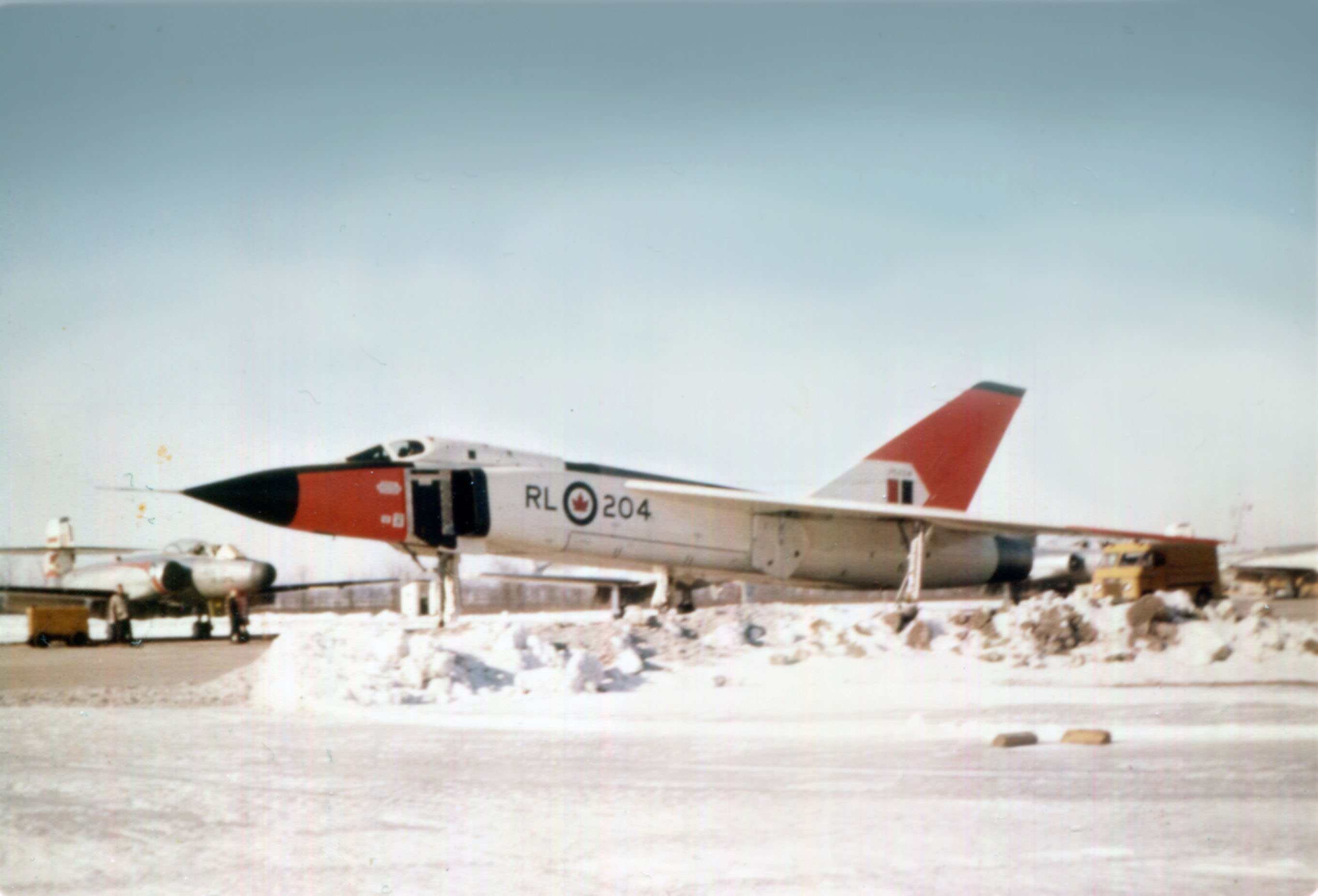
CF-105 Mk 1 interceptor

=== CF-105 Arrow Mk.1 and Mk.2 ===
The need for a newer and much more powerful interceptor aircraft was clear even before the CF-100 entered service. The CF-105 Arrow was rolled out on 4 October 1957, coincidentally the very same day the USSR launched Sputnik 1 into orbit, heralding the dawn of the space age and potentially the end of the Arrow's main target, the long-range bomber. The design was developed from the C104, with the delta wing raised to the top of the fuselage allowing for a simplified structure, easier access to the engines and the weapons bay in the belly, as well as a weapons bay larger than that of the B-24 Liberator or Lancaster bombers. The aircraft was very advanced, powerful, and broke numerous records. Many "firsts" were included, such as fly-by-wire technology, a new weapons fire control system, and the advanced Orenda Iroquois engine. The weapons were stored in an interchangeable pod in the internal weapons bay, allowing for ease of re-arming and switching from missiles to other kinds of weapons. Only the Mark 1 model (with lower-powered American engines) flew, including one that reached Mach 1.98. The first flight was on 25 March 1958. A total of five Mark 1 aircraft were completed, with several of the 29 Mark 2 models (with more powerful Iroquois engines) on the production line nearing completion. The sudden cancellation of the Arrow project by the Canadian government on 20 February 1959 led to a massive corporate downsizing and an attempt to further diversify. Many Avro Aircraft engineers who remained were reassigned to marine, truck and automobile projects. Numerous engineering and technical staff left Avro Canada primarily for the United Kingdom and the United States in a rapid "brain drain".

== Avro aircraft experimental designs ==
Additional developments of the Arrow were explored by Avro's Project Research Group under the leadership of Mario Pesando.

=== Arrow Mk.3 ===
Even before the Arrow first flew, Avro was designing a future version, the Mark 3. Originally designed for Mach 2.5, later revised to an estimated Mach 3 with a combat ceiling of 70,500 feet, it carried more fuel, weighed over 25% more than the Mk.2, and made greater use of CNC machining and high-temperature aluminium alloys. Also proposed was a heat shield forming an ablative insulation made from carbon fibre or fibreglass in a honeycomb matrix, later used on NASA's Mercury and Gemini programs. The engine was to be the Iroquois Mk.3, which Orenda estimated would provide 40,000 lbs of wet thrust (with afterburner). Images of the design show revised engine intakes projecting out from the fuselage to swallow the supersonic shock wave to reduce drag and increase thrust. Also proposed was capability for "probe and drogue" aerial refuelling made possible by the Arrow's revolutionary flight stability systems.

=== Long Range Arrow ===
In early 1957, studies began on how the Arrow Mk.2 might be developed into a "Long Range Arrow" to meet the requirements for the USAF's Long Range Interceptor Experimental (LRIX) program. This was thought to be suitable as under the terms of various agreements, statements, and promises to Allied and in particular Commonwealth nations, the U.S. would buy weapons from an ally if they were the best available and the Arrow seemed to fit this description. Shortly in advance of the USAF visiting Avro in 1955 to review the Arrow's development, a contract was granted to North American Aviation for design studies for the LRIX, designated the North American XF-108 Rapier. Performance requirements were for a range of 1,000 miles, Mach 3, and combat altitude of 60,000 feet. In September 1957, Avro's Project Studies PS-1 and PS-2 were released. PS-1 included addition of wingtip-mounted ramjets to supplement the main engines and a canard mounted above and behind the cockpit. PS-2 included wing extensions, an extended nose with retractable canard, two additional vertical stabilizers mounted on the wings, and four large ramjets. Estimated performance included sustained speeds of Mach 3 at 95,000 feet and vertical climb rate above 40,000 feet of Mach 2.5. The thrust-to-weight ratio would have been double the F-108 and over double the SR-71.

=== Arrow Mk.4 ===
At the request of USAF Chief Scientist, a less radical modification of the Arrow than the PS-2 was pursued which became the Mark 4. The revised intakes of the Mark 3 were retained, but with smaller Curtiss-Wright ramjets, without the canards and nose extension, and with a titanium skin instead of a heat shield. Performance was reduced to Mach 3 and maximum combat altitude of 80,000 feet.

=== Supersonic Avrodynes ===
In 1952, Avro Chief Designer John Frost selected a group of eight engineers and draftsmen to create the Avro Special Projects Group. In its intense exploration of radical aeronautical design ideas and development of new technology, as well as security, the SPG resembled Lockheed's "Skunk Works". Initial projects included research and development work on a series of "flying saucer"-like vehicles. The only design that materialized beyond mock-up was the VZ-9-AV Avrocar, funded entirely by the U.S. military from 1956.

- Project Y1: "the Spade"

Project Y mock-up in the Experimental Flight Hangar c. 1954.

Design reports from early 1952 outlined key features of a new gas turbine propelled engine and disc-shaped vehicle: an inner disc with central eye intake with an outer, counter-rotating disc, with rear-directed thrust nozzles, later refined to include controlling the aeroplane by thrust vectoring and stabilizing the vehicle by having the large engine rotor act as a gyroscope. The aircraft was designed for vertical take-off and landing which was thought to be hazardous and required an electronic flight-stabilization system, then not-yet available. Financed largely by Avro, the Canadian government deemed these problems too expensive to finance beyond an initial funding of $400,000. A USAF-led delegation to Avro in December 1953 gave Avro the opportunity to discuss their projects, but Y-1 was not deemed worthy of financing.

- Project Y2

In mid-1954, Frost proposed "Project Y-2: Flat Vertical Take-Off Gyroplane" in response to requests by the US Air Force and US Navy for "vertical rising point-defense fighters". In late 1954, the USAF purchased the development rights to this saucer-shaped VTOL vehicle powered by more conventional engines than, and designed to avoid many of the problems with, the Y-1. The USAF designated it Project MX-1794 and studies of the Avro saucer designs Project Silver Bug. Through 1958, Avro spent $2.5 million and the USAF $5.4 million funding the project. Numerous models were constructed and wind-tunnel testing was undertaken at MIT and Wright Patterson Air Force Base (where Roswell UFO studies were reportedly undertaken).

The design included eight Armstrong Siddeley Viper turbojet engines, a very large centre rotor/impeller with Lundstrom compressor turbines, with the cockpit mounted in the top/centre. Control was achieved through eight small exhausts at the outer edge, directed either through the top or bottom, in addition to the main turbine exhaust through the bottom/centre of the craft. A multi-engine test rig was built and tested in 1956, resulting in powerful thrust and a great deal of noise, and vibration. One Special Projects Group member reported that the prototype was secretly removed by the US Navy for further testing in California.

Avro also decided to internally fund development of a radial-flow gas turbine engine vehicle, designated PV-704, which proposed no central impeller or exhaust, but rather a large spinning turbo-disc directing all thrust to the outer rim. Funding enabled continued development but was insufficient for a prototype.

In 1957, the USAF provided additional funding to extend the project, by then highly classified and designated as Weapon System 606A. The concept developed was for a circular-winged, supersonic aircraft. Over 1,000 hours of wind-tunnel testing were performed. Drawings developed by Avro show an aircraft that appears to be a merging of flying saucer with more conventional fuselage shapes, in other words a tailless aircraft with circular wings (when viewed from above or below).

=== Avrocar ===
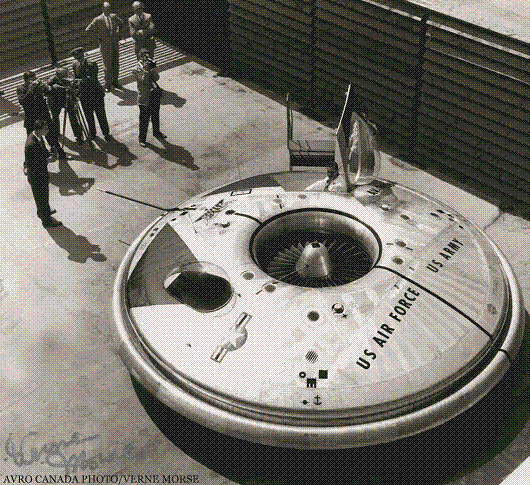
The Avro VZ-9-AV Avrocar.

The Avrocar, also called the Avro 'flying saucer' or Avro disc, was proposed to the U.S. Army as a type of "flying Jeep" that could also serve as a proof-of-concept test vehicle for a later supersonic flying saucer designs, PV-704 and Weapon System 606A. Two Avrocars were built, one for wind-tunnel testing at NASA Ames and the other for flight testing. The designs were underpowered and only operated in a ground-cushion effect, much like a hovercraft. When the Avrocar prototypes failed to perform at heights above three feet off the ground, the U.S. Army and USAF cancelled the project, in 1961.

Both Avrocars were on public display, one in Building 22 of the Smithsonian Paul E. Garber facility, the other at the U.S. Army Transportation Museum, Fort Eustis, Virginia. The latter Avrocar was dismantled and put into storage c. 2002, due to increasing deterioration (it was displayed outside, and the museum is very close to the ocean).

The curator of the U.S. Army Transportation Museum stated in 2008 that it would take between US$500,000 and US$600,000 to entirely restore it. Furthermore, because it is at a federal (military) installation, the work must be done by contractors, rather than volunteers. A grant of US$80,000 was received to begin restoration, however this amount was only enough to restore one piece approximately five ft by five ft.

=== Space Threshold Vehicle ===
Developed by the Advanced Projects Group, a June 1958 report by Avro's Engineering Department described a Space Threshold Vehicle intended to "get a man into the threshold of space and recover him, flying back through the corridor", where winged flight was possible between maximum altitude that could sustain lift from a winged vehicle and maximum tolerable structural temperature. This was estimated to be an altitude of between 150,000 and 200,000 feet. The STV would have had capability for in-flight refueling, and an expected speed of 6,000 mph (Mach 8.5+).

Avro's computer capacities provided capability in developing theories and methods similar to modern three-dimensional modeling of fluid dynamics. Avro envisioned a delta-shaped vehicle with downward winglets (similar to the TSR-2's), varying engine nacelle positions, titanium skin, and first flight of a research vehicle in 1962. Many engineers involved in this and similar Avro designs were later heavily involved in NASA Projects Mercury, Gemini, and Apollo.

=== Avroskimmer ===
This group of vehicle designs were variations on what later became known as hovercraft.

- Avrocruisier
- Avrowagon
- Avroflivver
- Avro P470 Mobile Ground Effect Vehicle

=== Other designs ===
- Avro Canada TS-140, A Mach-2 VTOL fighter proposed to the US Navy.
- XA-20 and XA-92 Bobcat, similar to designs for later armoured tracked vehicles.
- Turbine-powered trucks, monorail transit.
- Orenda OT-4 turbine powered White 7000 transport truck with an Allison engine.
- Orenda OT-4 turbine powered M-48 Patton tank. The American M1 Abrams would be the first main battle tank in production (1980) powered by a turbine engine.
- Hydrofoil Warships: When the Arrow and related programs were terminated, 12 key engineers from this team departed for De Havilland Aircraft of Canada. to work on what became HMCS Bras d'Or, possibly the world's fastest warship to present day (2011).

== Orenda Engines ==
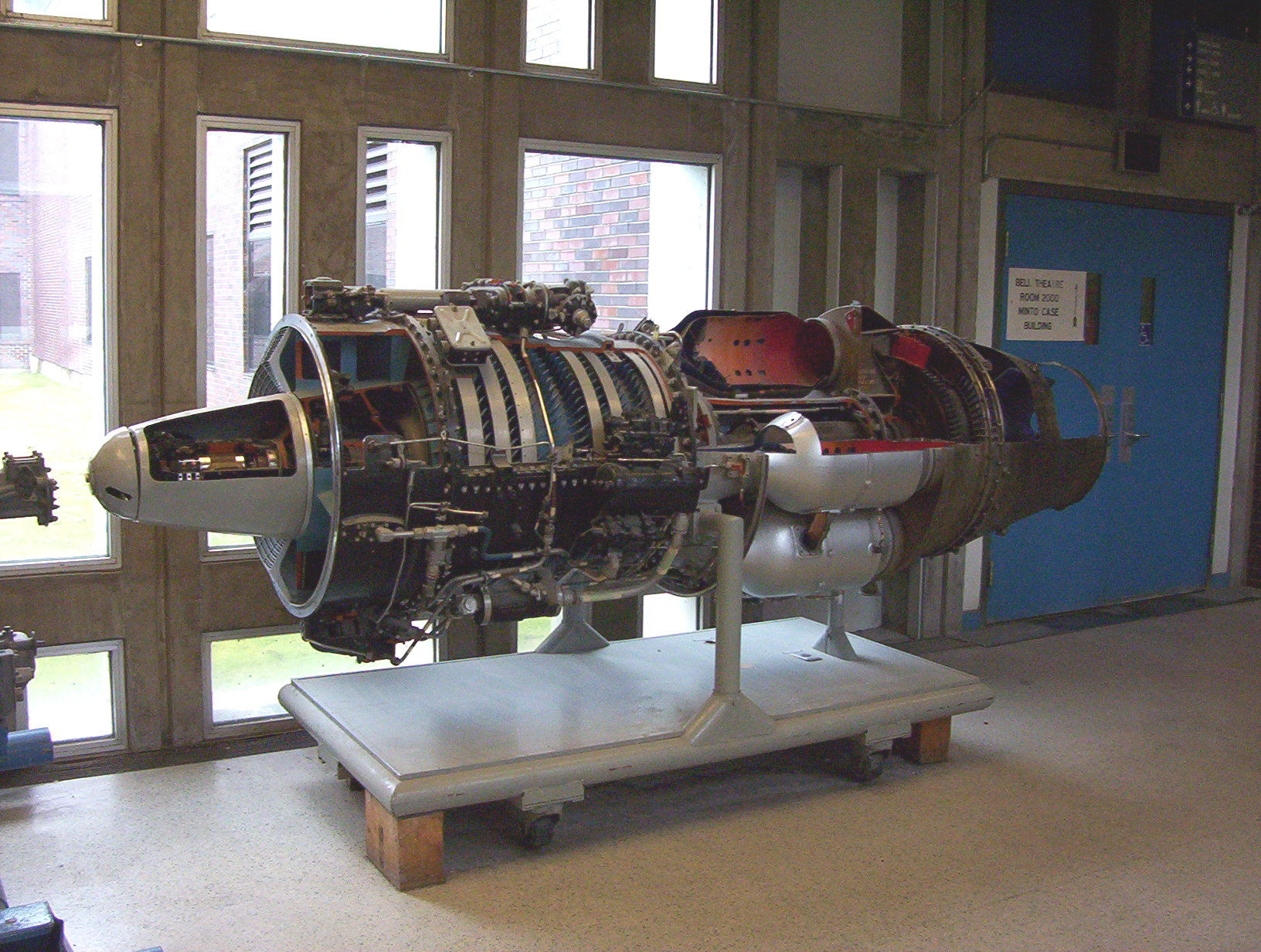
Orenda engine on display at Carleton University

Founded in 1944 as crown corporation Turbo Research, it was established to conduct research and cold-weather testing of jet engines for the Royal Canadian Air Force during World War II. Initial studies were undertaken into centrifugal-flow engine design, which later were eclipsed by a new axial-flow design, the TR.4, later known as the Chinook, the first Canadian-designed jet engine. In 1948, Turbo Research was sold to A.V. Roe Canada. and merged with its Gas Turbine Division. The Chinook was developed into the TR.5 Orenda designed for the CF-100 Canuck, but was also installed in several variants of the Canadair Sabre.

In 1954 Avro Canada was re-organized and the Gas Turbine Division became Orenda Engines. To power the CF-105 Arrow supersonic interceptor, Orenda developed the PS.13 Iroquois engine between 1953 and 1954. The Iroquois program was cancelled, along with the Arrow, on 20 February 1959. The company continued building jet engines, under licence, for the Royal Canadian Air Force from Avro and Canadair in the 1960s. In 1962, it was transferred to Hawker Siddeley Canada and continued as a major repair and overhaul business. In the 1980s Orenda was purchased by Magellan Aerospace, which is now known as Magellan Repair, Overhaul & Industrial.

== Canadian Steel Improvement ==
In 1951, Canadian Steel Improvement. was established. When the Korean War broke out in 1950, the Canadian Defense Production Ministry initiated establishment of a turbine and compressor blade production forge plant, with The Steel Improvement and Forge Company being the successful bidder. Plant construction and operation started in 1951 in Etobicoke, a Toronto suburb near Malton, Ontario. Steel Improvement provided the necessary technical and management expertise and the Canadian government funded construction of the plant, which was leased to Steel Improvement. In its first year, the plant produced more than a million precision forged turbine and compressor blades for Avro's Orenda engine.

In 1954, the Canadian government decided to sell the plant and Avro Canada agreed to purchase it to maintain production of the Orenda and Iroquois engines. The company employed over 400 in the production of precision forgings, blades, jet engine components, close-tolerance forging, and operation of aluminum and magnesium foundries.

== Canadian Car & Foundry ==
In 1955, Canadian Car and Foundry was purchased by A.V. Roe Canada. In 1957, its foundry division was spun off as Canadian Steel Foundries. The company produced rail car rolling stock, streetcars for most large Canadian cities as well as the Brazilian cities of Rio de Janeiro and São Paulo, and the Canadian Car-Brill buses and trolleys. It also controlled Canadian General Transit, a supplier of railway tank cars for petroleum and chemical transport.

== DOSCO ==
DOSCO was one of the largest private employers in Canada when it was purchased as a subsidiary of A.V. Roe Canada. The company was dissolved in 1968 after the majority of its coal mining and steel mill industrial assets in Industrial Cape Breton were expropriated and nationalized by the federal and provincial governments (see Sydney Steel Corporation and DEVCO). Other subsidiaries included mining, engineering, shipping, rail car manufacturing and shipbuilding:

- Halifax Shipyards
- Cumberland Railway and Coal Company
- Sydney & Louisburg Railway, an historic railway in Cape Breton Island, NS.

== Canadian Applied Research ==
In 1957, A.V. Roe Canada acquired PSC Applied Research, a manufacturer of flight navigation computers, and renamed it Canadian Applied Research. It was later divested by Hawker Siddeley Canada and merged with de Havilland Canada's Special Products division to form SPAR Aerospace (Special Products and Applied Research), developer of the Canadarm remote manipulator system for the Space Shuttle. It is today a part of MacDonald Dettwiler as MD Robotics, a subsidiary of its MDA Space Missions division.

== Other subsidiaries ==
- Algoma Steel, minority ownership, acquired in 1957, divested in 1958.
- Canadian Steel Wheel (Associated Company), existed from 1957 to 1975
- Canadian Thermo Control Co existed from 1957 to 1983

== Aircraft ==
Product list and details
| Type | Aircraft | Description | Capacity | Launch date | 1st flight | 1st delivery | Production |
| C-100 | Avro CF-100 Canuck | Fighter interceptor | 2 crew | 1946 | 1950 | 1952 | 692 from Mk 1 to Mk 5 series |
| C-101 | - | Twin-engined navigation trainer | - | - | - | - | Abandoned project |
| C-102 | Avro C102 Jetliner | Prototype medium-range jet airliner | 36 passengers | 1946 | 1949 | Never entered production | One flying prototype, one broken up |
| C-103 | Avro CF-103 | Transonic fighter | 2 | n/a | n/a | Cancelled in 1951 | Only a wooden mock-up constructed |
| C-104 | - | All-weather interceptor | 2 | 1950s | - | - | Not built after C-105 chosen |
| C-105 | Avro CF-105 Arrow | Delta-wing supersonic interceptor aircraft | 2 | 1950s | 1958 | Cancelled during production run | Five Mk 1 flown, (29 Mk 2 airframes in production) |
| | Avro Canada TS-140 | Fighter | 1 pilot | n/a | n/a | n/a | n/a |
| Model 1 | Avro VZ-9-AV Avrocar | Experimental VTOL | 2 | 1950s | 1959 | Cancelled while in test phase in 1961 | Two prototypes (second prototype test flown) |

== Corporate demise ==
In 1962, Hawker Siddeley dissolved A.V. Roe Canada and transferred all A.V. Roe Canada assets to its newly formed subsidiary Hawker Siddeley Canada. Avro Aircraft was closed.

Hawker Siddeley Canada, at that time, among its diverse holdings, included major manufacturing units:

- Canadian Car and Foundry (CC&F)
- Dominion Steel and Coal Corporation (DOSCO)
- Orenda Engines

The former Avro aircraft factory in Malton was sold to de Havilland Canada in the same year. This facility located on the north end of Toronto Pearson International Airport (the village of Malton was incorporated into the City of Mississauga in 1974), was subsequently owned and operated by several others:

- Douglas Aircraft of Canada (1963–1967): manufacturer of the aircraft wings and tail sections (empennage) for the Douglas DC-9;
- McDonnell-Douglas Canada (1967–1997): manufacturer of aircraft wings and related components for the KC-10 and MD-11, MD-80 wings, empennage and cabin floors, and McDonnell Douglas F/A-18 Hornet side panels and pylons;
- Boeing Toronto (1997–2005): manufacturer of Boeing 717 wings, parts for the Delta rocket, the Boeing C-17 transport and the Boeing 737 jetliner.

By the late 1990s, Hawker Siddeley Canada had been diminished into a holding company after divesting itself of almost everything other than its pension fund. One of Hawker Siddeley Canada's last aerospace concerns the aircraft gas turbine repair and overhaul company Standard Aero of Winnipeg was spun off to British Tire and Rubber at the time (it is now part of Dubai Aerospace Enterprises, an international corporation with interests in aircraft leasing, MRO and aviation IT solutions).

DOSCO's assets were nationalized to become DEVCO and SYSCO. CC&F closed its operations and the plants demolished. CC&F's Thunder Bay plant, after several changes of ownership, is now part of Bombardier Aerospace.

Orenda Aerospace, as part of the Magellan Aerospace Corporation, is the only remaining original company from the A.V. Roe empire, although greatly diminished in both the size and scope of its operations.

In mid-2005, with the completion of the last shipset of Boeing 717 wings, The Boeing Company discontinued its operations at the former Avro plant. (Note: Referring to the article's last paragraph: "Note: ... On August 12, 2005 the last few CAW [union] Local 1967 represented employees, walked out the plant gates for the last time.")

The Malton plant, which had comprised several very large buildings and hangar-like structures, was demolished in progressive stages from 2004 onwards. The approximate 113 acres (46 ha) of land that the plant resided on at the time of its closure was sold to the Greater Toronto Airports Authority (owner of the Toronto Pearson International Airport) and the title was transferred after the property site had completed its environmental soil remediation.

Some of the brickwork of the site's historic main "C" assembly building, next to the high-bay doors that the Arrow, Jetliner, CF-100 and thousands of other aircraft and major assemblies emerged from, was retained by the former Canadian Air and Space Museum in Downsview, Toronto, for future use alongside a number of their Avro displays, which include a full-scale replica of the CF-105 Arrow.

== Leadership ==
=== President ===
1. Sir Roy Hardy Dobson, 1 September 1945 – 15 October 1951
2. Crawford Gordon Jr., 15 October 1951 – 2 July 1959
3. Sir Roy Hardy Dobson (acting), 2 July 1959 – 23 August 1961
4. Theodore Jonathan Emmert, 23 August 1961 – 1 May 1962

=== Chairman of the Board ===
1. John Paris Bickell, 1 September 1945 – 22 August 1951 †
2. Sir Roy Hardy Dobson, 15 October 1951 – 1 May 1962

== Bibliography ==
- Campagna, Palmiro. Storms of Controversy: The Secret Avro Arrow Files Revealed, Third Paperback Edition. Toronto: Stoddart, 1998. ISBN 0-7737-5990-5.
- Campagna, Palmiro. Requiem for a Giant: A.V. Roe Canada and the Avro Arrow. Toronto: Dundurn Press, 2003. ISBN 1-55002-438-8.
- Dow, James. The Arrow. Toronto: James Lorimer and Company Publishers, 1979. ISBN 0-88862-282-1.
- Floyd, Jim. The Avro Canada C102 Jetliner. Erin, Ontario: Boston Mills Press, 1986. ISBN 0-919783-66-X.
- Gainor, Chris. Arrows to the Moon: Avro's Engineers and the Space Race. Burlington, Ontario: Apogee, 2001. ISBN 1-896522-83-1.
- Page, Ron, Richard Organ, Don Watson and Les Wilkinson (The "Arrowheads"). Avro Arrow: The Story of the Avro Arrow from its Evolution to its Extinction. Erin, Ontario: Boston Mills Press, 1979, reprinted Stoddart, 2004. ISBN 1-55046-047-1.
- Park, Libby and Frank Park. Anatomy of Big Business. Toronto: James Lorimer & Company, 1973. ISBN 978-0-88862-040-8.
- Peden, Murray. Fall of an Arrow. Toronto: Stoddart Publishing, 1987. ISBN 0-7737-5105-X.
- Shaw, E.K. There Never was an Arrow. Toronto: Steel Rail Educational Publishing, 1979. ISBN 0-88791-025-4.
- Stewart, Greig. Arrow Through the Heart: The Life and Times of Crawford Gordon and the Avro Arrow. Toronto: McGraw-Hill-Ryerson, 1998. ISBN 0-07-560102-8.
- Stewart, Greig. Shutting Down the National Dream: A.V. Roe and the Tragedy of the Avro Arrow. Toronto: McGraw-Hill-Ryerson, 1991. ISBN 0-07-551119-3.
- Whitcomb, Randall. Avro Aircraft and Cold War Aviation. St. Catharine's, Ontario: Vanwell, 2002. ISBN 1-55125-082-9.
- Whitcomb, Randall. Cold War Tech War. The Politics Of America's Air Defense. Burlington, Ontario: Apogee Books, 2008. ISBN 978-1894959-759.
- Zuk, Bill. The Avro Arrow Story: The Impossible Dream. Calgary: Altitude Publishing, 2006. ISBN 1-55439-703-0.
- Zuk, Bill. Avrocar: Canada's Flying Saucer: The Story of Avro Canada's Secret Projects. Erin, Ontario: Boston Mills Press, 2001. ISBN 1-55046-359-4.
- Zuuring, Peter. The Arrow Scrapbook. Kingston, Ontario: Arrow Alliance Press, 1999. ISBN 1-55056-690-3.
- Zuuring, Peter. Iroquois Rollout. Kingston, Ontario: Arrow Alliance Press, 2002. ISBN 1-55056-906-6.
