= Victory Aircraft =

Canadian aircraft manufacturer

Victory Aircraft Limited
- Industry: Aerospace
- Founded: 1942
- Defunct: 1945
- Fate: Sold to Hawker Siddeley Group
- Successor: Avro Canada
- Headquarters: Canada
- Key people: J.P. Bickell, President
- Products: Military aircraft

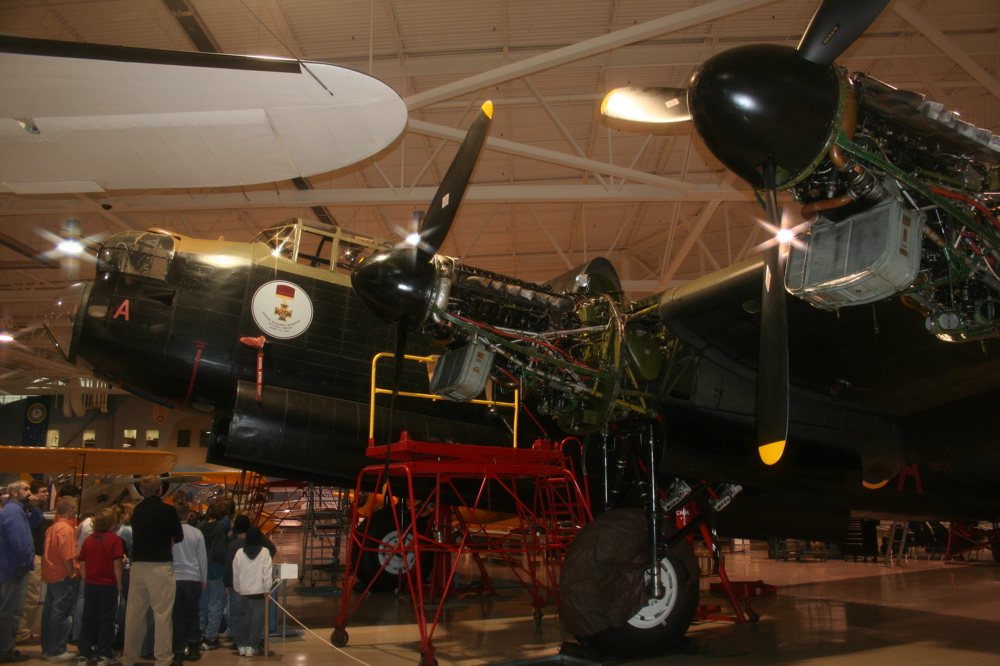
Victory Aircraft Lancaster X, named the "Mynarski Memorial Lancaster"

Victory Aircraft Limited was a Canadian manufacturing company that, during the Second World War, built mainly British-designed aircraft under licence. It acted as a shadow factory, safe from the reach of German bombers.

Initially the major wartime contract to manufacture Avro Lancaster heavy bombers was to go to the National Steel Car Ltd. headquartered in Hamilton, utilizing the Malton factory (near today's Toronto Pearson International Airport). National Steel Car was already producing Westland Lysander aircraft (Malton 1938–1939) and involved as a subcontractor in the manufacture of Hawker Hurricane fighters (1939-1943), Avro Anson trainers (Montreal 1941–1945) and Handley Page Hampden bombers (Malton and Montreal 1939-1941?). Questions arising as to the company's ability to manage the project led to the government's expropriation of the plant on 4 November 1942 and the setting up of the Crown Corporation, Victory Aircraft Limited, incorporated under the Department of Munitions and Supply Act, 1940 c.31. J.P. Bickell, one of C.D. Howe's "dollar-a-year men" headed Victory Aircraft Ltd. as president and chairman of the board.

== Wartime production ==
Although originally designated to produce the Martin B-26 Marauder medium bomber, the Malton plant received a contract on 18 September 1941 to build the Avro Lancaster Mk X heavy bomber. When the first drawings arrived in January 1942, the complexity of the project seemed daunting. Some 500,000 manufacturing operations were involved in manufacturing over 55,000 separate components that went into a Lancaster (excluding engines and turrets and small items such as rivets, nuts and bolts).

== Avro Lancaster X ==
A Lancaster Mk I (R5727) from Avro Aircraft (UK) was flown across the Atlantic in August 1942, to act as a "pattern" aircraft for production. Differences between the British Lancasters and the Canadian built versions (known as the Mk X) revolved around engines, instruments and radio equipment being manufactured in Canada or the United States instead of England. The Rolls-Royce Merlin engines were the same design, but manufactured by Packard in the United States. A later series Lancaster Mk X replaced the original Frazer-Nash FN 50 mid-upper turret with a US-made Martin 250CE turret moved to a new location further forward on the upper fuselage due to differences in weight between that unit and the original turret. All major sub-assemblies of the Canadian Lancasters were interchangeable with the British versions so that in the event of damage, spare parts were immediately at hand.

Initially, all components were built at Malton except for the bomb doors, flaps, ailerons and elevators, that were produced by Ottawa Car & Aircraft Ltd. Later, more of the parts were subcontracted out with Canadian General Electric Co. Ltd. of Toronto constructing the fuel tanks, tailplane, fins and rudders, while the outer wings were subcontracted to the Fleet Aircraft Limited plant in Fort Erie, Ontario.

From the first blueprints arriving to the first test flight took only 16 months, an impressive accomplishment, not lost on Avro (UK) management. The Malton work force climbed from 3,300 (1942) to 9,521 in 1944, most of them initially unskilled workers and about a quarter of them women. Almost exactly a year to the day from when the "pattern" aircraft was flown to Canada, the Canadian prototype, (serial number KB700), rolled off the Victory Aircraft assembly line on 1 August 1943. Named the "Ruhr Express," much publicity was made of its christening, first flight and its departure (albeit delayed as the prototype was wheeled out missing some of its essential gear and was barely able to fly) to England. Nevertheless, the Avro Lancaster setting off for war was an occasion for which the country could be proud.

Eventually, Lancaster production at Victory Aircraft Ltd. reached the impressive mark of one aircraft per day. After being ferried to England and sent to operational squadrons, the Canadian "Lancs" were assigned to No. 6 Group RCAF, the Canadian component of RAF Bomber Command, to complete this "all-Canadian" contribution to the war effort. The Lancaster X was also slated to equip the RCAF bomber squadrons for the British Commonwealth Tiger Force for the bombing of Japan however the war with Japan ended before the force was sent overseas. The Malton plant went on to build by war's end, a total of 3,629 Avro aircraft: 3,197 Ansons, 430 Mk X Lancasters (including six Lancastrian transport conversions), one Mk XV Lincoln heavy bomber, and a single York transport.

== End of Victory Aircraft ==
Victory Aircraft ceased operations on 11 November 1945. In 1945, the Canadian government sold Victory Aircraft to Hawker Siddeley Group who used it for their subsidiary A.V. Roe Canada Ltd (known as Avro Canada).

Product list and details (date information from Victory)
| Aircraft | Description | Seats | Launch date | 1st flight | 1st delivery | Number produced | Scheduled to cease production |
|---|---|---|---|---|---|---|---|
| Avro Anson | Twin-engined bomber/trainer | Crew of two | | 1936 | | 3197 | 1945 |
| Avro Lancaster Mk X | Four-engined heavy bomber | Crew of seven | 1941 | 1943 | 1945 | 430 | 1945 |
| Avro Lancastrian | Four-engined transport | Crew of five, nine passengers | | 1943 | | 6 | 1945 |
| Avro Lincoln Mk. XV | Four-engined heavy bomber | Crew of seven | 1944 | 1944 | 1945 | 1 | 1945 |
| Avro York C.1 (Special) | Four-engined transport | Crew of two, 24 passengers | | 1942 | 1945 | 1 | 1945 |

== See also ==
- History of aviation in Canada
