= Avro Canada CF-105 Arrow =

Canadian interceptor aircraft family

CF-105 Arrow
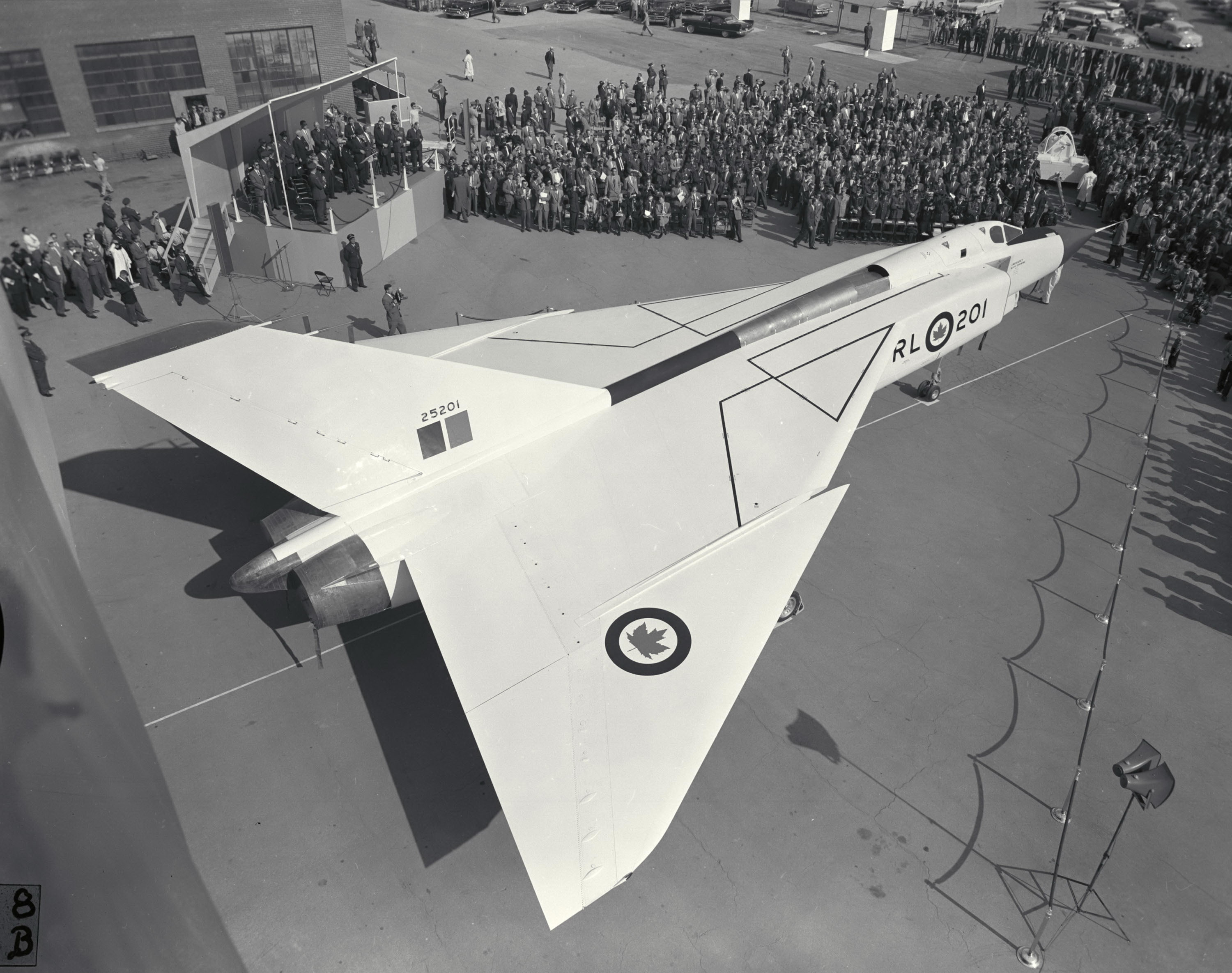
- Rollout of the first CF-105 Arrow

General information
- Type: Interceptor
- National origin: Canada
- Manufacturer: Avro Canada
- Status: Cancelled (20 February 1959)
- Primary user: Royal Canadian Air Force
- Number built: 5

History
- Manufactured: 1957–1959 (design work began in 1953)
- First flight: 25 March 1958

The Avro Canada CF-105 Arrow was an interceptor aircraft designed and built by Avro Canada. The CF-105 held the promise of Mach 2 speeds at altitudes exceeding 50,000 feet (15,000 m) and was intended to serve as the Royal Canadian Air Force's (RCAF) primary interceptor into the 1960s and beyond.

The Arrow was the culmination of a series of design studies begun in 1953 that examined improved versions of the Avro Canada CF-100 Canuck. After considerable study, the RCAF selected a dramatically more powerful delta-winged design, and serious development began in March 1955. The aircraft was intended to be built directly from the production line, skipping the traditional hand-built prototype phase. The first Arrow Mk. 1, RL-201, was rolled out to the public on 4 October 1957, the same day as the launch of Sputnik I.

Flight testing began with RL-201 on 25 March 1958, and the design quickly demonstrated excellent handling and overall performance, reaching Mach 1.9 in level flight. Powered by the Pratt & Whitney J75, another four Mk. 1s were completed, RL-202, RL-203, RL-204 and RL-205. The lighter and more powerful Orenda Iroquois engine was soon ready for testing, and the first Mk 2 with the Iroquois, RL-206, was ready for taxi testing in preparation for flight and acceptance tests by RCAF pilots by early 1959. Canada tried to sell the Arrow to the US and Britain, but no agreements were concluded.

On 20 February 1959, Prime Minister John Diefenbaker abruptly halted the development of both the Arrow and its Iroquois engines before the scheduled project review to evaluate the program could be held. Two months later the assembly line, tooling, plans, existing airframes, and engines were ordered to be destroyed. The cancellation was the topic of considerable political controversy at the time, and the subsequent destruction of the aircraft in production remains a topic for debate among historians and industry pundits. "This action effectively put Avro out of business and its highly skilled engineering and production personnel scattered".

== Design and development ==
=== Background ===
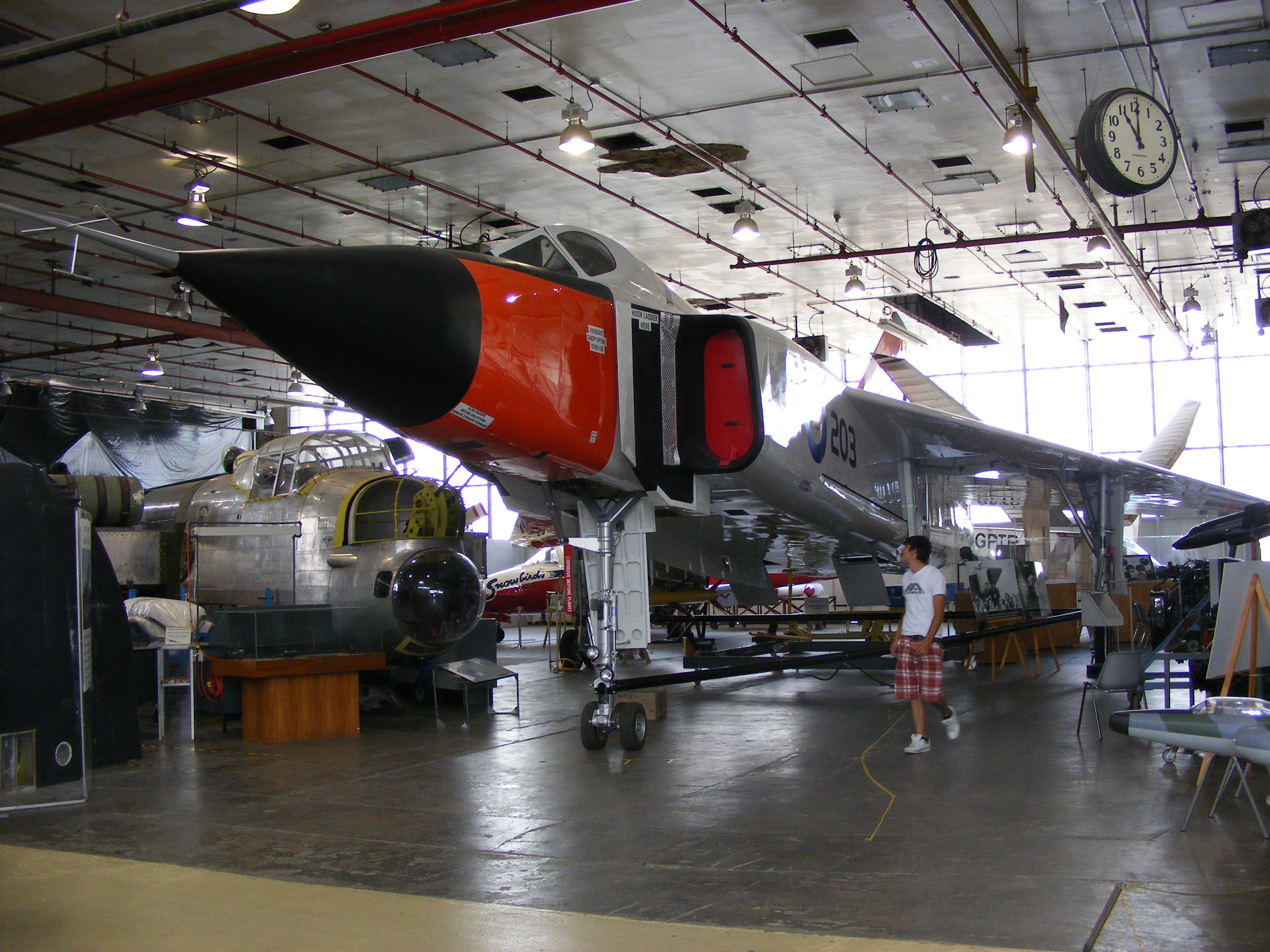
Full size replica of the CF-105 Arrow at the Canadian Air and Space Museum, Toronto

In the post-Second World War period, the Soviet Union began developing a capable fleet of long-range bombers with the ability to deliver nuclear weapons across North America and Europe. The main threat was principally from high-speed, high-altitude bombing runs launched from the Soviet Union travelling over the Arctic against military bases and built-up industrial centres in Canada and the United States. To counter this threat, Western countries developed interceptors that could engage and destroy these bombers before they reached their targets.

A. V. Roe Canada Limited had been set up as a subsidiary of the Hawker Siddeley Group in 1945, initially handling repair and maintenance work for aircraft at the Malton, Ontario, Airport, today known as Toronto Pearson International Airport. The next year the company began the design of Canada's first jet fighter for the Royal Canadian Air Force (RCAF), the Avro CF-100 Canuck all-weather interceptor. The Canuck underwent a lengthy and troubled prototype stage before entering service seven years later in 1953. Nevertheless, it went on to become one of the most enduring aircraft of its class, serving in a variety of roles until 1981.

Recognizing that the delays that affected the development and deployment of the CF-100 could also affect its successor, and that the Soviets were working on newer jet-powered bombers that would render the CF-100 ineffective, the RCAF began looking for a supersonic, missile-armed successor for the Canuck even before it had entered service. In March 1952, the RCAF's Final Report of the All-Weather Interceptor Requirements Team was submitted to Avro Canada.

=== Higher speeds ===
Avro engineering had been considering supersonic issues already at this point. Supersonic flight works in a very different fashion and presents a number of new problems. One of the most critical, and surprising, was the sudden onset of a new form of drag, known as wave drag. The effects of wave drag were so strong that engines of the era could not provide enough power to overcome it, leading to the concept of a "sound barrier".

German research during the Second World War had shown the onset of wave drag was greatly reduced by using airfoils that varied in curvature as gradually as possible. This suggested the use of thinner airfoils with much longer chord than designers would have used on subsonic aircraft. These designs were impractical because they left little internal room in the wing for armament or fuel.

The Germans also discovered it was possible to "trick" the airflow into the same behaviour if a conventional thicker airfoil was used swept rearward at a sharp angle, creating a swept wing. This provided many of the advantages of a thinner airfoil while also retaining the internal space needed for strength and fuel storage. Another advantage was that the wings were clear of the supersonic shock wave generated by the nose of the aircraft.

Almost every fighter project in the postwar era immediately applied the concept, which started appearing on production fighters in the late 1940s. Avro engineers explored swept-wing and tail modifications to the CF-100 known as the CF-103, which had proceeded to wooden mock-up stage. The CF-103 offered improved transonic performance with supersonic abilities in a dive. The basic CF-100 continued to improve through this period, and the advantages were continually eroded. When a CF-100 broke the sound barrier on 18 December 1952, interest in the CF-103 waned.

=== Delta wings ===
At the time we laid down the design of the CF-105, there was a somewhat emotional controversy going on in the United States on the relative merits of the delta plan form versus the straight wing for supersonic aircraft ... our choice of a tailless delta was based mainly on the compromise of attempting to achieve structural and aero elastic efficiency, with a very thin wing, and yet, at the same time, achieving the large internal fuel capacity required for the specified range.

— Designer James C. Floyd

Another solution to the high-speed problem is the delta wing. The delta wing had many of the same advantages of the swept wing in terms of transonic and supersonic performance, but offered much more internal room and overall surface area. This provided more room for fuel, an important consideration given the inefficient early jet engines of the era, and the large wing area provided ample lift at high altitudes. The delta wing also enabled slower landings than swept wings in certain conditions.

The disadvantages of the design were increased drag at lower speeds and altitudes, and especially higher drag while maneuvering. For the interceptor role these were minor concerns, as the aircraft would be spending most of its time flying in straight lines at high altitudes and speeds, mitigating these disadvantages.

Further proposals based on the delta wing resulted in two versions of the design known as C104: the single engine C104/4 and twin-engined C104/2. The designs were otherwise similar, using a low-mounted delta-wing and sharply raked vertical stabilizer. The primary advantages of the C104/2 were its twin-engine reliability and a larger overall size, which offered a much larger internal weapons bay. The proposals were submitted to the RCAF in June 1952.

=== AIR 7-3 and C105 ===
Intensive discussions between Avro and the RCAF examined a wide range of alternative sizes and configurations for a supersonic interceptor, culminating in RCAF Specification AIR 7-3 in April 1953. AIR 7-3 called specifically for a two crew, twin engine, aircraft with a range of 300 nautical miles (556 km) for a normal low-speed mission, and 200 nmi (370 km) for a high-speed interception mission. It also specified operation from a 6,000 ft (1,830 m) runway; a Mach 1.5 cruising speed at an altitude of 70,000 ft (21,000 m); and manoeuvrability for 2 g turns with no loss of speed or altitude at Mach 1.5 and 50,000 ft. The specification required five minutes from starting the aircraft's engines to reaching 50,000 ft altitude and Mach 1.5. It was also to have turn-around time on the ground of less than 10 minutes. An RCAF team led by Ray Foottit visited US aircraft producers and surveyed British and French manufacturers, concluding that no existing or planned aircraft satisfied these requirements.

In 1955 Avro estimated the performance of the Arrow Mk 2 (with Iroquois) as follows, from the January 1955 British evaluation titled Evaluation of the CF.105 as an All Weather Fighter for the RAF: "Max speed Mach 1.9 at 50,000 ft, Combat speed of Mach 1.5 at 50,000 feet and 1.84 g without bleeding energy, time to 50,000 ft of 4.1 minutes, 500-foot per minute climb ceiling of 62,000 feet, 400 nmi radius on a high-speeds mission, 630 nmi radius on a low-speed mission, Ferry range is not given, but estimated at 1,500 nmi."

Avro submitted their modified C105 design in May 1953, essentially a two-man version of the C104/2. A change to a "shoulder-mounted" wing allowed rapid access to the aircraft's internals, weapons bay, and engines. The new design also allowed the wing to be built as a single structure sitting on the upper fuselage, simplifying construction and improving strength. The wing design and positioning required a long main landing gear that still had to fit within the thin delta wing, presenting an engineering challenge. Five different wing sizes were outlined in the report, ranging between 1,000 ft^{2} and 1,400 ft^{2} (93 m^{2} to 130 m^{2}); the 1,200 ft^{2} (111 m^{2}) sized version was eventually selected.

The primary engine selection was the Rolls-Royce RB.106, an advanced two-spool design offering around 21,000 pounds-force (93 kN). Backup designs were the Bristol Olympus OL-3, the US-built Curtiss-Wright J67 version of the OL-3, or the Orenda TR.9 engines.

Armament was stored in a large internal bay located in a "belly" position, taking up over one third of the fuselage. A wide variety of weapons could be deployed from this bay, such as the Hughes Falcon guided missile, the CARDE Velvet Glove air-to-air missile, or four general-purpose 1,000 lb bombs. The Velvet Glove radar-guided missile had been under development with the RCAF for some time, but was believed unsuitable for supersonic speeds and lacked development potential. Consequently, further work on that project was cancelled in 1956.

In July 1953, the proposal was accepted and Avro was given the go-ahead to start a full design study under the project name "CF-105". In December, CA$27 million was provided to start flight modelling. At first, the project was limited in scope, but the introduction of the Soviet Myasishchev M-4 Bison jet bomber and the Soviet Union's testing of a hydrogen bomb the next month dramatically changed Cold War priorities. In March 1955, the contract was upgraded to CA$260 million for five Arrow Mk.1 flight-test aircraft, to be followed by 35 Arrow Mk. 2s with production engines and fire-control systems.

=== Production ===
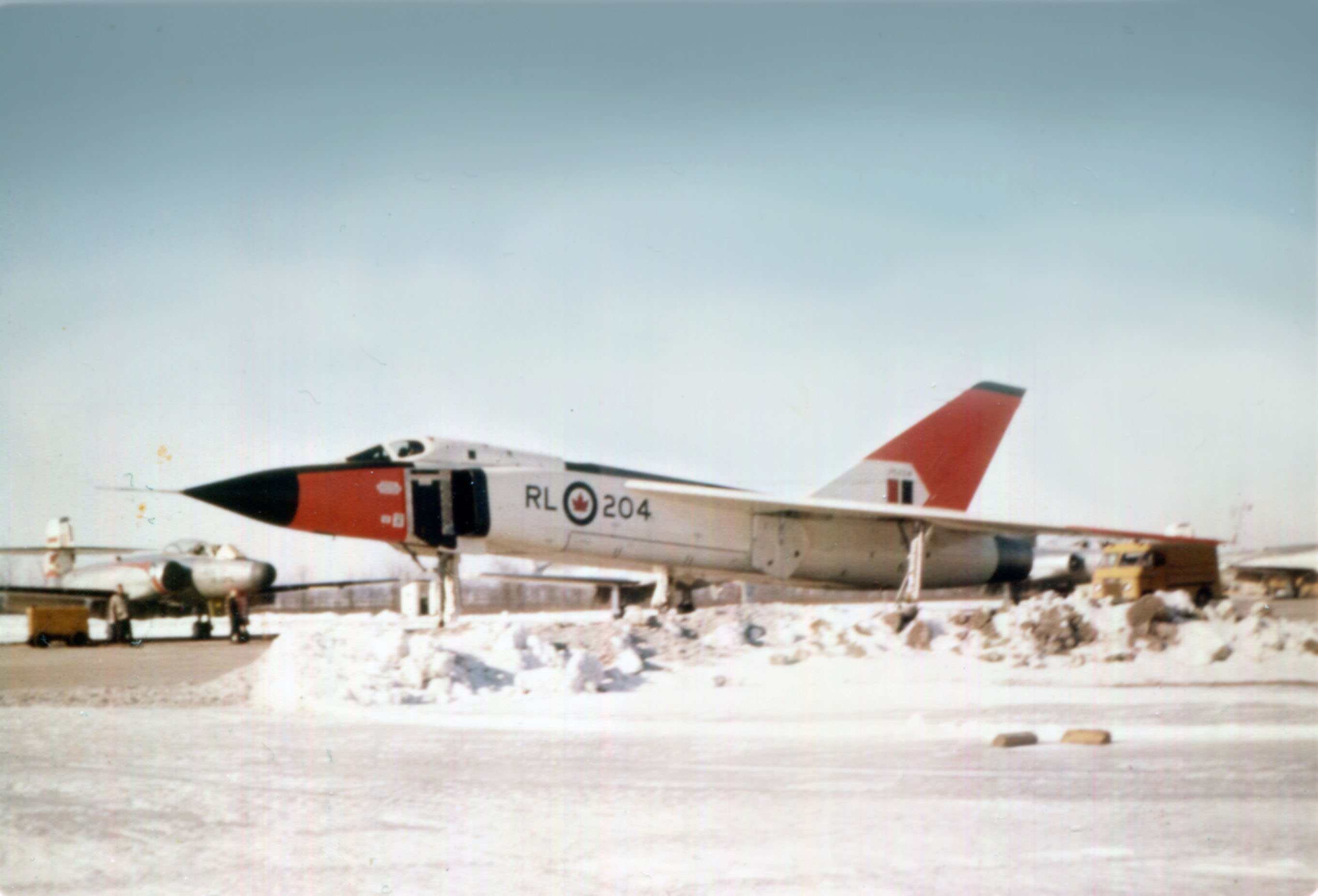
RL-204, late 1958

To meet the timetable set by the RCAF, Avro decided that the Arrow program would adopt the Cook-Craigie plan. Normally a small number of prototypes of an aircraft were hand-built and flown to find problems, and when solutions were found these changes would be worked into the design. When satisfied with the results, the production line would be set up. In a Cook-Craigie system, the production line was set up first and a small number of aircraft were built as production models. Any changes would be incorporated into the jigs while testing continued, with full production starting when the test program was complete. As Jim Floyd noted at the time, this was a risky approach: "it was decided to take the technical risks involved to save time on the programme ... I will not pretend that this philosophy of production type build from the outset did not cause us a lot of problems in Engineering. However, it did achieve its objective."

To mitigate risks, a massive testing program was started. By mid-1954, the first production drawings were issued and wind tunnel work began, along with extensive computer simulation studies carried out both in Canada and the United States using sophisticated computer programs. In a related program, nine instrumented free-flight models were mounted on solid fuel Nike rocket boosters and launched from Point Petre over Lake Ontario while two additional models were launched from the NASA facility at Wallops Island, Virginia, over the Atlantic Ocean. These models were for aerodynamic drag and stability testing, flown to a maximum speed of Mach 1.7+ before intentionally crashing into the water.

Experiments showed the need for only a small number of design changes, mainly involving the wing profile and positioning. To improve high-alpha performance, the leading edge of the wing was drooped, especially on outer sections, a dog-tooth was introduced at about half-span to control spanwise flow, and the entire wing given a slight negative camber which helped control trim drag and pitch-up. The area rule principle, made public in 1952, was also applied to the design. This resulted in several changes including the addition of a tailcone, sharpening the radar nose profile, thinning the intake lips, and reducing the cross-sectional area of the fuselage below the canopy.

The construction of the airframe was fairly conventional, with a semi-monocoque frame and multi-spar wing. The aircraft used a measure of magnesium and titanium in the fuselage, the latter limited largely to the area around the engines and to fasteners. Titanium was still expensive and not widely used because it was difficult to machine.

The Arrow's thin wing required aviation's first 4,000 psi (28 MPa) hydraulic system to supply enough force to the control surfaces, while using small actuators and piping. A rudimentary fly-by-wire system was employed, in which the pilot's input was detected by a series of pressure-sensitive transducers in the stick, their signal sent to an electronic control servo operating valves in the hydraulic system to move the flight controls. This resulted in a lack of control feel; because the control stick input was not mechanically connected to the hydraulic system, the variations in back-pressure from the flight control surfaces that would normally be felt by the pilot could no longer be transmitted back into the stick. To re-create a sense of feel, the same electronic control box rapidly responded to the hydraulic back-pressure fluctuations and triggered actuators in the stick, making it move slightly; this system, called "artificial feel", was also a first.

In 1954, the RB.106 program was cancelled, necessitating the use of the backup Wright J67 engine instead. In 1955, this engine was also cancelled, leaving the design with no engine. At this point, the Pratt & Whitney J75 was selected for the initial test-flight models, while the new TR 13 engine was developed at Orenda for the production Mk. 2s.

After evaluating the engineering mock-ups and the full-scale wooden mock-up in February 1956, the RCAF demanded additional changes, selecting the advanced RCA-Victor Astra fire-control system firing the equally advanced United States Navy Sparrow II in place of the MX-1179 and Falcon combination. Avro vocally objected on the grounds that neither of these were even in testing, whereas both the MX-1179 and Falcon were almost production-ready and would have been nearly as effective for "a very large saving in cost". The Astra proved problematic as the system ran into a lengthy period of delays, and when the USN cancelled the Sparrow II in 1956, Canadair was quickly brought in to continue the Sparrow program in Canada, although they expressed grave concerns about the project as well and the move added yet more expense.

=== Rollout and flight testing ===
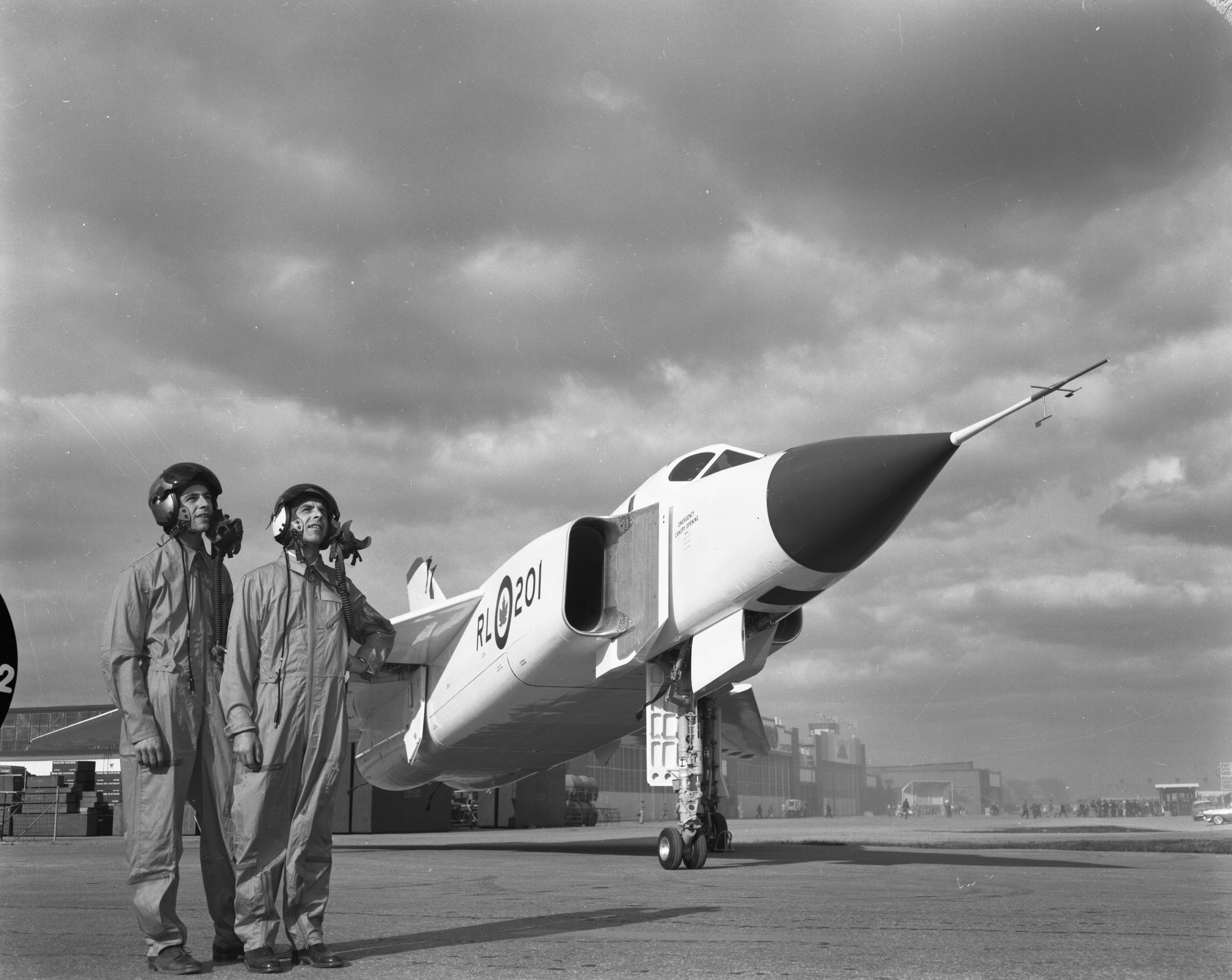
Unveiling of CF-105 on October 4, 1957. Pilots Ron Hodge (left), Ed Wright (right).

Go-ahead on the production was given in 1955. The rollout of the first CF-105, marked as RL-201, took place on 4 October 1957. The company had planned to capitalize on the event, inviting more than 13,000 guests to the occasion. Unfortunately for Avro, the media and public attention for the Arrow rollout was dwarfed by the launch of Sputnik the same day.

The J75 engine was slightly heavier than the PS-13, and therefore required ballast to be placed in the nose to return the centre of gravity to the correct position. In addition, the Astra fire-control system was not ready, and it too, was replaced by ballast. The otherwise unused weapons bay was loaded with test equipment.

The aircraft, at supersonic speeds, was pleasant and easy to fly. During approach and landing, the handling characteristics were considered good ... On my second flight ... the general handling characteristics of the Arrow Mark 1 were much improved ... On my sixth and last flight ... the erratic control in the rolling plane, encountered on the last flight, [was] no longer there ... Excellent progress was being made in the development ... from where I sat the Arrow was performing as predicted and was meeting all guarantees.

— Jack Woodman, the only RCAF pilot to fly the Arrow

RL-201 first flew on 25 March 1958 with Chief Development Test Pilot S/L Janusz Żurakowski at the controls. Four more J75-powered Mk 1s were delivered in the next 18 months. The test flights, limited to "proof-of-concept" and assessing flight characteristics, revealed no serious design faults. The CF-105 demonstrated excellent handling throughout the flight envelope, in large part due to the natural qualities of the delta-wing, but responsibility can also be attributed to the Arrow's Stability Augmentation System. The aircraft went supersonic on its third flight and, on the seventh, broke 1,000 mph (1,600 km/h) at 50,000 ft (15,000 m) while climbing. A top speed of Mach 1.98 was achieved, and this was not at the limits of its performance. An Avro report made public in 2015 clarifies that during the highest speed flight, the Arrow reached Mach 1.90 in steady level flight, and an indicated Mach number of 1.95 was recorded in a dive. Estimates up to Mach 1.98 likely originated from an attempt to compensate for lag error, which was expected in diving flight.

Although no major problems were encountered during the initial testing phase, some minor issues with the landing gear and flight control system had to be rectified. The first was partly due to the tandem main landing gear (Note: The CF-105 used tandem main undercarriage units with two wheels and tires: one in front of and one behind the gear leg.) being very narrow, in order to fit into the wings; the leg shortened in length and rotated as it was stowed. During one landing incident on 11 June 1958, the chain mechanism (used to shorten the gear) in the Mark 1 gear jammed, resulting in the Arrow 201 experiencing a runway excursion and gear collapse. In a second incident with Arrow 202 on 11 November 1958, the flight control system commanded elevons full down at landing; the resulting reduction in weight on the gears reduced the effective tire friction, ultimately resulting in brake lockup and subsequent gear collapse. A photograph taken of the incident proved that inadvertent flight control activation had caused the accident. The only occasion when a test flight was diverted occurred on 2 February 1959, when a Trans-Canada Airlines Vickers Viscount crash-landed in Toronto, necessitating a landing at RCAF Trenton.

The stability augmentation system also required much fine-tuning. Although other aircraft had used such systems before, (Note: The CF-105 Arrow used the stability augmentation system for all three axes; other aircraft in the 1950s, were experimenting with these systems, but had only reached the stage of incorporating simple, one-axis or two-axes stability augmentation.) the CF-105 was among the first of its kind, and was problematic. By February 1959, the five aircraft had completed the majority of the company test program and were progressing to the RCAF acceptance trials.

=== Political issues ===
From 1953, some senior Canadian military officials at the chiefs of staffs began to question the program. The chiefs of staff of the army and navy were both strongly opposed to the Arrow, since "substantial funds were being diverted to the air force", while Air Marshal Hugh Campbell, RCAF Chief of Staff, backed it right up until its cancellation. In June 1957, when the governing Liberals lost the federal election and a Progressive Conservative government under John Diefenbaker took power, the aircraft's prospects began to noticeably change. Diefenbaker had campaigned on a platform of reining in what the Conservatives described as "rampant Liberal spending". Nonetheless, by 1958, the parent company had become Canada's third largest business enterprise and had primary interests in rolling stock, steel and coal, electronics, and aviation with 39 different companies under the A. V. Roe Canada banner.

In September 1957, the Diefenbaker government signed the NORAD (North American Air Defense) Agreement with the United States, making Canada a partner with American command and control. The USAF was in the process of completely automating their air defence system with the SAGE project, and offered Canada the opportunity to share this sensitive information for the air defence of North America. One aspect of the SAGE system was the Bomarc nuclear-tipped anti-aircraft missile. This led to studies on basing Bomarcs in Canada in order to push the defensive line further north, even though the deployment was found to be extremely costly. Deploying the missiles alone was expected to cost C$164 million, while SAGE would absorb another C$107 million, not counting the cost of improvements to radar. Minister of national defence George Pearkes projected these initiatives would raise Canada's defence spending by "as much as 25 to 30%".

Defence against ballistic missiles was increasingly prioritized. The existence of Sputnik raised the possibility of attacks from space, and, as the year progressed, word of a "missile gap" spread. An American brief of the meeting with Pearkes records his concern that Canada could not afford defensive systems against both ballistic missiles and manned bombers. It is also stated Canada could afford the Arrow or Bomarc/SAGE, but not both.

By 11 August 1958, Pearkes requested cancellation of the Arrow, but the Cabinet Defence Committee (CDC) refused. Pearkes tabled it again in September and recommended installation of the Bomarc missile system. The latter was accepted, but again the CDC refused to cancel the entire Arrow program. The CDC wanted to wait until a major review on 31 March 1959. They cancelled the Sparrow/Astra system in September 1958. Efforts to continue the program through cost-sharing with other countries were then explored. In 1959, Pearkes would say the ballistic missile was the greater threat, and Canada purchased Bomarc "in lieu of more airplanes".

== Foreign interest ==
=== Soviet spying ===
There was Soviet interest in the Avro Arrow, and significant spying and infiltration of the program. A Soviet defector and former spy born Yevgeni Brik (alias David Soboloff) confessed to the RCMP that he ran a spy ring within Avro Canada. Another spy, codenamed "Lind," was involved in stealing and passing on top-secret documents, including airframe and engine drawings, photographs, and test data, to the KGB.

Historical understanding of the issue of spying, let alone the basis and truth of reasoning (competition, unfeasibility, cost, compromise, obsolescence or otherwise) behind the end of the program has been fraught, as Canada does not have a policy of timed systematic release of historical documentation in intelligence or in public administration, except in access-to-information processes.

=== Britain ===
Canada unsuccessfully tried to sell the Arrow to the US and Britain. The aircraft industry in both countries was considered a national interest and the purchase of foreign designs was rare.

Nevertheless, from 1955 on the UK had shown considerable interest in the Arrow. Desiring a high-performance interceptor like the Arrow, the RAF began the F.155 program in 1955, projecting a service entry date of 1962. As the program continued, it was clear the aircraft would not be ready in time. It was apparent that new versions of the Soviet M-4 bomber would be available in 1959 that could outperform the Gloster Javelin, implying the RAF would have no effective anti-bomber force for several years. To prevent this, the UK considered interim designs which could be in service by the late 1950s. At first, consideration was given to the thin-wing Javelin that would provide moderate supersonic performance, along with the extremely high performance but short range Saunders-Roe SR.177.

Options for the Arrow's procurement were explored. It was envisioned that the CF-105 would serve as a stopgap until the F.155 project came to fruition, but with the F.155 due in 1963, and the Arrow unlikely to reach the RAF before 1962, it was thought that there was little point in proceeding.

The infamous 1957 Defence White Paper, described as "the biggest change in military policy ever made in normal times", led to the cancellation of almost all British manned fighter aircraft in development and eliminated the possibility of an Arrow purchase. Instead, the UK offered to sell Canada the English Electric Lightning interceptor.

=== France ===
The French government expressed an interest in the Iroquois engine for an enlarged version of the Dassault Mirage IV bomber, the Mirage IVB. This was one of several engines under consideration, including the Olympus, with an order for 300 Iroquois considered. Acting on media speculation that the Iroquois engine program was also at risk of cancellation, the French government ended negotiations in October 1958 and opted for an upgraded version of the indigenous Snecma Atar, instead. The French government never explained its decision, even after Avro offered the Iroquois as a private venture.

=== United States ===
In the US, the 1954 interceptor program was well underway, and would ultimately introduce the Convair F-106 Delta Dart, an aircraft with many similarities to the Arrow. More advanced designs were also being considered, notably the Mach 3 Republic XF-103, and by the time the Arrow was flying, the much more advanced North American XF-108. Both of these programs were cancelled during the mock-up stage, as very high-performance manned interceptors were seen as unneeded in light of the Soviet shift towards ICBMs rather than strategic bombers. This argument added weight to the justification for cancelling the Arrow. In 1958, Avro Aircraft Limited president and general manager Fred Smye elicited a promise from the USAF to "supply, free, the fire control system and missiles and if they would allow the free use of their flight test centre at ... Edwards AFB."

== Cancellation and legacy ==
=== Cancellation ===
The Arrow's cancellation was announced on 20 February 1959, becoming known as "Black Friday" in the Canadian aviation industry. Diefenbaker claimed the decision was based on "a thorough examination" of threats and defensive measures, and the cost of defensive systems. More specifically, the cost would have needed to be amortized over hundreds of manufactured models. At the time the trend was "away from conventional bombers" that the Avro Arrow could intercept and "towards atmospheric weapons like intercontinental ballistic missiles", according to Global News. As a result, foreign demand for the Arrow had declined substantially. Canada's alternative to the Arrow was to purchase American McDonnell F-101 Voodoo interceptors and Bomarc B missiles.

The decision immediately put 14,528 Avro employees, as well as nearly 15,000 employees in the Avro supply chain, out of work. Declassified records show Avro management was caught unprepared by Diefenbaker's announcement; executives knew the program was in jeopardy but expected it to continue until the March review. It was widely believed during this lead-up to the review, the first Arrow Mk. 2, RL-206, would be prepared for an attempt at both world speed and altitude records.

An attempt was made to provide the completed Arrows to the National Research Council of Canada as high-speed test aircraft. The NRC refused, noting that without sufficient spare parts and maintenance, as well as qualified pilots, the NRC could make no use of them. A similar project initiated by the Royal Aircraft Establishment (Boscombe Down) had resulted in Avro vice president of engineering Jim Floyd preparing a transatlantic ferry operation. This proposal, like others from the United States, was never realized.

=== Aftermath ===
Within two months of the cancellation, all aircraft, engines, production tooling and technical data were ordered scrapped. Officially, the reason given for the destruction order from cabinet and the chiefs of staff was to destroy classified and "secret" materials used in the Arrow and Iroquois programs. The action has been attributed to Royal Canadian Mounted Police fears that a Soviet "mole" had infiltrated Avro, which were later confirmed to some degree in the Mitrokhin Archives.

Rumours circulated that air marshal W. A. Curtis, a World War I ace who headed Avro, had defied Diefenbaker and hidden one of the Arrows away to be saved for posterity. These rumours were given life in a 1968 interview, where Curtis refused to confirm or deny the allegation. He proceeded to question the wisdom of printing the story of a missing Arrow, and wondered whether it would be safe to reveal the existence of a surviving airframe only nine years later. "If it is in existence it may have to wait another 10 years. Politically it may cause a lot of trouble." The legend endures that one of the prototypes remains intact somewhere.

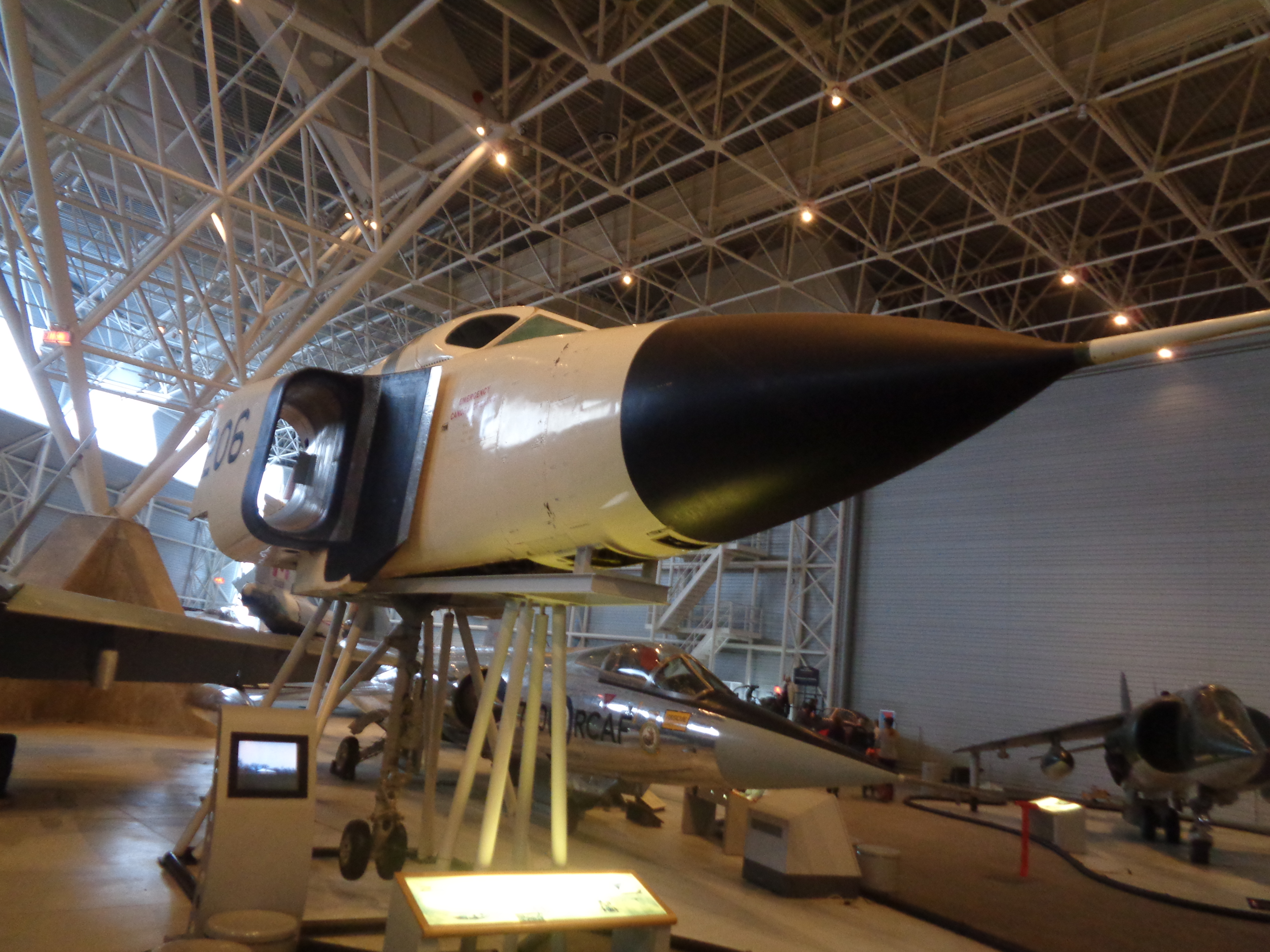
Arrow nose section on display at the Canada Aviation and Space Museum.

Following the cancellation of the Avro Arrow project, CF-105 chief aerodynamicist Jim Chamberlin led a team of 25 engineers to NASA's Space Task Group to become lead engineers, program managers, and heads of engineering in NASA's manned space programs—projects Mercury, Gemini and Apollo. The Space Task Group team eventually grew to 32 Avro engineers and technicians, becoming emblematic of what many Canadians viewed as "brain drain" to the United States. Among the former Arrow engineers to go south were Tecwyn Roberts (NASA's first flight dynamics officer on Project Mercury and later director of networks at the Goddard Space Flight Center), John Hodge (flight director and manager on the cancelled Space Station Freedom project), Dennis Fielder (director of the Space Station Task Force, later the Space Station), Owen Maynard (chief of the LM engineering office in the Apollo Program Office), Bruce Aikenhead, and Rod Rose (technical assistant for the Space Shuttle program). Many other engineers, including Jim Floyd, found work in either the UK or the United States. Work undertaken by both Avro Canada and Floyd benefited supersonic research at Hawker Siddeley, Avro Aircraft's UK parent, and contributed to programs such as the HSA.1000 supersonic transport design studies, influential in the design of the Concorde.

In 1961, the RCAF obtained 66 McDonnell CF-101 Voodoo aircraft, one of the American designs the RCAF originally rejected, (Note: Although the source indicates it was the F-101 that was evaluated, it was the XF-88 Voodoo that was flying at the time while the F-101 was a revised and upgraded variant only in the development stage in 1953.) to serve in the role originally intended for the Avro Arrow. The controversy surrounding this acquisition, and Canada's acquiring nuclear weapons for the Voodoos and Bomarcs, contributed to the collapse of the Diefenbaker government in 1963.

=== Legacy ===
Although nearly everything connected to the CF-105 and Orenda Iroquois programs was destroyed, some items were saved and are on display at the Canada Aviation and Space Museum in Ottawa: the cockpit and nose gear of RL-206, the first Mk 2 Arrow, and two outer panels of RL-203's wings, alongside an Iroquois engine.

At the time of its cancellation, with specifications comparable to then-current offerings from American and Soviet design bureaus, the Arrow was considered by one aviation industry observer to be one of the most advanced aircraft in the world. According to Bill Gunston:

In its planning, design and flight-test programme, this fighter, in almost every way the most advanced of all the fighters of the 1950s, was as impressive, and successful as any aircraft in history.

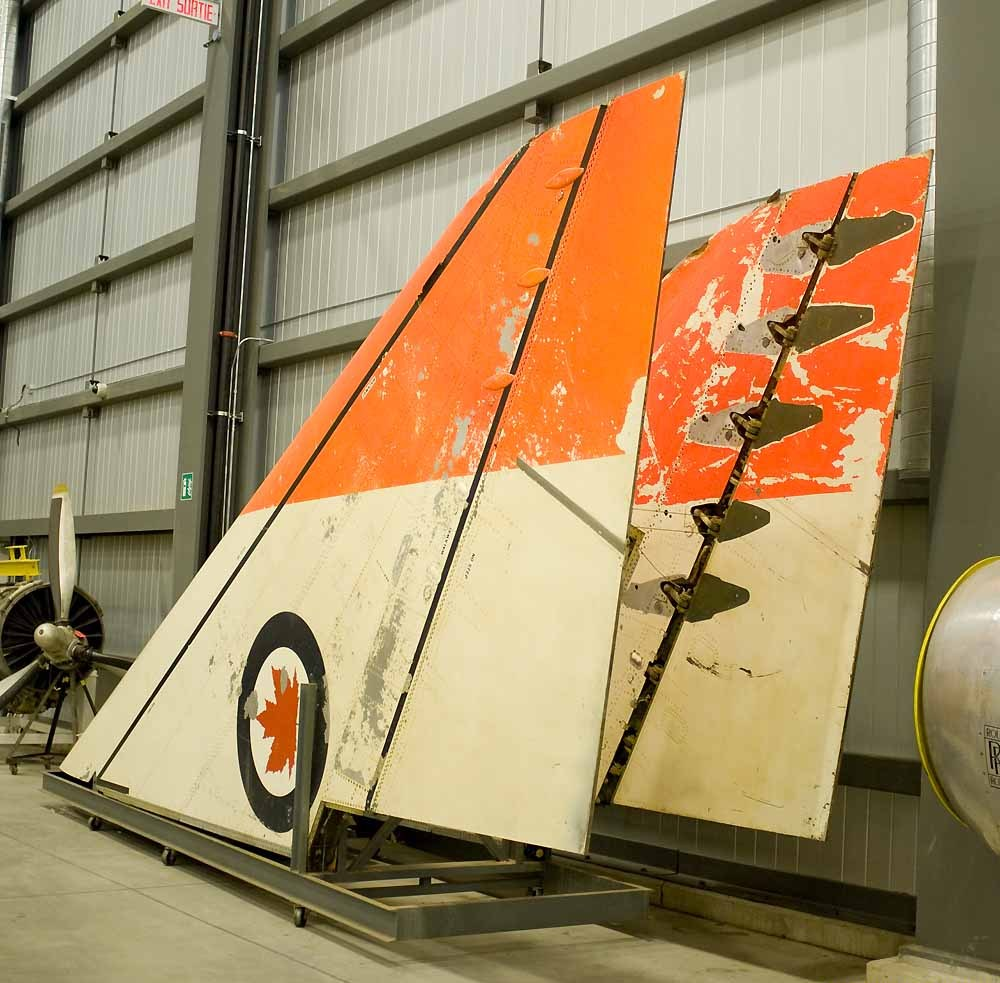
Prototype No. 3's wing outer panels at the Canada Aviation and Space Museum.

The Arrow's cancellation eventually led to the end of Avro Aircraft Limited (Canada), and its president and general manager, Crawford Gordon Jr., was fired shortly afterward. In 1962, the Hawker Siddeley Group formally dissolved A. V. Roe Canada and transferred all its assets to Hawker Siddeley's newly formed subsidiary, Hawker Siddeley Canada.

The nose cone section of Avro Arrow RL-206, currently on display at the Canada Aviation and Space Museum in Ottawa, was smuggled out of the Avro Aircraft plant in Malton by members of the RCAF Flying Personnel Medical Establishment, a detachment of RCAF Station Downsview on Avenue Road in Toronto, where it resided for many years and was employed in high-altitude work. The commanding officer of the Flying Personnel Medical Establishment, wing commander Roy Stubbs, provided this prologue:

One day after a change of government, the new RCAF Chief of the Air Staff came to inspect our facilities and programs and after lunch, I asked if he would like to see something special. I showed him a piece of the Arrow; cockpit section and engine nacelles and a few other bits. I asked him what we should do with it and he said to keep it hidden until the climate in Ottawa was right, and then he would arrange to have it placed in the National Aeronautical Museum in Ottawa. Eventually this was done and at least a bit of history was saved.

Around 2011, a new version of the Avro Arrow was privately proposed as an alternative to a Canadian purchase of F-35 aircraft. The proposal, promoted by former Canadian Forces infantry officer Lewis MacKenzie, was rejected by Ottawa in 2012 for being too risky, costly and time-consuming, as it would require re-engineering a 1950s-era aircraft to incorporate modern communication, targeting and stealth features. Member of Parliament and former Canadian Forces fighter pilot Laurie Hawn described the CF-105 as having been advanced 50 years prior, but "hopelessly behind its time" in 2012.

== Variants ==
=== Mark 1 ===
The Arrow Mark 1 was the initial version powered by two Pratt & Whitney J75 turbojet engines that produced 23,500 pounds-force (105 kN) of thrust each. The Mk 1 was used for development and flight testing. Five were completed.

=== Mark 2 ===
The Mk 2 version was to be fitted with the Orenda PS-13 Iroquois engines and would be evaluated by RCAF acceptance pilots as well as Avro test pilots. The new PS-13S engines were designed to produce 30,000 lbf (130 kN) each. The Astra/Sparrow fire control system had been terminated by the government in September 1958 with all aircraft to employ the Hughes/Falcon combination. At the time of cancellation of the entire program, the first Arrow Mk 2, RL-206, was ready for taxi trials. Though Avro expected it to break the world speed record, it would never fly. Though speed would have been limited by atmospheric frictional heating, according to project engineer James Floyd, "[t]he aluminum alloy structure which we favoured was good for speeds greater than a Mach number of 2."

=== Other designs ===
Avro Canada had a wide range of advanced Arrow variants under development at the time of project cancellation. Frequent mention is made of an Arrow that could have been capable of Mach 3, similar to the Mikoyan-Gurevich MiG-25. This was not the production version, but one of the design studies, and would have been a greatly modified version of the Arrow Mk 2, featuring revised engine inlets and extensive use of carbon steel and titanium to withstand airframe heating. The Mark 2A and Mark 3 were also to have updated engines, capable of producing 39,800 lbf (177 kN) each, increasing the maximum takeoff weight by 17,000 lb (7,700 kg) and flight ceiling to 70,000 ft.

=== Replicas ===
A replica Arrow built by Allan Jackson was used in The Arrow, a Canadian Broadcasting Corporation (CBC) miniseries. He began building a full-scale replica of the Arrow in 1989, and was approached by the producers of the miniseries in 1996, when the replica was about 70% complete. They offered to complete the model's construction if Jackson permitted the CBC to use it in The Arrow. The replica appeared in the miniseries and several public air shows before Jackson donated it to the Reynolds-Alberta Museum in his home town of Wetaskiwin, Alberta. While in a temporary outdoor collection, it was damaged in a wind storm in 2009. It has since been repaired, but is no longer publicly on display, currently being in museum storage.

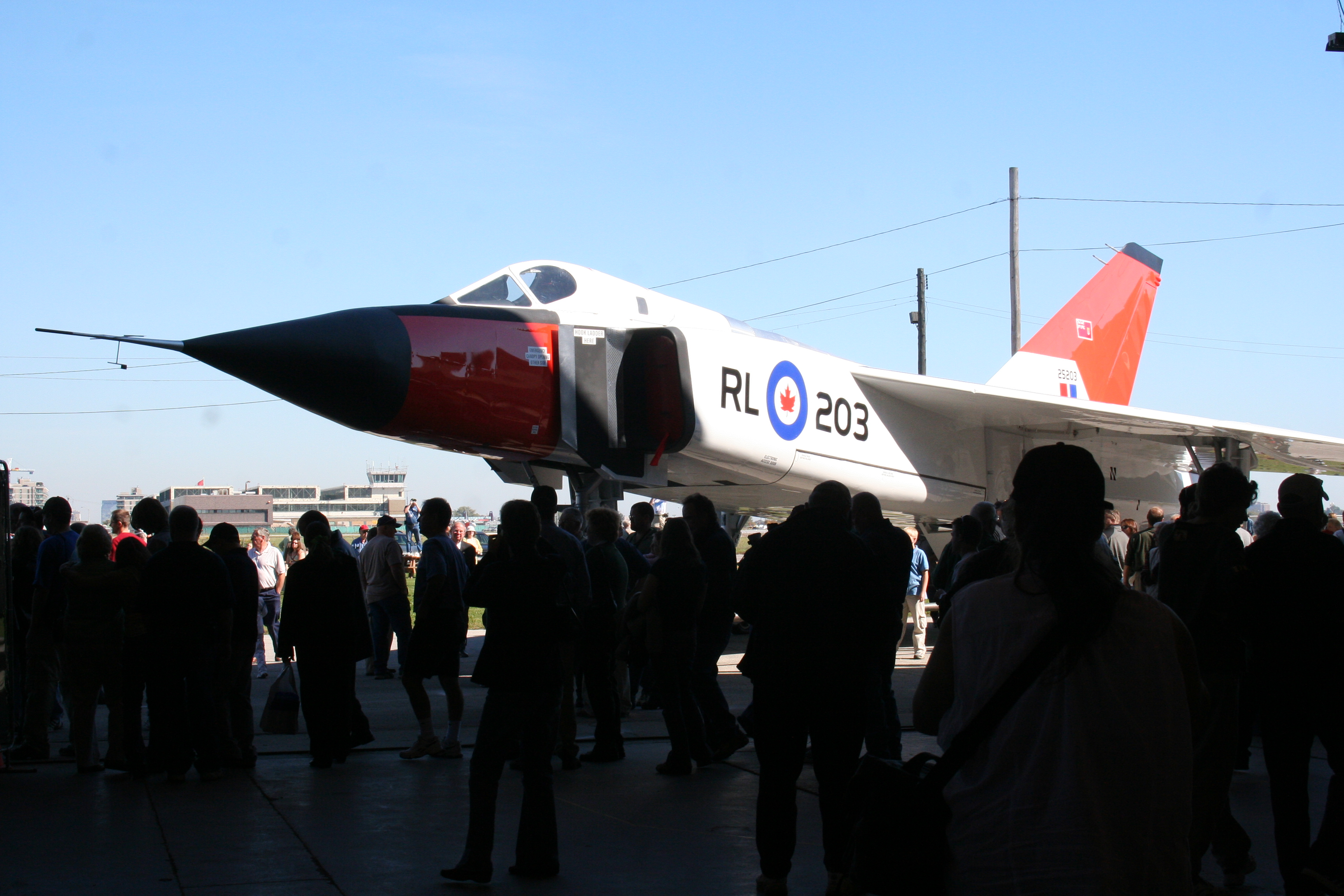
Avro Arrow replica at CASM Arrow rollout, 8 October 2006

The Avro Museum, based out of Calgary/Springbank Airport west of Calgary, Alberta, is building a 2/3rd scale, manned, high performance flying replica of the Avro Arrow (officially known as ARROW II) to Canadian Aviation Experimental Aircraft Regulations in order to become an airshow demonstration aircraft. Construction began in October 2007, and by 2012 the fuselage was completed and passed its first MDRA inspection, and now has a serial number. Powered by a pair of Pratt & Whitney JT-15D-4s, the ARROW II is to have a top speed of approximately 926 km/h (Mach 0.75) and a range of 2900 kms. Current projections show a final cost of the project at approximately one million dollars ($1.4 million as of 2025) and it was hoped that ground tests would start in about 2016 with the first flight to follow.

The Canadian Air and Space Museum (CASM), previously located at the Toronto/Downsview Airport, featured a full-size replica Arrow built by volunteers with materials supplied by local aerospace firms. With a metal structure, the replica features many authentic-looking components including a landing gear constructed by Messier-Dowty, the original Arrow primary landing gear subcontractor. Painted by Bombardier Inc. at their Downview plant in the colours of Arrow 25203, the Arrow replica was rolled out for a media event on 28 September 2006 and publicly displayed on 8–9 October 2006 to commemorate the 49th anniversary of the original aircraft's rollout in 1957. In late 2019, Milan Kroupa brought the replica to Edenvale Airport, south of Georgian Bay in Southern Ontario. It is currently on display in a hangar, with weekly showings to the public.

=== Scale models ===
Between 1954 and 1957, nine Avro Arrow models, scaled at one-eighth size or about 10 feet (3 m) long, are believed to have been launched using rockets over Lake Ontario from Point Petre in Prince Edward County, Ontario as part of the process for testing the hull design. They travelled at supersonic speeds as onboard sensors sent data back to shore. Two others were launched in Virginia. After many attempts to find the models, a new search began in late July 2017. The Raise the Arrow project, operated by OEX Recovery Group Incorporated, was a joint venture by several companies, the Canadian Coast Guard and the Royal Canadian Military Institute. A Thunderfish autonomous submarine, equipped with an AquaPix interferometric synthetic aperture sonar, was used to survey the relevant area of the lake bottom. Any scale models found will be restored and displayed at the Canada Aviation and Space Museum in Ottawa and the National Air Force Museum of Canada in Trenton, Ontario.

In September 2017, the Raise the Arrow Project confirmed the discovery of one of the 1/8 scale Delta Test Vehicle (DTV) models at the bottom of Lake Ontario. It was recovered in August 2018. The model was restored and has been on display at the Canadian Aviation and Space Museum since 2019. The search for one of the more advanced Arrow test models, in cooperation with the Royal Canadian Air Force, continued. In September 2020, OEX announced that a piece of another test model had been discovered; the Project was working on a method to recover that piece and find other fragments of the same wreck.

=== "Destroyed" plans re-discovered ===
On January 6, 2020, CBC News announced that the Arrow's plans, long thought to have been destroyed, were kept. Ken Barnes, a senior draftsman on the project in 1959, was ordered to destroy all documents related to the Avro Arrow project. Instead, he quietly took the blueprints home, storing them in his basement for decades. The blueprints were on display in the Touch the Sky: The Story of Avro Canada exhibit at the Diefenbaker Canada Centre at the University of Saskatchewan until April 2020.

In 2021, the National Research Council of Canada digitized and released 595 Avro Arrow reports stored in their rare book room and the NRC Archives, both located in Ottawa.

=== Legacy ===
The "Avro Arrow Private" street name commemorates the aircraft at Ottawa Macdonald–Cartier International Airport. Also, OC Transpo route 105, scheduled to serve Ottawa Macdonald–Cartier International Airport beginning in late-August 2025, is named after the CF-105.

== Prospective operator ==
Canada

- Royal Canadian Air Force – Cancelled before entering service.

== Specifications (Arrow Mk 1) ==
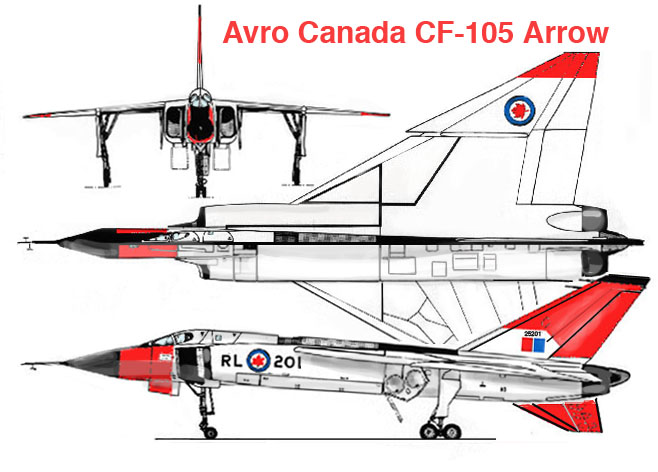
Avro CF-105 Arrow 3-view

External image
- Avro CF-105 Arrow cutaway
- Cutaway of the Avro CF-105 Arrow by Flight Global.

Data from The Great Book of Fighters, The Canadian Approach to All-Weather Interceptor Development, Avro Arrow: The Story of the Avro Arrow from its Evolution to its Extinction

General characteristics

- Crew: 2
- Length: 77 ft 9 in (23.70 m)
- Wingspan: 50 ft (15 m)
- Height: 21 ft 2 in (6.45 m)
- Wing area: 1,225 sq ft (113.8 m^{2})
- Airfoil: root: NACA 0003.5 (modified); tip: NACA 0003.8 (modified)
- Empty weight: 49,040 lb (22,244 kg)
- Gross weight: 56,920 lb (25,818 kg)
- Max takeoff weight: 68,605 lb (31,119 kg)
- Powerplant: 2 × Pratt & Whitney J75-P-3 afterburning turbojet engines, 16,500 lbf (73 kN) thrust each (Note: A wide variety of sources confuse the J75 used in the Arrow with its smaller cousin, the Pratt & Whitney J57. The J-57 produced about 12,500 lbf (56 kN) dry and 18,500 lbf (82 kN) in afterburner.) dry, 23,500 lbf (105 kN) with afterburner

Performance

- Maximum speed: 1,136 kn (1,307 mph, 2,104 km/h) at 50,000 ft (15,000 m) max. recorded speed (Mach 2+ potential)
- Maximum speed: Mach 1.98
- Cruise speed: 527 kn (606 mph, 976 km/h) / M0.91 at 36,000 ft (11,000 m)
- Combat range: 261 nmi (300 mi, 483 km) (combat radius)
- Service ceiling: 53,000 ft (16,000 m)
- Wing loading: 46.5 lb/sq ft (227 kg/m^{2})
- Thrust/weight: 0.825 at loaded weight

Armament

- Missiles: * 2 × AIR-2A Genie unguided nuclear rockets

or

- Up to 4 × Canadair Velvet Glove (cancelled 1956) or 8 × AIM-4 Falcon or 3 AIM-7 Sparrow II 2D active guidance missiles (cancelled)

Avionics

- Hughes MX-1179 fire control system

== Notable appearances in media ==
In 1997, the CBC broadcast their two-part miniseries, The Arrow. (Note: Subsequent re-broadcasts on CBC Television as well as Discovery and other "specialty channels" in Canada, continued until 2009.) The production used a combination of archival film, remote-control flying models and computer animation for the static, ground and flying sequences. Although highly acclaimed, receiving praise from film historian and former Avro employee Elwy Yost and winner of numerous awards including the Gemini that year, the miniseries was criticized for its "docu-drama" style and departing from a strict factual account. The continued rebroadcasts and accompanying DVD releases have re-animated the controversy over the Arrow's cancellation and introduced the story to a new generation.

== See also ==
- Aerospace Heritage Foundation of Canada
- BAC TSR-2
- C. D. Howe

Aircraft of comparable role, configuration, and era

- Convair F-106 Delta Dart
- Dassault MD.750
- English Electric Lightning
- FMA I.Ae. 48
- Lavochkin La-250
- McDonnell Douglas F-4 Phantom II
- McDonnell F-101 Voodoo
- Mikoyan-Gurevich MiG-25
- North American XF-108 Rapier
- Operational Requirement F.155 Project (UK)
- Republic XF-103
- Saab 35 Draken
- Saunders-Roe SR.177
- Shenyang J-6
- Tupolev Tu-28

Related lists

- List of aircraft of Canada's air forces
- List of fighter aircraft
