= Cook–Craigie plan =

In aviation, the Cook–Craigie plan is an approach to the development process of civil and military aircraft, designed to reduce the time needed to bring a new design into service. In the late 1940s, US Air Force Major Generals Laurence C. Craigie, deputy chief of staff for development, and Orval R. Cook, deputy chief of staff for materiel, proposed that new designs should move directly into the production phase without the construction of prototypes. Since then, this approach has been used in an increasing number of aviation projects.

== Method ==
In traditional aircraft design, after the design drawings (or "blueprints") are prepared, a small series of prototype aircraft are constructed in order to test the concept. Data from the flight tests influences the revisions that are made to the design. If these changes are wide-ranging and/or significant, more prototypes have to be built. Once the prototype cycle is complete, the development can enter the "pre-production" stage and further evaluation. Once this stage is completed satisfactorily, series production can begin.

The Cook–Craigie plan promoted the elimination of the entire prototype cycle and entering straight into the pre-production stage. If these examples flew as expected, production could start immediately. The plan required considerable confidence in the design from the outset; if the design had an inherent flaw, the jigs used during pre-production would have to be replaced. The plan seems inherently more dangerous than the traditional prototype cycle, but Cook and Craigie argued that for the advanced designs that were entering service in the late 1940s, any prototype was likely to be so different from the production variant that any data collected could be entirely misleading. Moreover, since several aircraft designs are typically ordered for competitive testing, the chance that all of the designs would fail is extremely low, and if even one design passes testing, it can immediately enter production.

One of the first designs to use the plan was the F-102 Delta Dagger. Although this design had a number of new features, it was based to a large degree on the earlier XF-92 prototype, and thus considered to be a fairly well understood design. This confidence proved to be misplaced, as the F-102 underwent a lengthy series of upgrades, and was eventually replaced in service by a redesigned version, the F-106 Delta Dart. Another example of the Cook–Craigie method is the development of the Avro CF-105 Arrow, which passed through the testing phase with few required changes.

As the potential of computer-aided design has increased since the 1950s, aircraft designs have generally performed much closer to their original goals. For example, the production specification of the Boeing 777 was within 20 lb of its predicted weight. Today the Cook–Craigie approach is used as standard, and no longer known as such.
