= Canadian Air and Space Conservancy =

Aviation museum in Toronto, Ontario

- Former names: Toronto Aerospace Museum; Canadian Air and Space Museum
- Established: 1997
- Location: Edenvale Airport
- Coordinates: 44.4429°N 79.9634°W
- Type: Aviation museum
- Website: https://www.avroarrow203.com/

The Canadian Air and Space Conservancy (formerly the Toronto Aerospace Museum and the Canadian Air and Space Museum) was an aviation museum that was located in Toronto, Ontario, featuring artifacts, exhibits and stories illustrating a century of Canadian aviation heritage and achievements. The museum was located in a hangar that once housed the original de Havilland Canada aircraft manufacturing building, but in September 2011 the museum and all of the other tenants in the building were evicted by the landlord, the Crown Corporation, PDP (Downsview Park). The site was slated for redevelopment as a new sports centre but after closing the museum the development was placed on hold. The museum is developing a new location and its collections are available Wednesdays through Saturdays, online booking required.

Located in what is now known as Downsview Park, the hangar was later appropriated by the Royal Canadian Air Force as a part of RCAF Station Downsview, and then later as CFB Toronto, which was closed in April 1996. On September 20, 2011, after the order to vacate the premises, the museum's collection was transferred to forty-four, 40-foot freight containers and stored in a parking lot on the Greater Toronto Airports Authority (GTAA) property in Toronto. The collection was then unloaded into warehouse space provided by GTAA, until 2018.

When it was active the institution was largely run by volunteers and had the goal of educating visitors on the Canadian aerospace industry and technology. It is a registered Canadian non-profit organization, operating as the "Canadian Air & Space Museum".

In November 2018 it was announced that the museum would reopen at Edenvale Airport, 100 km northwest of Toronto, near Edenvale, Ontario, in 2019 and be renamed the Canadian Air and Space Conservancy.

== History ==
Former logo when the museum was located at Downsview

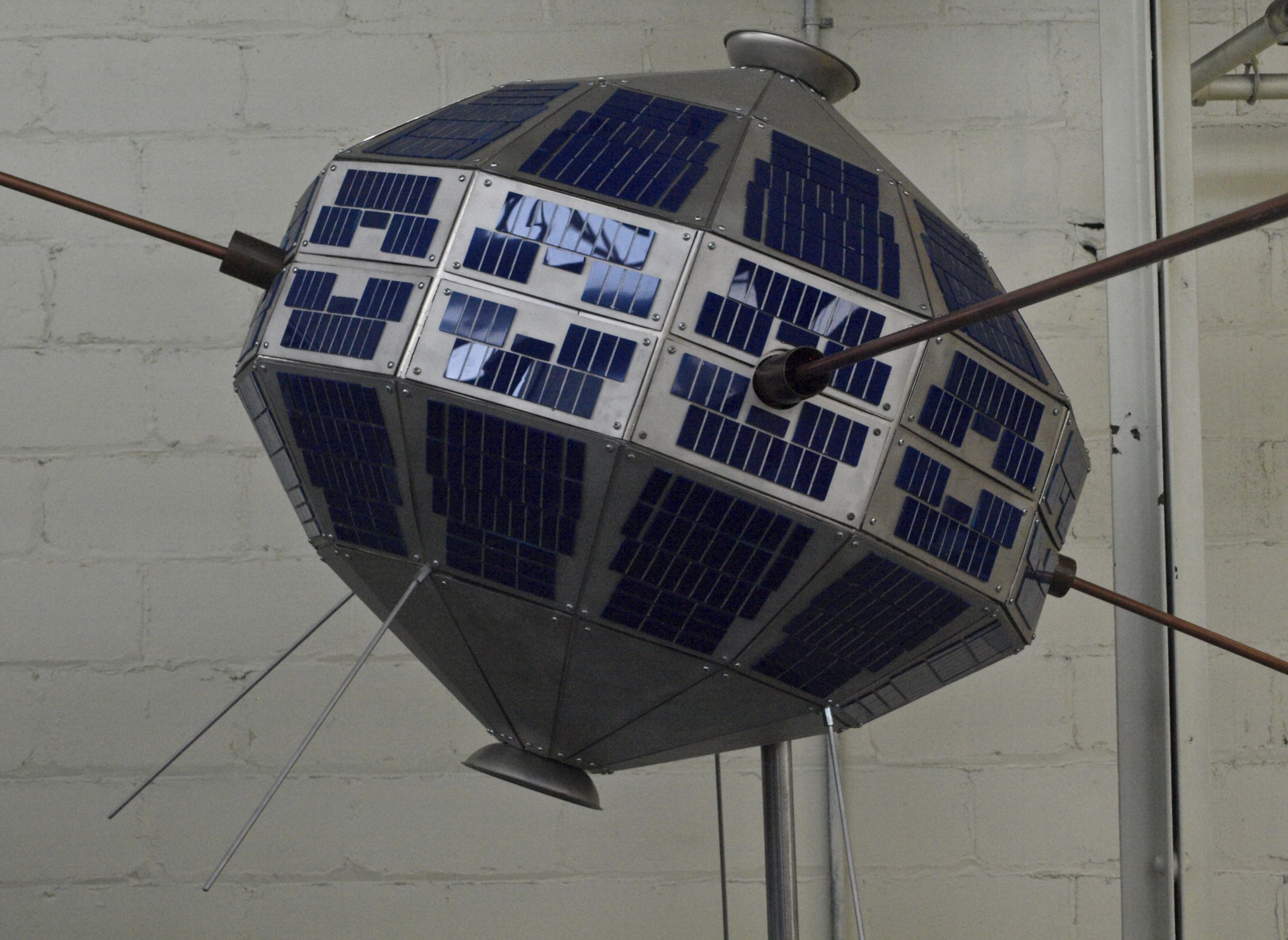
Replica of the Alouette I

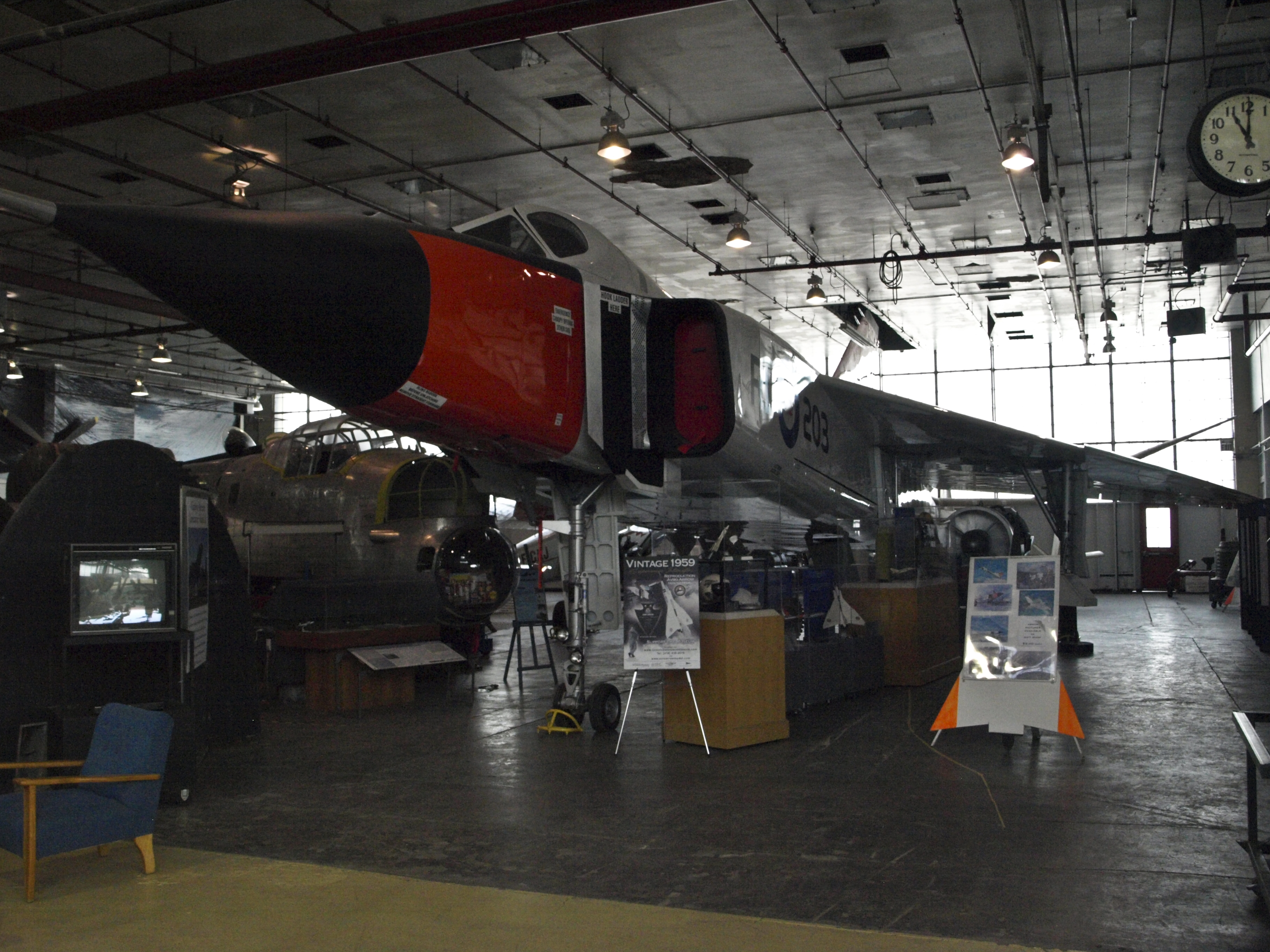
Full-sized replica of an Avro Arrow

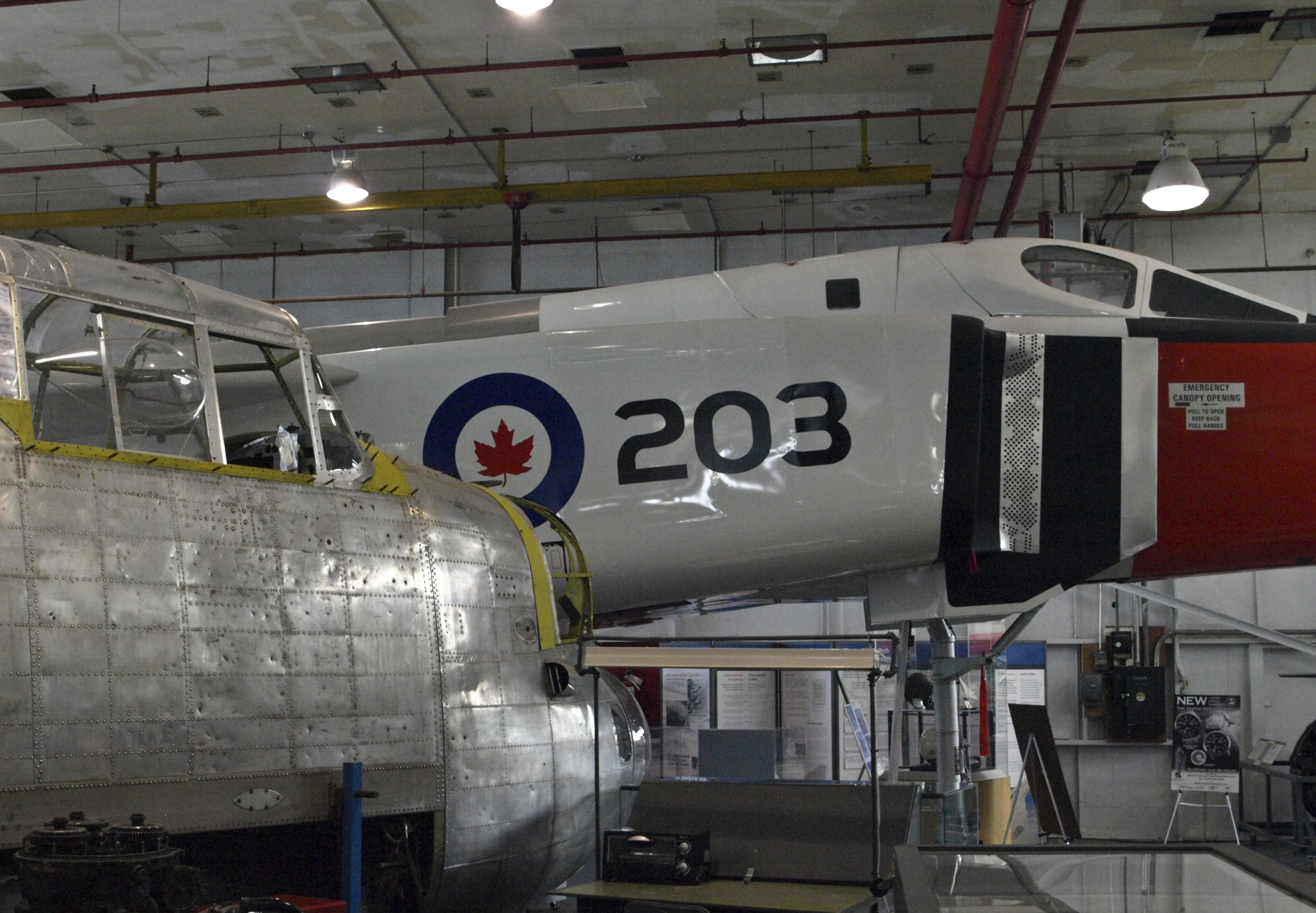
Avro Lancaster being restored alongside the full-sized Avro Arrow replica

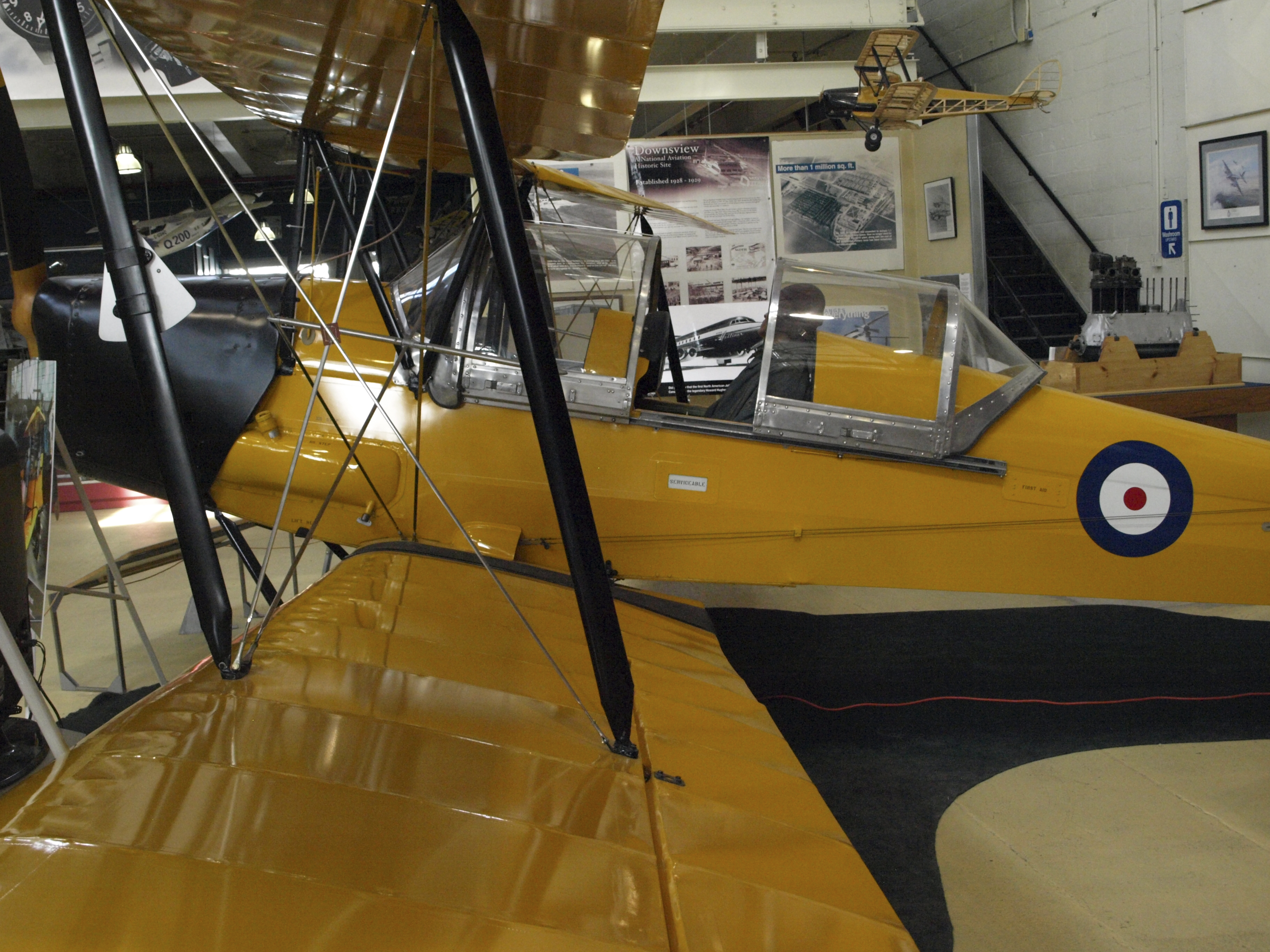
Restored Tiger Moth on display

The museum was housed in what was the original factory for the de Havilland Aircraft of Canada. It is the oldest surviving aircraft factory building in Canada. This building saw the creation of the de Havilland Beaver and Otter bush planes which helped to open the Canadian North, and was also the place where Alouette I, the first Canadian satellite was assembled.

Originally named the Toronto Aerospace Museum, the museum was re-launched under its new name, the Canadian Air and Space Museum, on February 20, 2009. To add space exploration to the museum's mandate the board contemplated a series of possible names. Since the national museum in Ottawa was called the "National Aviation Museum" and also had no space mandate, the name "Canadian Air and Space Museum" (CASM) was chosen. About one year after the successful rebranding and launch in Downsview the National Museum in Ottawa moved its space artifacts from the Science Museum to the National Aviation Museum and rebranded itself as the Canada Aviation and Space Museum which led to considerable confusion since Ottawa also adopted the acronym CASM.

At that time the Downsview museum had plans to further renovate the premises to better house their large exhibits and to provide more detailed information for visitors and school programs. Plans included specific galleries to house the full-sized Avro Arrow replica, another for the Avro Lancaster and additional galleries dedicated to the history of the de Havilland aircraft company, Canadian achievements in space, including a theatre and planetarium.

The museum was given the notice of eviction from its hangar ostensibly for failure to pay over Can$100,000 in back rent, even though the museum was in the process of repaying the rent owed and had been assured they would not be evicted. The museum relocated the collection into storage by March 2012 before subsequently learning that all of the other tenants of 65 Carl Hall Road had also been served eviction notices and that Downsview Park intended to replace the entire facility with a hockey rink.

Media reports indicate that the museum held its last day open on 25 September 2011 and also launched a massive campaign to save the museum, including enlisting the aid of historians like Jack Granatstein as well as starting a petition. On September 21, 2011 Toronto Councillor Maria Augimeri proposed a motion that "City Council call on the Federal Government to recognize the contributions of Canadian aerospace and aviation innovation; grant the Canadian Air and Space Museum (CASM) located on the site of the former military base in Downsview, a long-term reprieve and provide assurances of its preservation on the Downsview lands." The motion was passed unanimously.

On 29 October 2011 it was reported that, although the museum building had previously been listed as a federal Heritage Building by both Parks Canada and the Federal Heritage Buildings Review Office, these listings had recently disappeared and Parks Canada claimed that they had been erroneous.

The museum temporarily relocated its artifacts to a secure storage location at Toronto Pearson International Airport.

In November 2018 it was announced that the museum's collection would be relocated to Edenvale Airport, 100 km northwest of Toronto. It will reopen in 2019 and be renamed the Canadian Air and Space Conservancy. By mid-December 2018 the museum's Avro Arrow replica had been relocated from outdoor storage where it had begun to deteriorate, to an Edenvale hangar.

The museum is affiliated with the Canadian Museums Association, Canadian Heritage Information Network and the Virtual Museum of Canada.

== Collection and exhibits ==
The museum's collection includes: an Avro Lancaster that was undergoing restoration; a full-scale replica of the Avro Arrow, a de Havilland Tiger Moth, Grumman Tracker and many other Canadian-made aircraft. The museum also houses the original equipment that was used to build over a thousand Curtiss JN-4 biplanes in between 1917 and 1918, flight training simulators from the 1940s and 1950s, and exhibits relating to the history of Downsview air force base.

=== Aircraft displayed ===
- AEA Silver Dart Replica on loan
- Aer Pegaso M-100S
- Avro Canada CF-105 Arrow replica
- Avro Lancaster FM104 Restoration Project
- Beechcraft CT-134 Musketeer
- Bell CH-136 Kiowa
- Canadair CT-114 Tutor in Snowbirds markings
- Canadair CT-133 Silver Star
- Cessna 150D
- de Havilland Canada DHC-1 Chipmunk
- de Havilland Hornet Moth
- De Havilland Canada DH.82C Tiger Moth
- de Havilland Canada CS2F Tracker (Currently in storage.)
- Fleet 80 Canuck
- Found Brothers Aviation FBA-2A (Currently in storage.)
- SHARP (Stationary High-Altitude Relay Platform)
- Stinson Reliant
- UFM Easy Riser ultralight
- UTIAS Ornithopter No.1 - University of Toronto Institute for Aerospace Studies
- Zenair CH 200

=== Engine collection ===
- Alvis Leonides
- de Havilland Gipsy Major
- Orenda Iroquois Jet Engine replica
- Pratt & Whitney R-1830 Twin Wasp
- Pratt & Whitney Wasp Jr
- Rolls-Royce Derwent

=== Simulators ===
- Link C8 Trainer
- Air Canada Viscount Simulator

=== Art gallery ===
- The First DH82C Tiger Moth original oil painting by Charles Kadin, 1998.

== See also ==
- Organization of Military Museums of Canada
- Military history of Canada
- de Havilland Aircraft of Canada Ltd
- Downsview Park
- List of aerospace museums
