= Laurence Carbee Craigie =

American aviator (1902–1994)

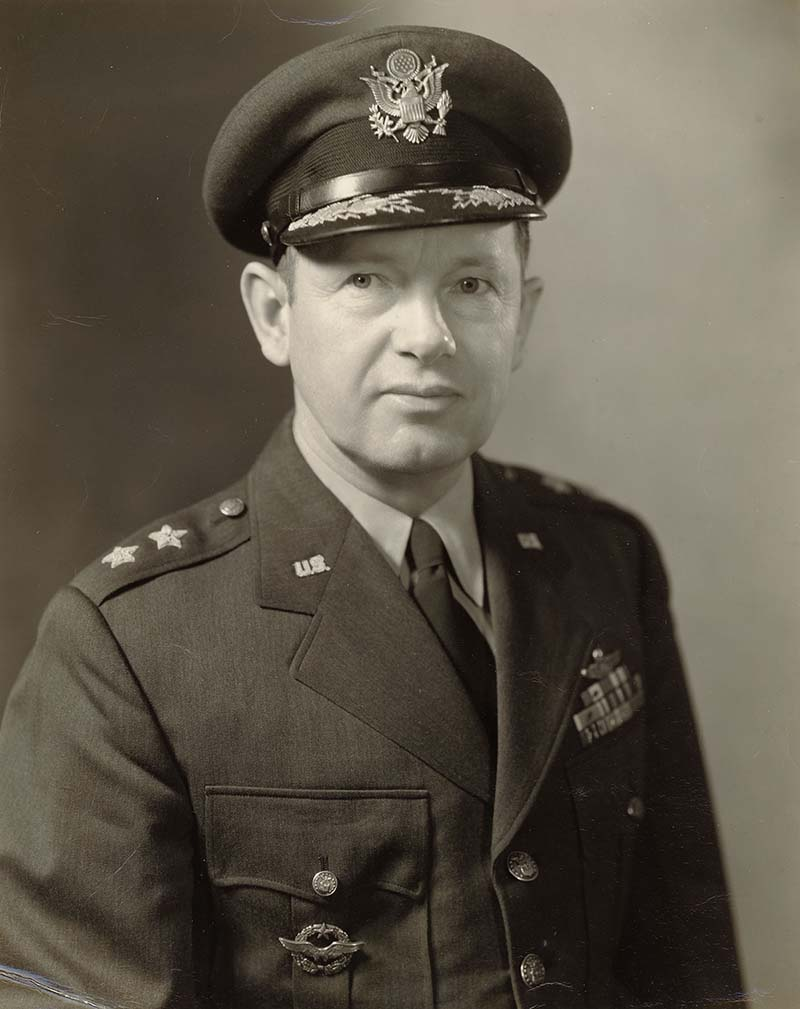
- Born: January 26, 1902; Concord, New Hampshire, US
- Died: February 27, 1994 (aged 92); Riverside, California, US
- Burial place: West Point Cemetery; United States Air Force Academy Cemetery (ashes divided)
- Military career
- Allegiance: United States of America
- Branch: United States Air Force
- Service years: 1923–1955
- Rank: Lieutenant General
- Commands: Allied Air Forces Southern Europe; Commandant, Air Force Institute of Technology
- Conflicts: World War II; Korean War
- Awards: Distinguished Service Medal (2); Silver Star; Legion of Merit (2); Distinguished Flying Cross; Air Medal

Laurence Carbee Craigie (Note: His middle name is spelled "Cardee" on some documents. It is "Carbee" in the Air Force Biographical Dictionary, West Point yearbook and on his gravestones.) (January 26, 1902 – February 27, 1994), was an American aviator and United States Air Force general. He became the first U.S. military jet pilot in 1942 when he piloted the Bell XP-59. With Orval R. Cook he is also known as one half of the Cook-Craigie plan, a method of producing aircraft.

== Biography ==
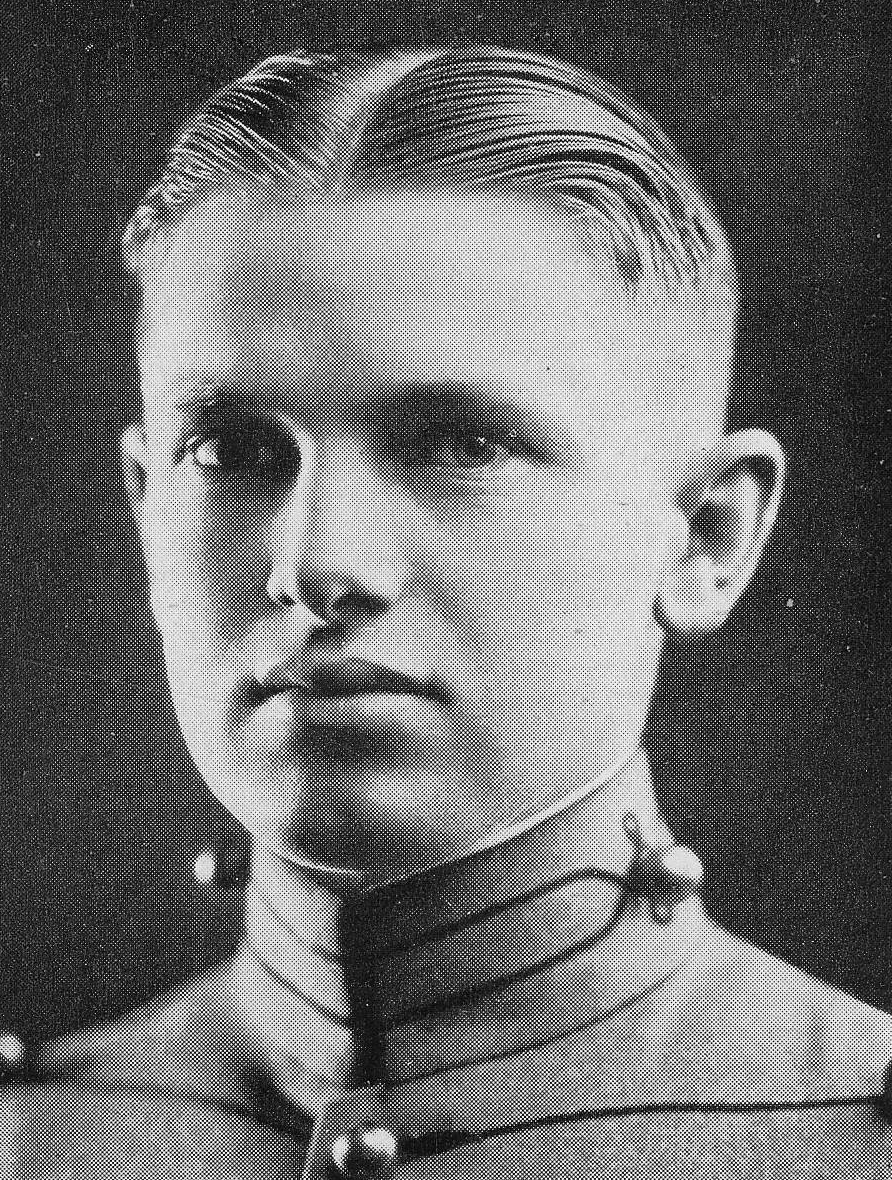
At West Point in 1923

Born in Concord, New Hampshire, on January 26, 1902, Laurence Craigie grew up in Concord, Somerville, Massachusetts and Keene, New Hampshire. He graduated from Stoneham, Massachusetts High School in 1919, and the U.S. Military Academy in June 1923, being commissioned a second lieutenant in the Air Service. He took flying training at Brooks Field and Kelly Field, Texas, and was a flying instructor at both places. He was promoted to first lieutenant in December 1927.

== Service ==
In February 1929, Craigie went to France Field, Panama Canal Zone, where he was an Engineering Officer with the 7th Observation Squadron. He returned to Brooks in May 1931 and went to Randolph Field, Texas the following October for varied assignments. In 1935, Craigie graduated as a captain from the Air Corps Engineering School at Wright-Patterson Air Force Base Ohio, Training and Transport Engineering Unit of the Materiel Division there.

He was named assistant chief of the Engineering Section in July 1937. In June 1939, he graduated from the Army Industrial College and assigned as assistant executive of the Experimental Engineering Section at Wright-Patterson with rank of major. He then attended the Air Corps Tactical School at Maxwell Field, Alabama, graduating in March 1941. Named assistant of the Aircraft Projects Branch at Wright-Patterson he became chief of the branch in July 1941 and was promoted lieutenant colonel that November.

In October 1942, Craigie, then a colonel, became the first pilot of the Armed Forces to fly a jet-propelled plane when he piloted the XP-59 on its initial flight at Muroc Dry Lake, California, March 1943 he was assigned briefly to the 1st Fighter Command at Mitchel Field, New York, and the following month took command of the Boston Air Defense Wing in Massachusetts. Three months later he commanded the New York Fighter Wing and was advanced to brigadier general in September.

That November he returned to Mitchel as commanding general of the 87th Fighter Wing. He went to Corsica in the North African Theater in March 1944 as commander of the 12th Air Force's 63rd Fighter Wing. He was in command when the invasion of southern France was launched from Corsica in August 1944. In November 1944, he was back at Wright-Patterson as deputy chief of the Air Technical Service's Engineering Division. He became chief of the division in August 1945 and was promoted to major general in July 1946.

In 1947, he became chief of the Research and Engineering Division at Headquarters Army Air Force. That October he was appointed Director of Research and Development under the deputy chief of staff for material at Headquarters U.S. Air Force, and the following September returned to Wright-Patterson as commandant of the U.S. Air Force Institute of Technology. During the first year of the Korean War Craigie became vice commander of the Far East Air Forces in Tokyo, and for three months in 1951 served as the Air Force delegate on the United Nations Armistice Negotiations Team at the truce talks. In November 1951, he returned to U.S. Air Force Headquarters in Washington as Deputy Chief of Staff for Research and Development. He was promoted to lieutenant general July 5, 1952. In April 1954, he took command of NATO's Allied Air Forces Southern Europe (Italy, Greece and Turkey), at Naples, Italy.

== Awards ==
Craigie received the Air Medal and two awards of the Legion of Merit for his World War II service. He received the Silver Star, Distinguished Flying Cross and two awards of the Distinguished Service Medal for his Korean War service.

== In retirement ==
Following a heart attack in the Bavarian Alps, he retired from the Air Force on June 30, 1955. In December, he and his wife Victoria moved to Burbank, California, where he began a 25-year career in private industry. In 1956, he was a vice president of Hydro-Aire, Inc, and the following year a vice president of American Machine & Foundry Co. From 1957 to 1964 he was director of the Air Force requirements section for Lockheed Aircraft Corp.

Since 1963, he was a director of the Flying Tiger Line (a freight airline), and was on the board of Hungry Tiger, Inc. He was also on the board of directors of the Falcon Foundation since 1965. In 1971, he was with the International Science Foundation. He was self-employed as a consultant after 1971.

In May 1990, he and his wife moved into a retirement community for retired service people in Riverside, California, where he died on February 27, 1994. He was cremated, and his ashes were divided between West Point Cemetery and the United States Air Force Academy Cemetery.

== Family ==
Laurence Craigie's brother, Second Lieutenant Karl Harrold Craigie (1898–1973), A.S.A., U.S.A., was a World War I aviator. His other brother also served during the Great War—Hugh H. Craigie, Corp., Co. L, 33d U.S. (Reg.) Infantry. He was also the grandfather of folk singer John Craigie.
