= DRDC Valcartier =

Canadian military research installation

DRDC Valcartier is a major Canadian military research station at Canadian Forces Base Valcartier, Quebec, one of nine centres making up Defence Research and Development Canada (DRDC).

Originally formed at the end of World War II in 1945 as the Canadian Armament Research and Development Establishment (CARDE), the intent was to keep the research teams built up during the war in Canada, as opposed to moving to the United States.

Starting in 1951 CARDE implemented a major missile development program, eventually delivering two combat systems, the Velvet Glove air-to-air missile and the Heller anti-tank rocket. Neither was accepted for production, but the basic research was used with local defence contractors to build up familiarity with the new technologies.

Starting in 1955 a serious effort to equip Canada with a useful anti–ballistic missile system was undertaken, along with research into the problems of detection and tracking, hypersonic flight, and fuels suitable for use in an interceptor missile. As part of this project a lengthy study of the upper atmosphere was undertaken from instrumented balloons. Another development from this era was the use of gun-fired models for high-speed testing, instead of using a wind tunnel. Led by Gerald Bull, the sabot–based system would go on to be used in Project HARP during the early 1960s. The early portions of the 1960s was taken up developing a series of increasingly powerful high-acceleration solid rocket propellants, and to test them they designed and built a test vehicle that would later become the Black Brant sounding rocket. Due to this research CARDE was later involved in the design of a US-Canada-Mexico meteorological sounding rocket, the Metroc. The ABM research eventually wound down with no working system in place, however the solid fuels developed during the program were widely used for rocketry in various western military systems.

CARDE then looked into using the new propellant as the basis for a new motor for existing 2.75-inch air-to-ground rockets. The result was the CRV-7 rocket, which had roughly twice the speed of the existing US design, and with enough energy to be able to puncture Warsaw Pact aircraft hangars. Production started at Bristol Aerospace in 1974, and the CRV-7 has been used by the Canadian and other air forces since that time.

In 1969 a re-alignment from pure research to smaller projects directly requested by the Armed Forces took place, along with a change of name to Defence Research Establishment Valcartier (DREV) and a general downsizing of the station and its budgets. Since then DREV has undertaken numerous projects in the field of battlefield command and control, detection and monitoring, and various battlefield decoy systems.

On April 1, 2000, DREV was renamed "Defence R&D Canada – Valcartier" when the overseeing organisation became the Defence Research and Development Canada agency.

== See also ==
Other DRDC locations in Canada:

- DRDC Corporate – Ottawa, Ontario
- DRDC Atlantic – Dartmouth, Nova Scotia
- DRDC Centre for Operational Research and Analysis (CORA) – Ottawa, Ontario
- DRDC Ottawa – Ottawa, Ontario
- DRDC Suffield – CFB Suffield, Alberta
- DRDC Toronto – Toronto, Ontario
