= Bruce Aikenhead =

Canadian aerospace engineer and physicist (1923–2019)

Bruce Alexander Aikenhead (September 22, 1923 – August 5, 2019) was a Canadian aerospace engineer and physicist. Aikenhead was widely regarded as a major pioneer in the Canadian aerospace industry, who was the deputy program director for the program that developed the Canadarm, was the first director-general of the Canadian astronaut program, and helped create flight simulators for the Avro Arrow project.

== Biography ==
Aikenhead was born in Didsbury, Alberta, in 1923, and was raised in London, Ontario after moving there with his family as a young child. During the Second World War, he helped service radar equipment in the Royal Canadian Air Force. After the war, he enrolled at the University of Western Ontario and earned a degree in radio physics. He got married in 1947, at age 24. In 1955, he began working at Canadian Aviation Electronics where he helped create aircraft simulators, and in 1958, he relocated to Malton, Ontario where he helped develop Avro Arrow flight simulators for Avro Canada. That flight simulator program was cancelled six months later, and Aikenhead was soon working for NASA. There, he helped with the training of astronauts on the Mercury mission and also helped develop simulators for the spacecraft used in the mission. When the NASA human space flight program moved to Houston, he left NASA and rejoined Canadian Aviation Electronics, but he quickly returned to the space sector; he began working with Gerald Bull, a scientist at McGill University, in 1966. After he left in 1967 when the funding for the program he was working on was withdrawn, he began at RCA Canada where he helped engineer the ISIS 2 spacecraft and other satellites and spacecraft. In 1981, he became the deputy program director for what became the Canadarm project at the National Research Council of Canada. He was instrumental in the process that chose the first Canadian astronaut, Marc Garneau. He later became the first director-general of the Canadian astronaut program. He retired in 1993, and in 1997 he was awarded the Order of Canada. His wife died in 2005. He was instrumental in the founding of the Okanagan Science Centre in Vernon, British Columbia. On August 5, 2019, he died of natural causes at the age of 95.
