= Velvet Glove =

- Type: Air-to-air missile
- Place of origin: Canada

Service history
- Used by: Royal Canadian Air Force (Testing only)

Production history
- Designed: 1948–1951
- Manufacturer: Canadair
- Produced: 1952 (Limited production for testing)

The Velvet Glove was a short-range semi-active radar homing air-to-air missile designed by CARDE (today DRDC Valcartier) and produced by Canadair starting in 1953. 131 Velvet Gloves had been completed when the program was terminated in 1956, officially because of concerns about its ability to be launched at supersonic speeds from the Avro Arrow then under design, but also from the design being overtaken by developments in the United States.

== Design and construction ==
Small scale work on what would become the Velvet Glove started in 1948 at CARDE, and by 1951 the plans were advanced enough to put forth the design as armament on the Avro CF-100 "Canuck" fighter that was then entering service with the Royal Canadian Air Force (RCAF). Canadair was selected as the manufacturer, and Westinghouse was commissioned to build the radar guidance unit. The final missile design was about ten feet (3.0 m) long and just under a foot in diameter. It used four fins at the tail for steering, and was guided by a semi-active radar located behind a conical nose cone. Westinghouse's microwave radar proximity fuze fired the 60-pound (27 kg) warhead.

== Testing ==
To test the aerodynamics of the missile, instead of building an expensive supersonic wind tunnel, CARDE used a method developed by Gerald Bull and others of firing sabot-equipped test models down a specially-constructed 1,000-yard (910 m) range. The models were fired through a series of stations located at 100-yard (91 m) intervals, each equipped with a metal-coated "jump card". The position and shape of the resulting holes in the cards indicated whether or not the missile was flying stably. The metallic coating on the cards triggered a timer, to measure velocity. One of the stations was also equipped for Schlieren photography, to make a permanent record of shock waves around the model. To reconcile conflicting needs for high pressure to burn the propellant efficiently, and lower pressure to accelerate the model and sabot without destroying them, the gun used a high–low system chamber. A drilled plate limited the rate at which the propellant gases reached the round. This basic design would be key to Project HARP and many of Bull's later concepts.

In 1952 ground-launched testing started at the Picton Range, a small test site set up outside Picton, Ontario, near the RCAF base at Trenton, Ontario. Air launches from a CF-100 started in 1954, with the aircraft flying from Trenton to fire over Picton. The site was later used to launch models of the Avro Arrow for aerodynamics testing. Testing of the Velvet Glove then moved to an operational setting at Cold Lake, Alberta. By this point the Arrow was slated to replace the CF-100 within a few years, and the RCAF had always demanded that it fire the much more advanced active-radar Sparrow II missile under design for the United States Navy. Interest in the Velvet Glove waned, as the Sparrow outperformed it in all ways.

== Cancellation ==
The cancellation of the program led to serious questions in the House of Commons of Canada. Development had cost a total of $24 million (equivalent to $270,000,000 in 2023) which the Department of National Defence attempted to justify as money well spent on the training of the specialists involved in the project. The opposition pointed out that this amounted to $60,000 per specialist, which was considered excessive.

The Sparrow II ran into lengthy delays, and the United States Navy eventually gave up on the design, turning to the simpler semi-active radar homing Sparrow III. Options for the Arrow were studied, including taking over the Sparrow II program at Canadair, turning to the Falcon/rocket mix being used by contemporary United States Air Force interceptors, or restarting the Velvet Glove project. There were concerns that the Velvet Glove would be difficult to launch at supersonic speeds and therefore representing a risk to the aircraft, likely due to its small control surfaces not having enough authority. In the end Canadair was instructed to take over the Sparrow II, ending development of the Velvet Glove for good. When the Arrow project was later canceled, work on the Sparrow II also ceased. The Picton Range closed in 1957.

The National Air Force Museum of Canada in Trenton, Ontario has a full-sized model of the Velvet Glove missile, as well as an actual test model with sabot. The latter was designed to be fired from a 5.5-inch (14 cm) medium artillery barrel (smooth-bored to 5.9 inches, 15 cm).
