= Edenvale, Ontario =

Edenvale
- Unincorporated rural community
- Location within Canada Location within Ontario
- Coordinates: 44°27′03″N 79°54′07″W
- Country: Canada
- Province: Ontario
- County: Simcoe
- Township: Springwater
- Time zone: UTC-5 (Eastern (EST))
  - Summer (DST): UTC-4 (EDT)
- GNBC Code: FBBQU

Edenvale is an unincorporated place in Springwater Township, Simcoe County, Ontario, Canada.

It is located on Ontario Highway 26. The Nottawasaga River flows through Edenvale.

Little remains today of the once a thriving pioneer settlement.

== Early history ==
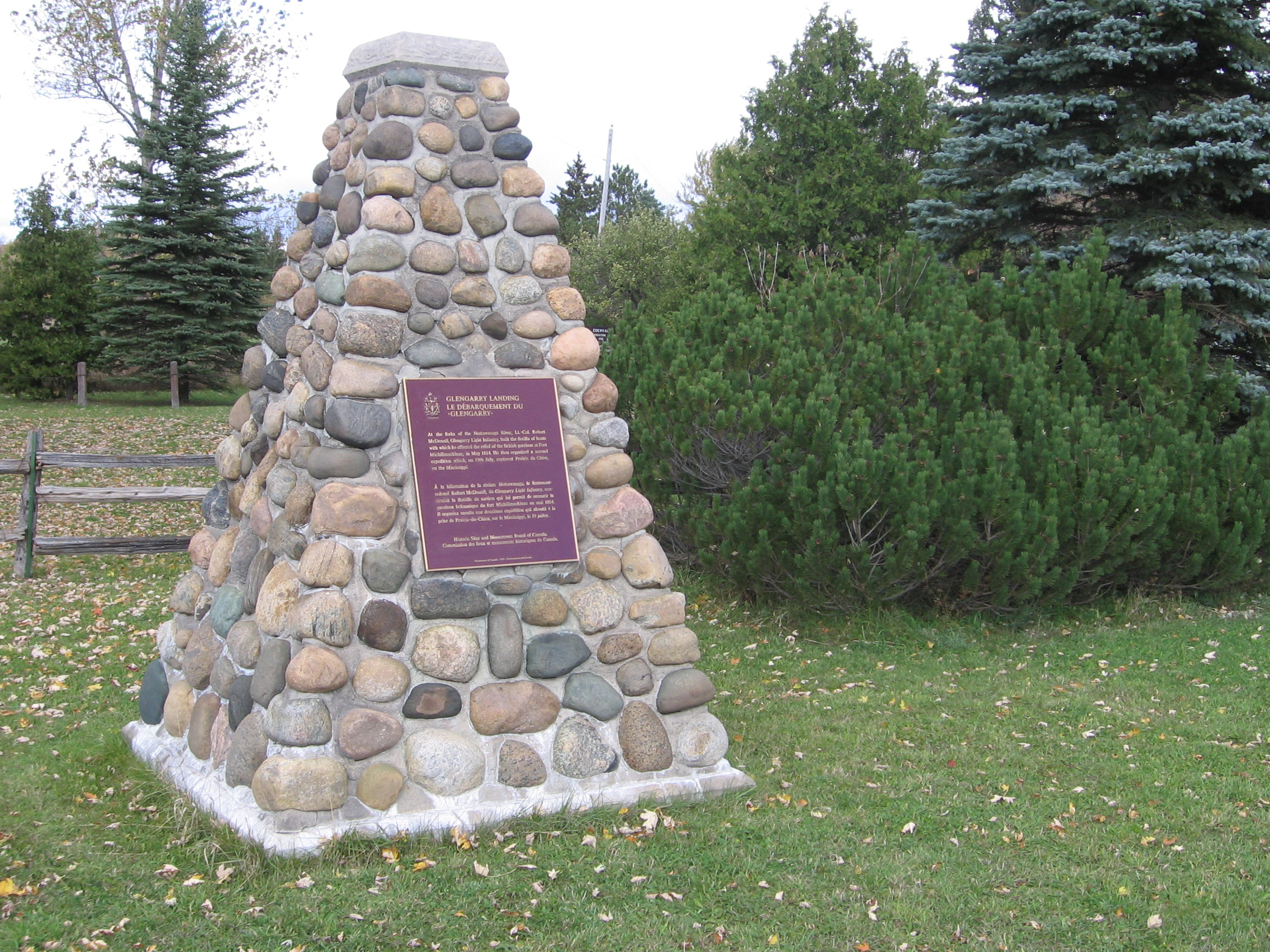
Stone cairn marking the location of the Glengarry Landing National Historic Site

The village was named by pioneer settler John Culham, who described the surrounding countryside as the Garden of Eden. Other names from the early days of Edenvale include Giffen, McNabb, Walker, Campbell, Thompson, Richardson and Robertson.

Although Edenvale was not settled until 1867, a contingent of soldiers led by Lieutenant Colonel Robert McDouall spent a winter encamped at what was then called Glengarry Landing during the War of 1812. The approximate site on the west bank of the Nottawasaga River and along the northside of Ontario Highway 26 was marked by cairn and marker in 1923. The soldiers were making the arduous journey from Kingston to the British post on Michilimackinac Island.

The first permanent inhabitants of Edenvale in 1867 were the Coughlin, Lavery and Nicholson families. At the time, Edenvale extended south to the Minesing Swamp, west to the Vespra-Sunnidale Town line, north to Concession 2 of Flos Township and east to Concession 11 of Vespra Township. Edenvale had very fertile soil, producing wheat, grain, clover seeds and peas, as well as supporting livestock and a flourishing lumber industry.

== Late 19th century village ==
In 1876, a fire destroyed a significant part of Edenvale and many homes constructed after that time were built with lumber that had noticeable burn scars on them.

Several lumber mills sprung up in Edenvale. The Keeley family established Keeley's Mill in 1881 on the Nottawasaga River north of the Vespra-Flos Townline. The Methodist church in the village was built with lumber milled and donated by the Keeley family. The mill burned down in 1888.

In 1886, John Pilkey opened a shingle mill in Edenvale. Two years later, a sawmill was also opened east of Sideroad 25-26. The mill burned to the ground three times between 1890 and 1929 and was not rebuilt after the last fire. Carter's Mill was opened by the Carter Brothers in 1895. Situated on the south side of the Edenvale bridge over the Nottawasaga River, it operated until 1906. Other industries and businesses included Lovering's Mill (a winter operation only), Tallman's Cheese Factory, Bennett's Creamery, Graham Blacksmith Shop and Campbell Slaughterhouse.

The first store was opened by Fred and Frank Mercer in 1881. The Edenvale post office opened in 1908, with Stephen Elliott as the first Postmaster. Elliott also operated the General Store and the telephone exchange. Prior to the opening of the post office, residents had to go to Sunnidale Corners or Stayner for postal services.

== Village schools ==
Edenvale had two schools: SS #10 East, opened in 1883 on Concession 12 in Vespra Township and SS #10 West, opening in 1895 on Concession 14 in Vespra Township. SS #10 East closed in January 1949 as there were only two students. The school re-opened in 1953 with 12 students. SS #10 West closed around the same time and all students attended #10 East until it closed again in 1960. SS #10 East remains in its original location and is now a private residence. SS #10 West was demolished many years ago. Some of the expenses from the school's 1883-1895 logbook were $0.15 for a fool's cap; $5.50 for a school bell; $1.00 for the stove; $67.50 for seats; $7.00 for the teacher's desk.

== Village churches ==
Edenvale also had two churches: the Methodist Church, built in 1881 and the Presbyterian, built across the road from the Methodist in 1900. The Presbyterian church, officially named the Century Presbyterian Church of Edenvale, closed in 1966 and was demolished in 1976. A miniature replica of the church sits on a post in front of the former church property.

The Methodist Church closed in 1918. From 1921 to 1941, the former church was used by the United Farmers Union as a union hall. It then became the Edenvale Community Centre. Extensive renovations were done on the building using wood from the former SS #9 schoolhouse in Flos Township. The building was closed and demolished in 1998. The property is now Edenvale Park, a small passive park featuring two wooden benches and a plaque commemorating the Methodist Church of Edenvale.

== Civic history ==
An Edenvale Women's Institute was founded in 1908 by Miss Susie Campbell. In 1938, Edenvale hosted the first International Plowing Match to be held in Simcoe County, with a then record 132,000 in attendance. In 1940, the Royal Canadian Air Force built an airfield nearby. Although it was just across the Flos / Sunnidale Townline in Sunnidale Township, it was named RCAF Detachment Edenvale. Hydroelectricity came to Edenvale in 1946. The Edenvale 4-H Club was founded in 1950.

== Today ==
Little remains of the once vibrant community. For many years, the most prominent feature of the former village was the Edenvale Garage & Motor Sales on Highway 26, at the centre of the former village, but this has since closed.

Several active farms also remain, along with the aforementioned SS #10 East schoolhouse, and the Strongville Gospel Church, a congregation that has existed for 100 years. The church remains in the same location on Strongville Road, but not in its original building. That building was moved just north to the intersection of Strongville Road and Sunnidale Concession Road 9, and now makes up part of a private residence. That private residence is also home to the first & original post office where the back portion of the building still stands today.

A cairn commemorating the Glengarry Landing stands at the entrance to the Edenvale Conservation Area, run by the Nottawasaga Valley Conservation Authority.
