= Edenvale Airport =

- IATA: none; ICAO: none; TC LID: CNV8

Summary
- Airport type: Public
- Operator: Edenvale A/D
- Location: Edenvale, Ontario
- Time zone: EST (UTC−05:00)
  - Summer (DST): EDT (UTC−04:00)
- Elevation AMSL: 718 ft / 219 m
- Coordinates: 44°26′20″N 079°57′55″W
- Website: www.edenflight.com

Map
- Location in Ontario

Runways
Direction	Length		Surface
Direction	ft	m	Surface
08/26	3,014	919	Asphalt
13/31	3,936	1,200	Asphalt
17/35	1,900	579	Turf
- Source: Canada Flight Supplement

Edenvale Airport (TC LID: CNV8) is a registered aerodrome located 2.8 nautical miles (5.2 km; 3.2 mi) west of Edenvale, Ontario, Canada.

== History ==
=== RCAF and World War II airfield 1940–1946 ===
From 1940 to 1945 it was known as RCAF Detachment Edenvale (No. 1 Relief Landing Field) as an emergency relief field supporting Camp Borden and used by the British Commonwealth Air Training Plan's No. 1 Service Flying Training School. After 1946 the RCAF buildings at Edenvale were demolished and the site abandoned.

==== Aerodrome information ====
In approximately 1942 the aerodrome was listed as RCAF Aerodrome - Edenvale, Ontario at 44°26′N 79°58′W with a variation of 8 degrees west and elevation of 700 ft (210 m). Three runways were listed as follows:

Runway name	Length	Width	Surface
3/21	2,900 ft (880 m)	100 ft (30 m)	Hard surfaced
8/26	2,400 ft (730 m)	100 ft (30 m)	Hard surfaced
14/32	2,500 ft (760 m)	100 ft (30 m)	Hard surfaced

=== Civilian use 1950–1959 ===
In 1950 the airport became a civilian aerodrome, but for almost a decade it was mostly used for race car events and was referred to as Stayner or Edenvale Raceway. It was abandoned again in 1959.

=== Canadian Army 1962–1988 ===
The Canadian Army took over the site in 1962 and referred to it as Edenvale Transmitter Station Bunker, a remote radio communications station to support the Cold War effort (see Emergency Government Headquarters). The military closed the station in 1988, left by 1994 and the bunker was sealed off.

=== Civilian use 2002–present ===
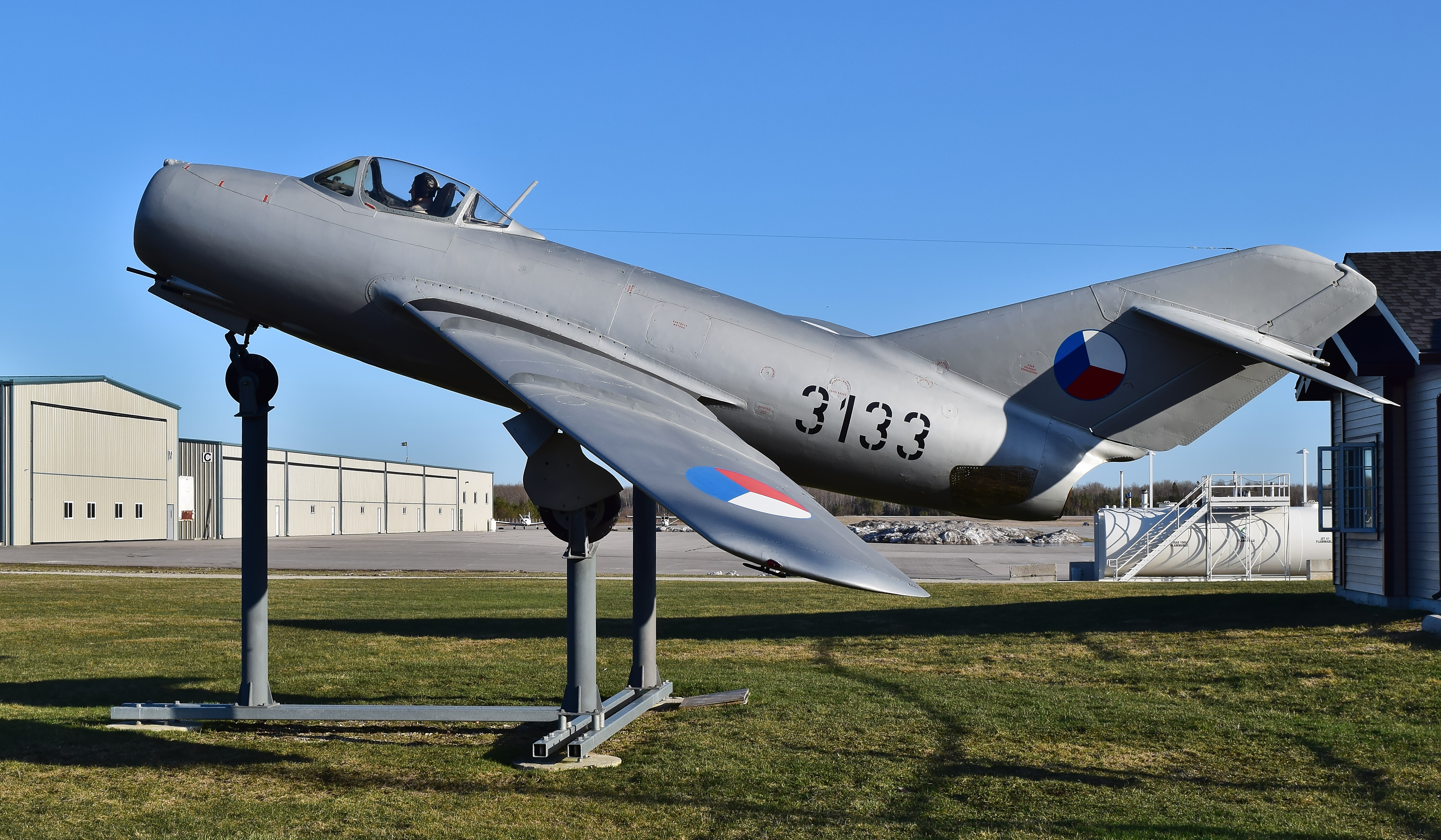
The MiG-15bisSB displayed at the Edenvale Airport

Since 2002, the airfield has operated as a private civilian aerodrome.

At the northeast end of the airfield is an ex-Czechoslovak MiG-15bisSB on static display.

In November 2018 it was announced that the Canadian Air and Space Museum, which was forced out of Downsview Park in Toronto, will reopen at Edenvale Airport in 2019 and be renamed the Canadian Air & Space Conservancy.
