= Heller (antitank rocket) =

Heller Anti-tank Rocket Luncher
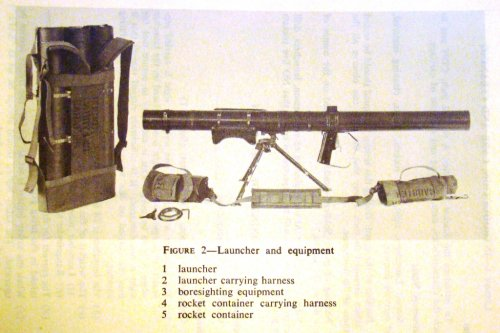
- Type: Recoilless Rocket Anti-Tank Weapon
- Place of origin: Canada

Service history
- In service: 1954-1967
- Used by: Canadian Armed Forces

Production history
- Designer: Placeholder
- Designed: Placeholder
- Produced: 1954-1967

Specifications
- Mass: 15.2kg (33.5 lb)
- Length: 137.2cm (54 inches)
- Rate of fire: ~5 rpm
- Muzzle velocity: 715 ft/s
- Effective firing range: 450 yards
- Maximum firing range: 2,860 yards

The Heller was a Canadian antitank rocket launcher produced and fielded in 1954, replaced by M20 "Super Bazooka" and Carl-Gustaf recoilless rifle after 1967.

== Description ==
The Heller was in production from 1954 and remained in service until 1967. The Heller fired a 3.2-inch (81 mm) high explosive anti-tank projectile that was capable of penetrating 11 inches (280 mm) of rolled homogeneous armor when struck at a 90-degree angle of impact. It replaced the US Bazooka, providing both longer range and greatly increased penetration. It was in turn replaced by the US M20 "Super Bazooka" which had even higher performance and a somewhat simpler setup, and these were in turn replaced by the 84-mm MAW.

== Manual view ==
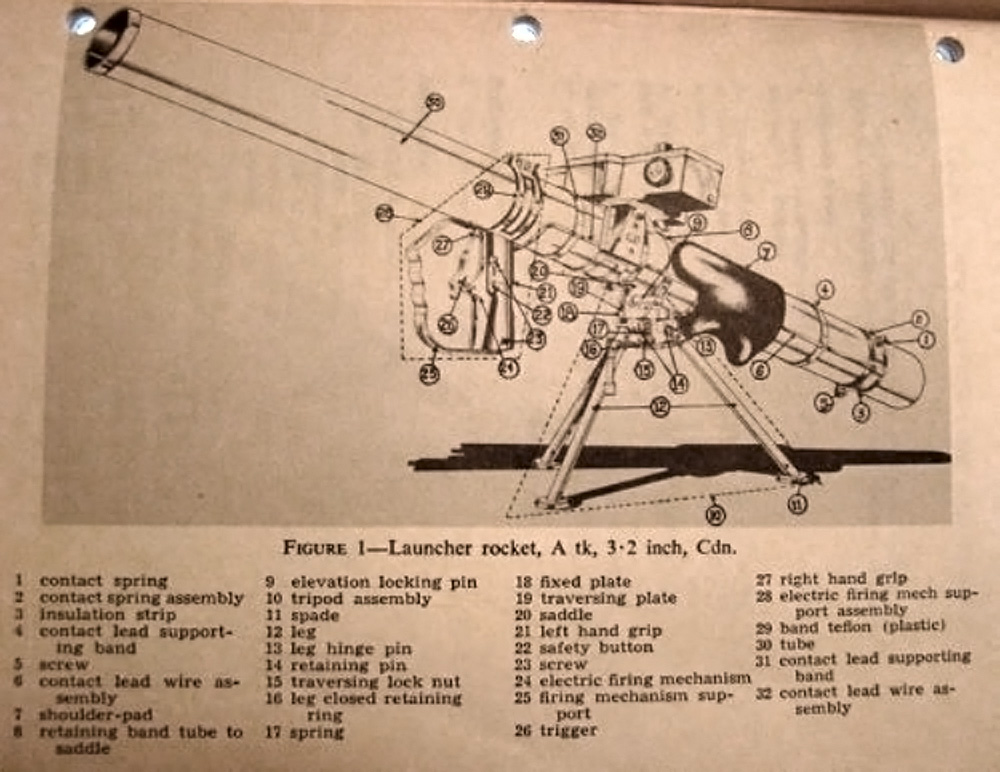

From manual:
Length of launcher: 54 inches
Weight of launcher tube and tripod: approx. 28.5lbs
Weight of rangefinder sight: approx. 5 lbs
HE A tk rocket penetration (homogeneous armour): over 11 inches at 90 degrees, Approx. 5 Inches at 64 degrees angle of strike.

Max range: 2,860 yards
Opening range (first round hit): 300 yards
Maximum effective range: 450 yards
Muzzle velocity: 715 feet per second.
Max rate of fire: 5 rounds per minute.

== Citations and sources ==
- Weeks, John. Men against tanks: a history of anti-tank warfare, Newton Abbot : David and Charles, 1975. ISBN 0715369091.
