= Orval R. Cook =

United States Air Force general (1898–1980)

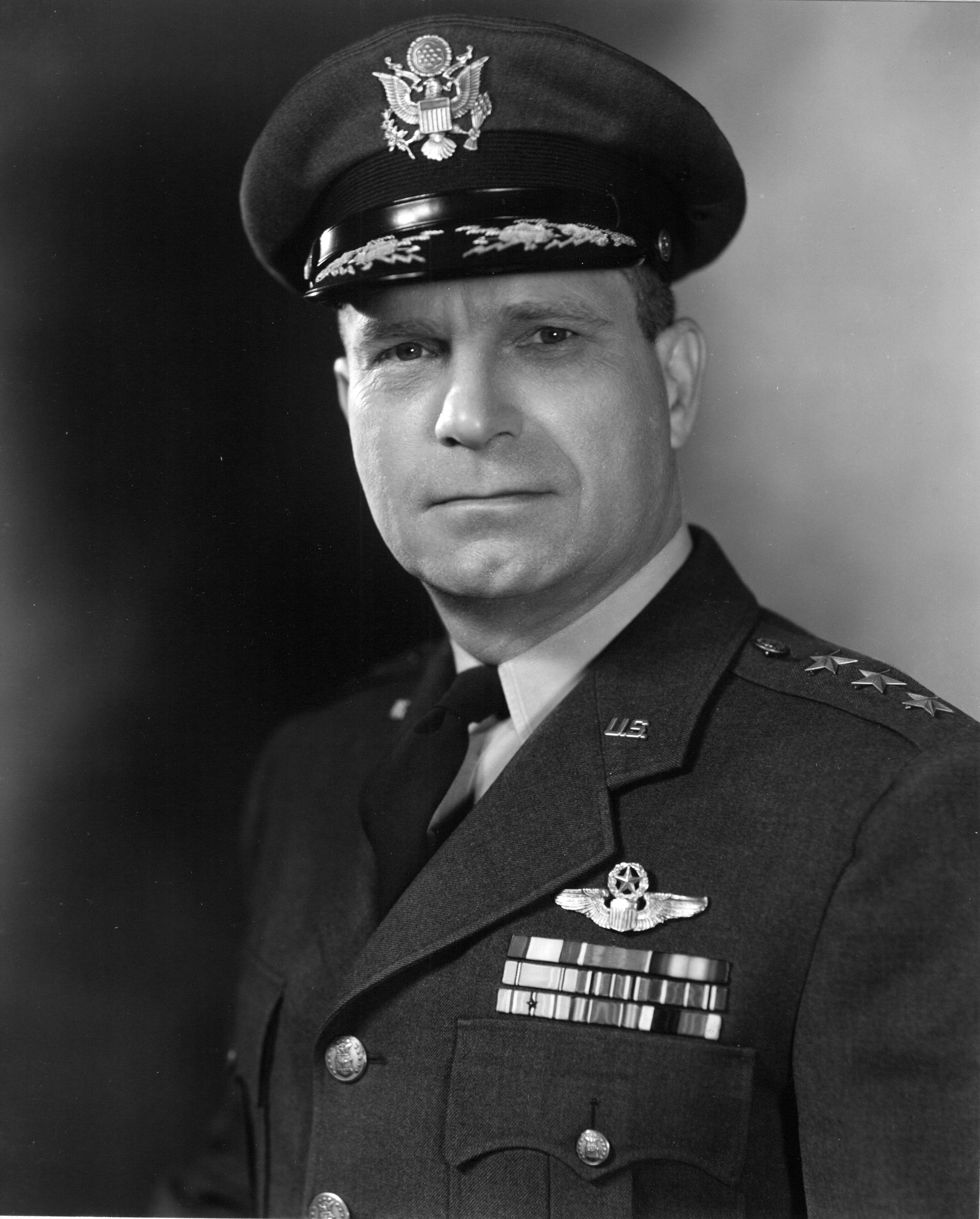
- Portrait of Cook in 1951
- Born: July 27, 1898; West Union, Indiana, US
- Died: March 18, 1980 (aged 81); Falls Church, Virginia, US
- Burial place: Arlington National Cemetery
- Military career
- Allegiance: United States of America
- Branch: United States Air Force
- Service years: 1922–1956
- Rank: General
- Conflicts: World War II
- Awards: Air Force Distinguished Service Medal; Legion of Merit

Orval Ray Cook (July 27, 1898 – March 18, 1980) was a United States Air Force four-star general who served as Deputy Commander in Chief, United States European Command (DCINCEUR) from 1954 to 1956.

== Biography ==
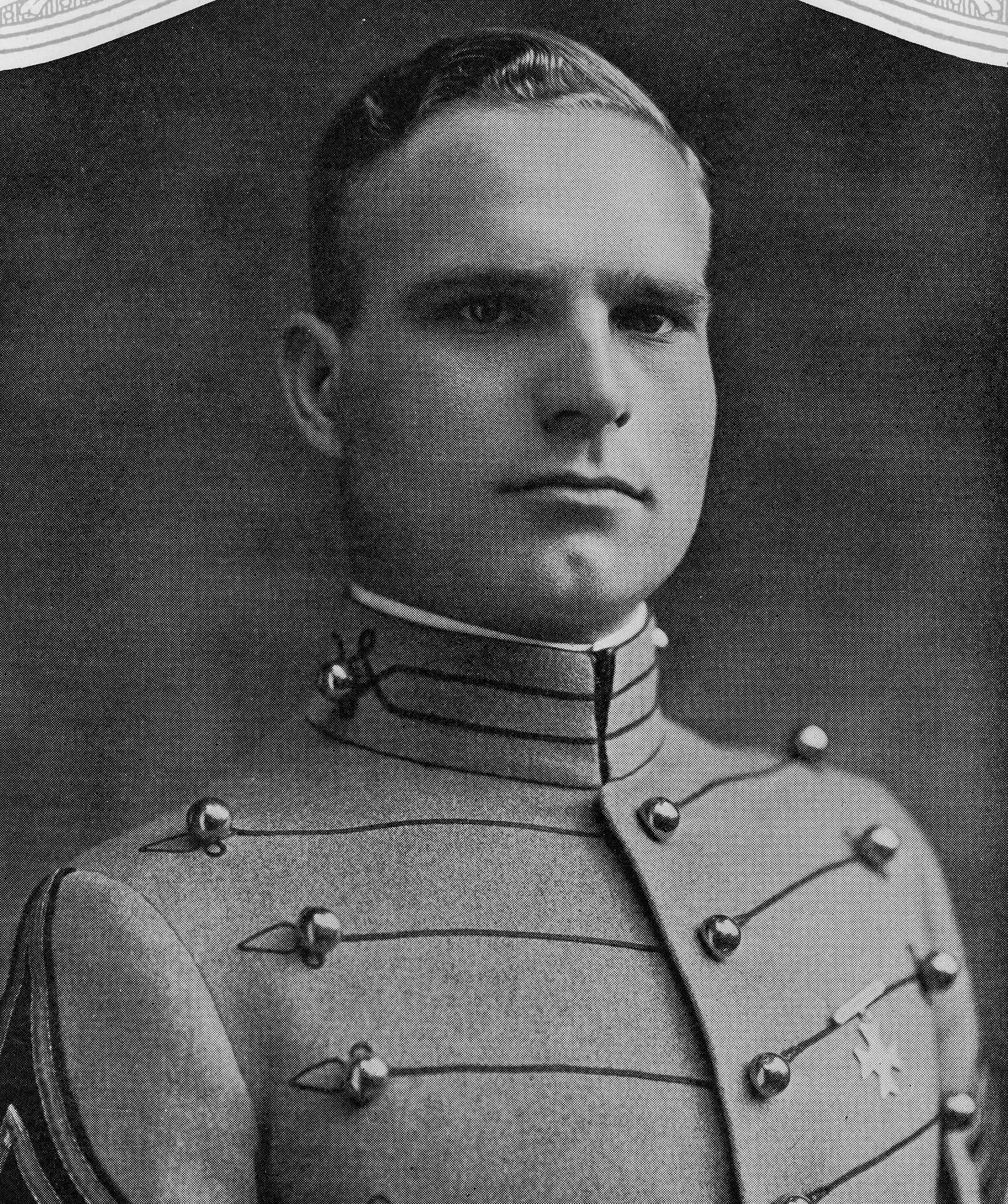
At West Point in 1922

Cook was born July 27, 1898, in West Union, Indiana. He enlisted in the United States Army on October 22, 1918 before being appointed belatedly to the United States Military Academy on November 6, 1918, to fill a cadet vacancy and graduated on June 13, 1922, as a second lieutenant in the Air Service.

Entering Primary Flying School at Brooks Field, Texas, Cook graduated from Advanced Flying School at Kelly Field, Texas in January 1924 and remained there as an instructor. That August he joined the Third Pursuit Squadron at Clark Field in the Philippines. Cook returned to Brooks Field in September 1926 as assistant engineering officer and flying instructor at the Primary Flying School, serving alongside fellow first lieutenant Claire Chennault.

Entering the Air Corps Engineering School at Wright Field, Ohio in June 1929, Cook graduated a year later and was assigned to the Aircraft Branch at Materiel Division Headquarters there as Chief, Propeller Laboratory. He became an instructor at the U.S. Military Academy in June 1934, graduated from the Air Corps Tactical School at Maxwell Field, Alabama, four years later, and from the Command and General Staff School at Fort Leavenworth, Kansas, in June 1939.

Reassigned to the Materiel Center at Wright Field, Cook served with the Engineering Section of the Production Division becoming chief of the section in April 1942. That November he was named district supervisor of the Eastern Procurement District at New York City, and the following May returned to Wright Field as chief of the Production Division.

Ordered to the Southwest Pacific in June 1945, General Cook joined the Far East Air Forces on Okinawa where he established an Air Force Depot and directed Air Force supply and maintenance activities in that area. After cessation of hostilities he was sent to Japan to establish an Air Depot and to assume command of the Seventh Air Service Area Command. Going to Manila in January 1946, he assumed command of the Far East Air Service Command (later redesignated the Pacific Air Service Command).

Assigned to the War Department General Staff, Washington, D.C., in June 1946, Cook became deputy director of the Service, Supply and Procurement Division (later redesignated the Logistics Division) where he was officially transferred from the Army to the Air Force as a major general effective September 26, 1947. Returning to Wright-Patterson Air Force Base, Ohio in July 1948, he was named deputy director of Procurement and Industrial Mobilization Planning, Air Materiel Command, becoming deputy to the commanding general for operations a few weeks later, and director of procurement and industrial planning, Air Materiel Command, in September 1949.

Assigned to the Air Staff in July 1951 as Deputy Chief of Staff for Material and promoted to Lt. General. In this capacity he had responsibility for all USAF industrial planning and procurement matters. He was deeply involved in the acquisition of the B-47 and B-52

Joining the United States European Command on April 1, 1954, Cook was deputy commander in chief, with headquarters at Frankfurt, Germany, moving to Paris, France May 3, 1954.

Cook retired from the Air Force on June 1, 1956, and died on March 18, 1980, at his home in Falls Church, Virginia. His decorations included the Air Force Distinguished Service Medal, Legion of Merit, and World War I Victory Medal. He was rated a command pilot, combat observer, and aircraft observer.

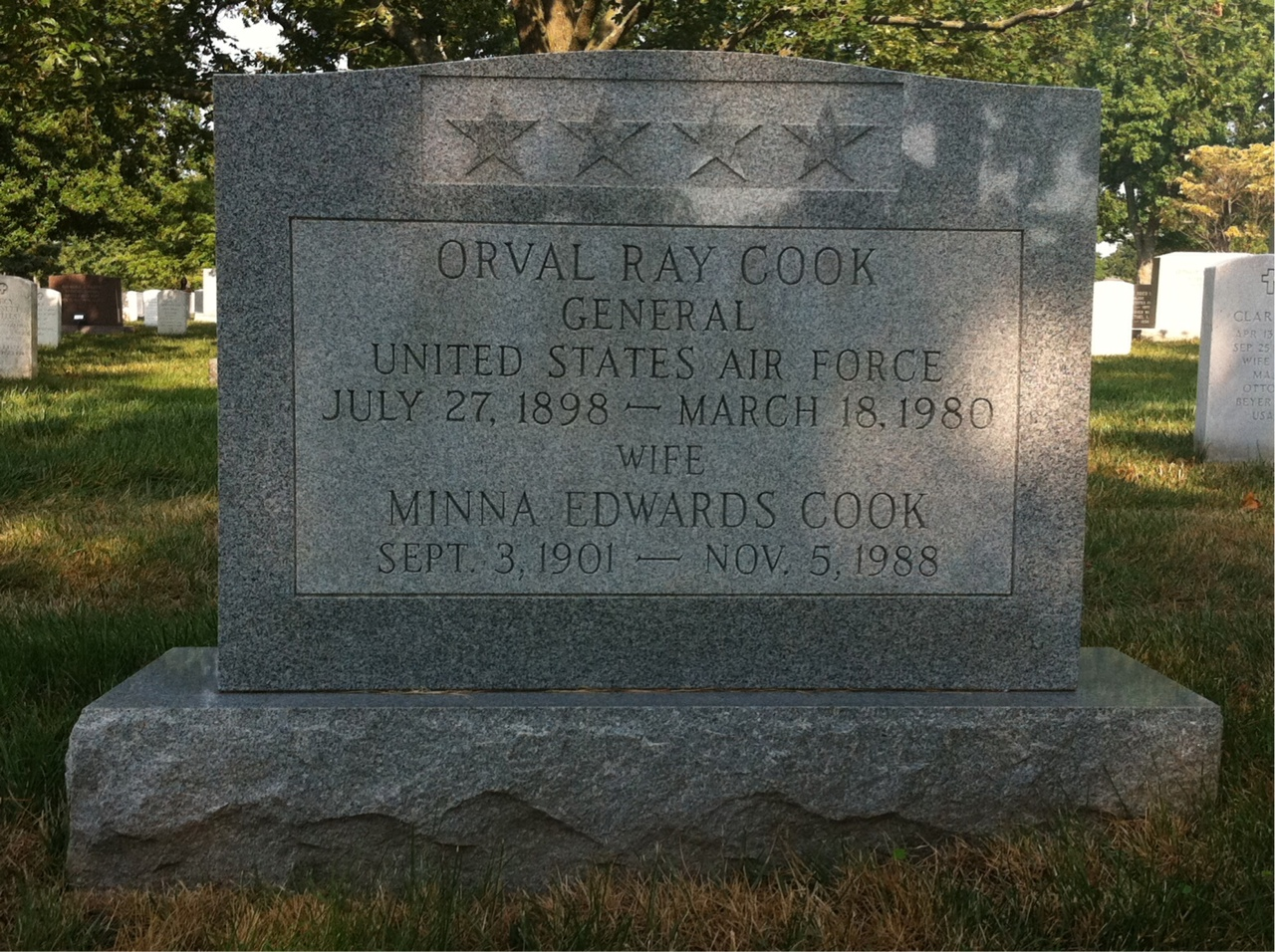
Grave of Cook at Arlington National Cemetery

Orval Cook married Minna Edwards on September 11, 1925, in Manila, Philippines. After her death on November 5, 1988, Minna was buried beside her husband at Arlington National Cemetery. General and Mrs. Cook had three sons.

== Effective dates of promotion ==
Insignia	Rank	Date
	General	April 1, 1954
	Lieutenant general	July 28, 1951
	Major general	March 3, 1944
	Brigadier general	November 8, 1943
	Colonel	March 1, 1942
	Lieutenant colonel	October 12, 1941
	Major	March 1, 1940
	Captain	August 1, 1935
	First lieutenant	May 14, 1927
	Second lieutenant	June 13, 1922
