= Thomas Cooper-Slipper =

British flying ace of WWII (1921–2004)

- Born: 11 January 1921; Kinver, Staffordshire, England
- Died: 23 February 2004 (aged 83); Victoria, British Columbia, Canada
- Military career
- Allegiance: United Kingdom
- Branch: Royal Air Force
- Service years: 1938–1946
- Rank: Squadron Leader
- Conflicts: Second World War: Battle of France; Battle of Britain; Battle of Singapore
- Awards: Distinguished Flying Cross
- Other work: Test pilot Aviation sales representative

Thomas Cooper-Slipper, DFC (11 January 1921 – 23 February 2004) was a British flying ace who served with the Royal Air Force (RAF) during the Second World War. He was credited with having shot down at least ten aircraft.

From Kinver in Staffordshire, Cooper-Slipper joined the RAF in 1938. He was posted to No. 605 Squadron in March 1940 and served with it through its participation in the later stages of the Battle of France and then in the following Battle of Britain, achieving several aerial victories. The following year he instructed for a time and then served with a series of squadrons before joining No. 232 Squadron in Singapore. He achieved further aerial victories in the campaign there and in Sumatra against the Japanese. Wounded as he was being evacuated from Java, he was hospitalised for several months. Once he had recovered, much of the remainder of his war service was spent as a test pilot. After the war, he emigrated to Canada where he was a test pilot for Avro Canada. His flying career ended in 1959 but he continued to work in aviation as a sales representative. He retired in 1986, settling in Victoria, British Columbia, where he died in 2004.

== Early life ==
Thomas Paul Michael Cooper-Slipper was born on 11 January 1921 at Kinver in Staffordshire, England. He was educated at King Edward VI College at Stourbridge and once his education was completed, applied for a short service commission in the Royal Air Force (RAF). His initial flight training commenced in late October 1938 at No. 12 Elementary & Reserve Training School at Prestwick. Accepted into the RAF as a pilot officer on probation, he went to No. 1 RAF Depot at Uxbridge for his induction training and from there went to No. 9 Flying Training School at Hullavington.

== Second World War ==
With his training complete by the time of the outbreak of the Second World War, Cooper-Slipper was posted to No. 74 Squadron on 7 September 1939. He had been confirmed in his pilot officer rank a few days prior. The squadron operated Supermarine Spitfire fighters from Hornchurch as part of the aerial defences for London. Cooper-Slipper was only with the squadron for several weeks before being assigned to No. 2 Ferry Pilot Pool at Filton. In March 1940 he was posted to No. 605 Squadron. This was stationed at Wick from where it was tasked with defending the naval base at Scapa Flow with its Hawker Hurricane fighters.

=== Battle of France ===
On 21 May, following the invasion of France and the Low Countries, the squadron moved south to Hawkinge and the next day commenced flying to the continent as cover for the retreat of the British Expeditionary Force. Cooper-Slipper shared in the destruction of a Heinkel He 111 medium bomber to the southwest of Arras. He shot down a Junkers Ju 87 dive bomber in the same area on 25 May, one of several claimed either destroyed or probably destroyed by pilots of the squadron that day. The next day he destroyed a Junkers Ju 88 medium bomber near Dunkirk.

=== Battle of Britain ===
At the end of the month, No. 605 Squadron went to Drem in Scotland to recoup and refit after its casualties over the previous several days. In early September, as the Battle of Britain escalated, it went back south, this time to Croydon. From there it was scrambled on a daily basis to deal with incoming Luftwaffe bomber raids. On 8 September Cooper-Slipper, who had been promoted to flying officer by this time, destroyed a Messerschmitt Bf 109 fighter and damaged a Dornier Do 17 medium bomber near Maidstone. He damaged a He 111 to the southeast of London on 11 September and the next day shared in the destruction of a Do 17 near Hastings.

On 15 September, now known as Battle of Britain Day, Cooper-Slipper was in an engagement with a Do 17 to the south of Dungeness when he deliberately rammed it after his Hurricane was damaged by machine gun fire. The Do 17 went out of control and crashed while Cooper-Slipper bailed out of his aircraft and landed safely, although without any awareness of how he pulled the ripcord for his parachute. A Bf 109 was damaged by Cooper-Slipper over Canterbury on 27 September. He was duly recognised for his successes over the preceding months with an award of the Distinguished Flying Cross (DFC). The citation was published in late November in The London Gazette and read:

Flying Officer Cooper-Slipper has displayed great skill and daring in air combat. On one occasion he deliberately rammed and destroyed a hostile aircraft after his own controls had been practically shot away. He has destroyed seven enemy aircraft and damaged three others.

— London Gazette, No. 35001, 26 November 1940

In the meantime, Cooper-Slipper was sent to take an instructing course at the Central Flying School at Upavon. In March 1941 he commenced a posting as an instructor to naval aviators and then, in July, went to No. 60 Operational Training Unit at East Fortune for familiarisation with night fighting duties. He was promoted to flight lieutenant in September and posted to No. 96 Squadron, a night fighter unit equipped with the Boulton Paul Defiant, as a commander of one of its flights. He was there for a month before being going back to his previous unit, No. 74 Squadron, and then No. 135 Squadron in November.

=== Battle of Singapore ===
When Cooper-Slipper arrived at No. 135 Squadron it was preparing for a move from its station at Honiley to Burma. He and a group of the squadron's personnel traveled abroad the ship Duchess of Bedford. During its voyage, the Japanese invaded British Malaya and during a stopover at Singapore, Cooper-Slipper and several other pilots were detached to join what became No. 232 Squadron. This was equipped with Hurricanes and heavily engaged in the defence of Singapore, which was being regularly raided by Japanese bombers. On 22 January 1942, he destroyed a pair of Mitsubishi G3M medium bombers over Singapore but in the following days became sick and was hospitalised.

Upon recovery he and the survivors of the squadron were evacuated to Palembang in Sumatra from where it sortied against the Japanese when their forces invaded the island. During early February, Cooper-Slipper destroyed three more bombers although the exact details are not known. When the airfield at Palembang was captured on 14 February, he was made a prisoner of war. However, he escaped that night and with several others made his way to Java. He was wounded when the truck in which he was traveling to Batavia struck a land mine. Evacuated abroad a hospital ship to Sri Lanka, he would receive medical treatment for the next six months.

Cooper-Slipper returned to active duty in late 1942, being posted to No. 103 Maintenance Unit at Aboukir as its chief test pilot. He also took up command of the Special Performance Spitfire Flight. Among its duties was the interception of high-altitude Luftwaffe reconnaissance aircraft and on at least one occasion in 1943, he damaged a Junkers Ju 188. His wounds from Java began to affect his ability to fly at high altitudes and in November he was posted to No. 267 Squadron of Transport Command, which operated the Douglas Dakota. The following unit he returned to test flying for maintenance units in Egypt. He was repatriated to England in November and became the chief test pilot at Lichfield early the following year.

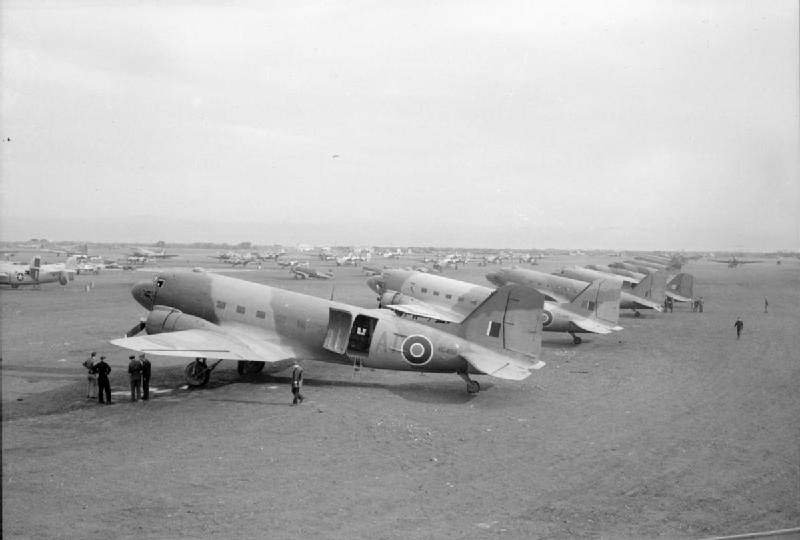
Douglas DC-3's of No. 267 Squadron, 1944

== Postwar period ==
Cooper-Slipper left the RAF in June 1946 and the following year emigrated to Canada. He found employment with Avro Canada as a test pilot, flying a variety of aircraft including the Avro Canada CF-100 Canuck and Canadair Sabre. He worked on a Avro Lancaster project involving Orenda engines and became that company's chief test pilot in 1955. He ended his flying career in 1959 having worked on the Orenda Iroquois engine fitted to a Boeing B-47 Stratojet test bed aircraft. He was employed by the de Havilland concern, selling its aircraft, before working in a similar role for Field Aviation. At the time of his retirement in 1986, Cooper-Slipper worked for Ontario Ministry of Industry and Trade, acting as an ambassador for the province's aircraft manufacturing sector.

== Later life ==
Settling in Victoria, in British Columbia, Cooper-Slipper was inducted into Canada's Aviation Hall of Fame in recognition of his services to the flying industry. He died at the Royal Jubilee Hospital in Victoria on 23 February 2004 and was survived by his wife and a son.

Cooper-Slipper is credited with the destruction of at least ten aircraft, two of which were shared with other pilots, and four damaged.
