= Paul Bernard Dilworth =

Canadian aeronautical engineer (1915–2007)

- Born: 31 January 1915; Toronto, Ontario, Canada
- Died: 18 February 2007 (aged 92); Etobicoke, Ontario, Canada
- Occupation: Aeronautical engineer
- Spouse(s): Olive Dilworth, Yvonne Dilworth
- Children: Geoff Dilworth, Robert Dilworth

Paul Bernard Dilworth (31 January 1915 – 18 February 2007) was an influential Canadian aeronautical engineer and the founder of Dilworth Secord and Meagher Associates Ltd. (DSMA).

As an employee of the National Research Council (NRC) in Ottawa, Dilworth was an executive member of the team involved in England's first jet engine tests in 1942. He served as manager of the NRC Cold Weather Test Site located at Stevensen Field in Winnipeg from September 1943 until May 1946.

In 1946 Paul transferred to Turbo Research, a crown corporation, which was transferred to private industry later that year, purchased by A.V Roe Canada. Paul became the chief engineer in A.V. Roe's gas turbine division where Orenda Engines were developed. He worked on the engine design of the Avro Canada CF-103 (predecessor to the Avro Arrow) for Orenda.

In 1952 he created Paul Dilworth & Company, which in 1958 became Dilworth Secord and Meagher Associates Ltd., or DSMA, an engineering consulting firm of international scale.

== Honours and legacy ==
- Canada's Aviation Hall of Fame (2000)
