= Orenda Engines =

Canadian aircraft engine manufacturer

Orenda Engines was a Canadian aircraft engine manufacturer and parts supplier. As part of the earlier Avro Canada conglomerate, which became Hawker Siddeley Canada, they produced a number of military jet engines from the 1950s through the 1970s, and were Canada's primary engine supplier and repair company.

== History ==
=== Origins ===
The origins of the company stem from World War II. During the war, the National Research Council of Canada ran a small aerodynamics effort similar to NACA in the United States or Royal Aircraft Establishment in the United Kingdom. In 1942 they sent two of their researchers to the UK to take a survey of their efforts and report on what fields of study the Canadians should focus in order to avoid duplication.

Over the next year a number of members of the NRC's aerodynamics lab traveled to the UK, and in May 1943 they published their findings in the top secret Report on Development of Jet Propulsion in the United Kingdom, widely known as the Banks Report. Among their recommendations was the suggestion to form a cold weather testing centre, as up to then jet engines had not been tested in that environment; another suggestion was to form their own engine company as soon as possible.

=== Turbo Research ===
Following the advice of the Report, in March 1944 the government formed Turbo Research as a crown corporation. The company was formally incorporated on 1 July 1944, set up in a disused section of the Research Enterprises Limited factories in Leaside, a neighbourhood of Toronto, Ontario. Several members of the NRC teams that had traveled to the UK during the Report moved to the new company, including K.F. Tupper as chief engineer, Paul Dilworth as chief designer and Winnett Boyd, initially as the combustion engineer, but later as the chief designer.

The team initially studied a series of designs based on the basic Whittle centrifugal-flow design, starting with the TR.1 and growing through the TR.2 to the largest, the TR.3. None of these designs progressed past initial studies however, as the team turned their attention to a new axial-flow design, the TR.4, later known as the Chinook.

=== Avro Canada ===
At about this time, the former Victory Aircraft plants in Malton were being converted into the new A.V. Roe Canada (Avro Canada) plants. In the spring of 1946 the government decided to turn all engine development over to private industry, and sold Turbo Research to Avro. Paul Dillworth remained as chief engineer of the newly minted Gas Turbine Division, which was moved to Avro's plant just outside what is today Toronto Pearson International Airport.

Work on the TR.4, the first Canadian-designed jet engine, continued. Now called the Chinook, it first ran in March 1948, producing 2,600 lbf (12,000 N) thrust. Only three were built before all attention moved to the Orenda.

=== Orenda turbojet ===
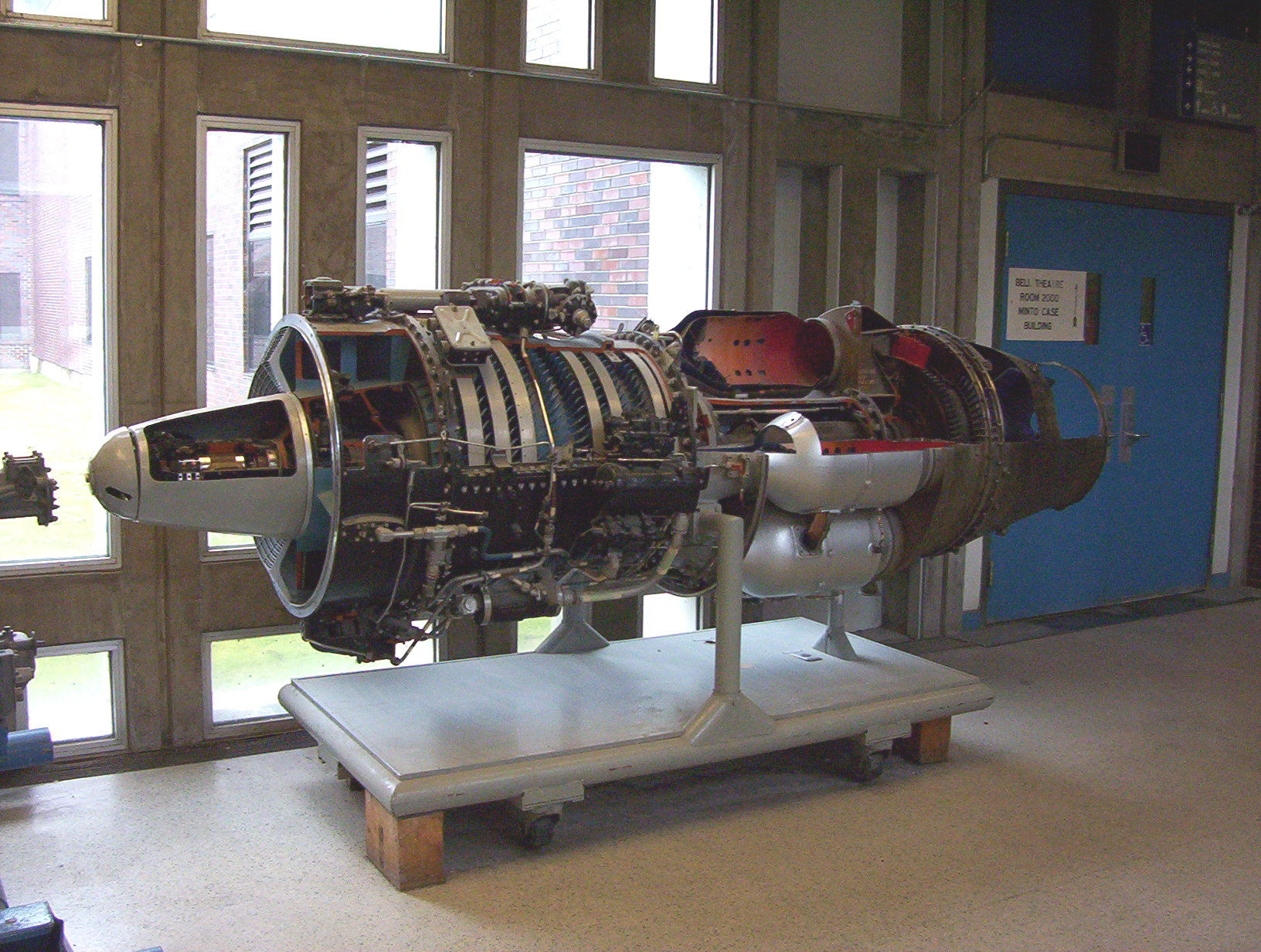
Orenda engine on display at Carleton University

Work on the TR.4 continued through this period, but in the summer of 1946, Avro Canada asked them to produce a new 6,500 lbf (28.9 kN) engine for their CF-100 Canuck interceptor design. The resulting TR.5 Orenda design was essentially a scaled-up Chinook, with work continuing on the latter to bring the production and test teams up to speed.

The Orenda's design was similar enough to the Chinook that prototype production was completed in less than a year, and the engine first ran in February 1949. Testing proceeded quickly at a facility outside Nobel, Ontario, formerly a munitions factory owned by C-I-L. Between the first run in February and the start of production in the late fall, the prototypes ran over 1,000 hours, a record for the era. When it entered production it was the most powerful engine in the world, a title it held until 1952. Almost 4,000 Orenda engines of various versions were built by the time the final unit was delivered to the RCAF in July 1958.

The Orenda entered production for the CF-100, which were used in Canada and the Belgian Air Component. Later versions of the Canadair Sabre also used the Orenda in place of their General Electric J47, providing a dramatic boost in performance, holding the crown for F-86 performance for some time. The Canadair Sabre became a popular export item as well, with versions being sold to the West German, South African, Colombian and Pakistani Air Forces.

=== Orenda Iroquois ===
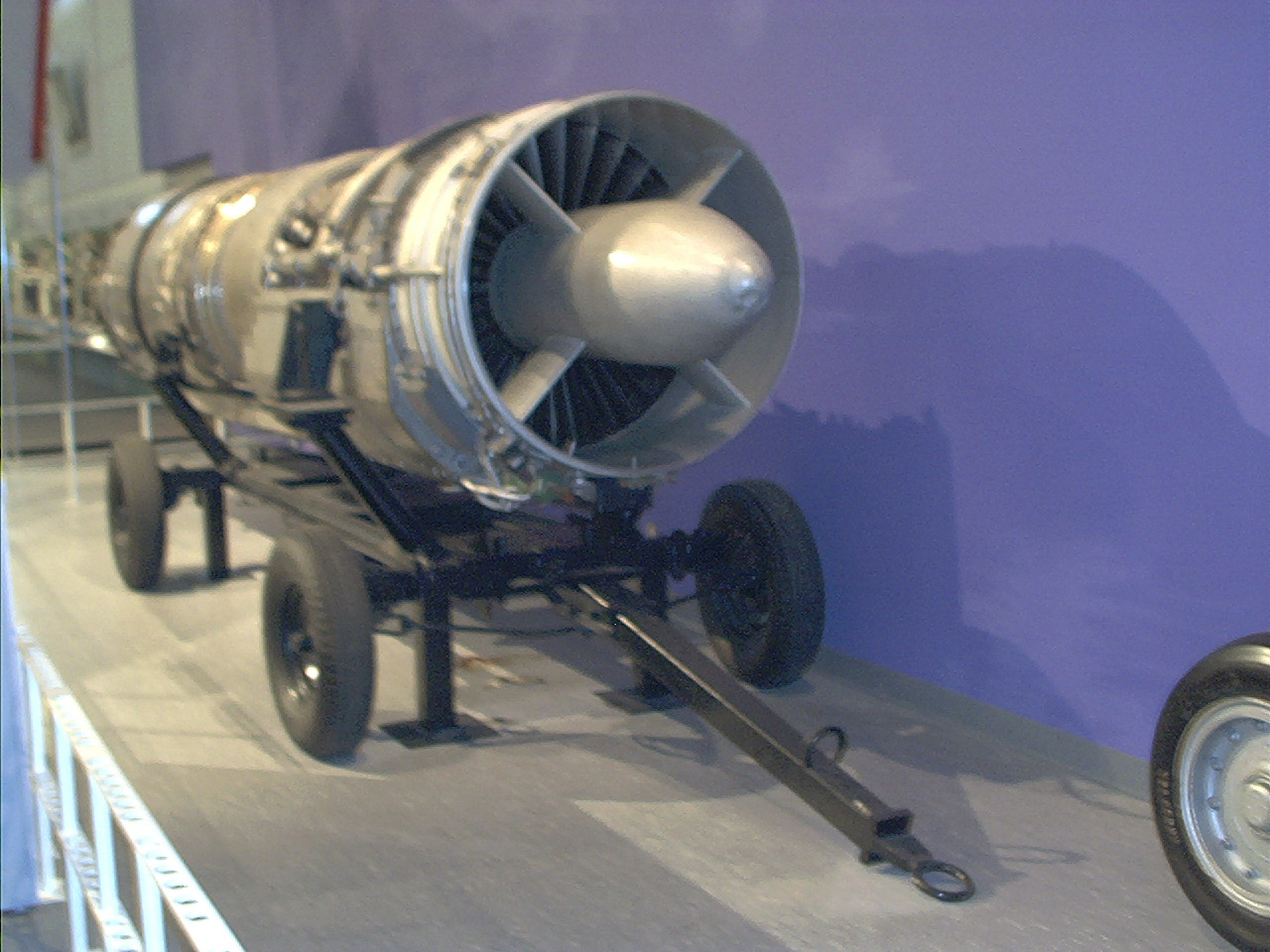
An Orenda Iroquois engine

In 1953, Avro Canada once again turned to Orenda to produce an engine for the CF-105 Arrow project. Avro had originally intended to use one of three different engines from the UK (one produced under license in the US), but all of these projects ran into delays. Orenda quickly responded with the PS.13 Iroquois design. Once again Orenda was able to prototype the new engine in a short period of time, starting development in 1953, completing it in May 1954 and building and running the prototype by December 1954. During the testing period, the Iroquois was the most powerful jet engine in the world, rated at 19,250 lbf (85.6 kN) dry, 25,000 lbf (110 kN) afterburning. It was aerodynamically matched for peak performance at 50,000 feet (15,000 m) altitude and Mach 2 speed. After some 7,000 hours of development testing, up to a simulated altitude of 70,000 feet (21,000 m) and a forward speed of Mach 2.3, the Iroquois program was cancelled, along with the Arrow on 20 February 1959.

=== Orenda Engines ===
In 1955, another reorganization led to the creation of Orenda Engines. Avro Canada would later disappear due to the cancellation of the Arrow, but Orenda had a major engine overhaul business that allowed them to survive.

In late summer 1959, the RCAF selected the Lockheed F-104 Starfighter as their new day fighter, to be built by Canadair. Orenda was given the contract to build its engines, the Government of Canada having already obtained a production licence for the General Electric J79. By December 1960, Orenda had built five of the new engines.

In early 1962, Orenda also won the production contract for the General Electric J85, for use in the Canadair CL-41 Tutor trainer. The first engine, known as the J85-CAN-40, was delivered in September 1963, the last in October 1965. Production of a derivative engine, the afterburning J85-CAN-15, began in 1967 when Canadair was licensed to produce the CF-5 aircraft, a version of the Northrop F-5, for the RCAF. Between June 1967 and May 1974, 609 engines were produced for the Canadian, Netherlands and Venezuelan Air Forces.

Orenda also started manufacturing industrial gas turbine packages for gas compression, oil pumping and electric generation.

=== Orenda Aerospace ===
Magellan Aerospace was formed in the 1980s, primarily from the assets of the Canadian operations of Fleet Aerospace. Over the next few years they aggressively expanded by purchasing a number of Canadian aerospace companies, including Orenda, which they renamed as Orenda Aerospace, now Magellan Repair, Overhaul & Industrial. In addition to producing complete gas turbine engines, the precision manufacture of critical rotating and stationary engine components for leading original equipment manufacturers since the 1970s, including General Electric, Rolls-Royce and Pratt & Whitney.

Orenda Aerospace attempted to bring the Orenda OE600, a new 600 hp general aviation 8-cylinder reciprocating engine, to market in the 1990s. Timing proved poor, and in the post-9/11 market the company put the OE600 "on hold" in 2005 while they concentrated on military contracts. Within a couple of years, TRACE Engines of Midland, Texas, had purchased all rights to the Orenda design.

== Products ==
- Avro Canada Chinook
- Avro Canada Orenda
- Orenda Iroquois

Licensed production

- General Electric J79
- General Electric J85
