= John Carver Meadows Frost =

British aircraft designer

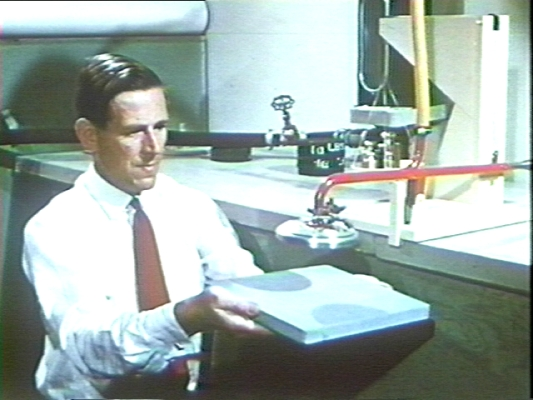
- "Jack" Frost at work in his Avro Canada laboratory (photo: 1952)
- Born: 1915; Walton-on-Thames, England
- Died: 9 October 1979 (aged 63–64); Auckland, New Zealand
- Occupation: Aircraft designer
- Spouse: Joan

John Carver Meadows Frost (1915 in Walton-on-Thames, England – 9 October 1979 in Auckland, New Zealand) was a British aircraft designer. His primary contributions centred on pioneering supersonic British experimental aircraft and as the chief designer who shepherded Canada's first jet fighter project, the Avro Canada CF-100, to completion. He was also the major force behind the Avro Canada VTOL aircraft projects, particularly as the unheralded creator of the Avro Canada flying saucer projects.

== Early life ==
Frost's introduction to aviation had begun when he was a teenager. At school in the early 1930s his Latin teacher A. Maitland Emmet had taken him up in a Bristol Fighter. John Frost had been born in Walton-on-Thames near London in 1915 and had shown an early interest in the sciences at St Edward's School, Oxford, where he graduated with honours in mathematics, chemistry and physics.

== Aviation career ==
=== First designs ===
Frost began his aeronautical career in the 1930s as an apprentice for Airspeed Limited before he moved on to the Miles, Westland, Blackburn and Slingsby companies. In 1937, Frost had designed the fuselage of the new Westland Whirlwind fighter. At Blackburn, he had been involved with the design and construction of their pre-war wind tunnel. While working for Slingsby Sailplanes from 1939 to 1942, he met his future wife, Joan, who had worked in the Slingsby Design Office as a technical artist. Frost designed the Slingsby Hengist, a troop-carrying glider to be used for the Normandy landings. It was not a success and only a few were built but it included an ingenious innovation: the use of a rubber bag undercarriage.

=== de Havilland ===
Frost's work began to be noticed when he joined the de Havilland Aircraft Company (UK), builders of the famed Mosquito bomber and fighter. After joining the de Havilland firm in 1942, Frost had become one of the senior members of the design team working on the Hornet fighter, based on the Mosquito, for which he designed a unique flap design. Later, as one of the team of designers on the D.H.100 Vampire, he was responsible for the design of the original flaps, dive brakes and ailerons for this fighter. The Vampire was the second British jet fighter designed in the Second World War, but other than its powerplant and plywood construction patterned on the Mosquito, the diminutive fighter was mainly conventional in design.

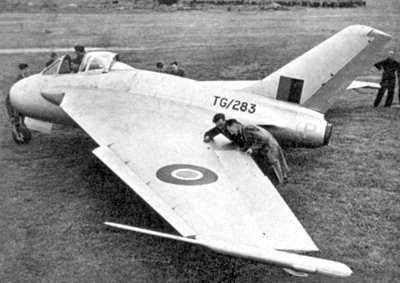
The first DH. 108 built – TG283. The torpedo-shaped objects on the wing tips are containers for anti-spin parachutes

=== de Havilland DH.108 Swallow ===
Frost had then become heavily involved in new developments at the time, that being swept wings and a tailless configuration on a supersonic jet fighter. Designer and company founder, Sir Geoffrey de Havilland, had already begun the D.H.106 Comet development process and was considering to apply the configuration for their first jet airliner. As Project Engineer on the D.H.108, with a team of 8–10 draughtsmen and engineers, Frost created the DH.108 by combining the front fuselage of the de Havilland Vampire to a swept wing and short stubby vertical tail to make the first British swept wing jet, soon to be unofficially known as the "Swallow." The experimental D.H.108 was also to serve as a test "mule" to investigate stability and control problems for the new Comet airliner.

The D.H.108 first flew on 15 May 1946, eight months after Frost had received a go-ahead on the project. Company test pilot and son of the builder, Geoffrey de Havilland Jr., who had flown on one of the aircraft had decided to attempt to break the speed record for a jet airliner at the time with said fuselage. On 12 April 1948, a D.H.108 did set a world's speed record at 973.65 km/h (605 mph) and later on became the first jet aircraft to exceed the speed of sound. The first D.H.108, TG-283, was alleged to have suddenly jumped from Mach .98 to Mach 1.05 while being test-flown by John Derry on 9 September 1948. On 27 September 1946, while practising for an upcoming run at a new speed record, Geoffrey de Havilland Jr. died when his D.H.108 broke up in the air at or near the speed of sound.

== Avro Canada ==
Frost was persuaded to move to Canada in 1947, shortly after the completion of the design of the Swallow, where he joined A.V. Roe Canada (Avro Canada). To him, this was an ideal opportunity – there was a promising project to work on and a chance to get away from the depressing conditions of postwar Britain. At the time, his wife, Joan, was living in the north of England while Frost worked at Hatfield, near London. Accommodations for many young couples were similarly strained. During his tenure at de Havilland, Frost began to put forward a number of unique ideas for a tip jet-driven rotor helicopter – a concept also known as a gyrodyne. He continued his research privately and with a group of friends, including fellow engineer, T. Desmond Earl, built a scale model to test his theories. Shortly after his departure to Canada, Earl joined Frost in his new venture, and remained his "right-hand man" for the rest of the Canadian period.

=== XC-100 / CF-100 jet fighter ===
On 14 June 1947, Frost arrived at Avro Canada's Malton, Ontario facility with his wife to take over as Project Designer of the new XC-100 jet fighter interceptor. After 18 months of development, the fighter had entered the mock-up stage. Frost decided to alter the aircraft design which immediately brought him into conflict with Avro Canada Chief Aerodynamacist Jim Chamberlin. Basically "cleaning up" the fuselage, Frost set out to change the design subtly. Even though he wanted to use a swept-wing configuration, the prototype (by now called the CF-100 Canuck) proceeded to prototype stage in the same basic configuration of straight-winged, twin-engined form. (The swept-wing CF-103 proposed by Frost in December 1950 was a transonic follow-up to the CF-100). Although the CF-100 prototype was now a much more sleek shape, Frost still considered the design awkward. "It was a clumsy thing. All brute force," he remarked.

While Frost was in England to confer with members of the Hawker Siddeley Group, Chamberlin made another alteration by moving the engines back and "notching" the wing spar to accommodate the change. The weakened spar was a flexible structure where the stress was heavy leading to potentially dangerous situations with the CF-100.

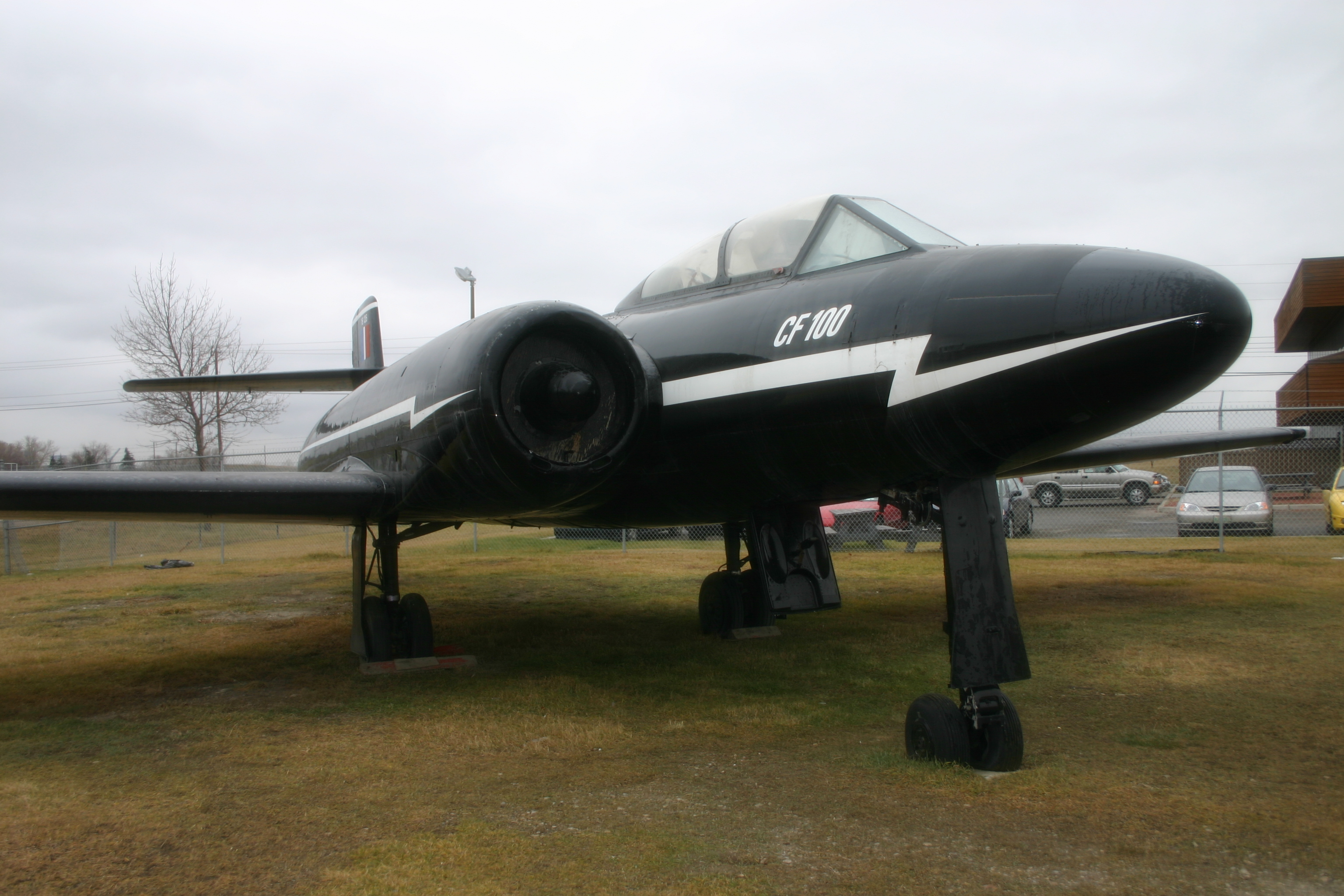
A CF-100 Mk.3 painted as the CF-100 prototype, on display at the Calgary AeroSpace Museum.

Gloster's Chief Test pilot Bill Waterton flew with Frost in the second seat; to the test pilot, this was a revelation: "(Frost was)...very much the keen English public schoolboy type. Here was another delightful contrast to England, where I was never able to find a designer with spare time enough to fly in his own creation." Frost considered it important to get a feel for the aircraft and its systems. He even tested the CF-100's ejection seat by becoming a test subject himself. Early flights revealed the great potential of the aircraft but also showed the flaw in the spar was dangerous. With the crash of the second CF-100 prototype and early production CF-100s delivered to the RCAF without the final modifications to the spar, Frost was blamed for the delays and removed as CF-100 Project Designer in early 1952.

=== Special Projects Group ===
Frost made a proposal that Avro start an experimental project based on vertical takeoff and landing concepts. "It was not a case of Frost indulging in a personal whim. The idea of a saucer-like flying machine had revolutionary implications then and still does. A conventional aircraft is very inefficient, aerodynamically. Like a bumble bee, there's no way it should fly. It only does so because of the wing which gives it lift and the engine's power to overcome the drag of the fuselage, the load, the tailplane, the stabilizers, fins and the engines."

Shortly after its formation in 1952, Frost's Special Projects Group started a paper study on a "pancake" engine, a jet turbine that had its main components arranged in a circular design. From the outset, the Special Projects Group was distinguished by an air of secrecy. Housed in a Second World War-era structure across from the company headquarters, the project moved forward under heightened security, including security guards, locked doors, and special pass cards. Here Frost (ostensibly the boss) was surrounded with like-minded thinkers and engineers. He encouraged close cooperation and a collegial atmosphere.

==== Project Y ====
Project Y mock-up c.1954.

Research undertaken by Frost on the "Coandă effect" confirmed that the concept of ground cushion could be the basis for a vehicle he had envisioned that could have both vertical take-off and landing (VTOL) capabilities and could still operate as a high-performance aircraft. As Frost developed further studies, his ideas on revolutionary vertical takeoff systems led to the patent of "Aircraft Propulsion and Control".

In 1952, "Project Y", a "spade-shaped" fighter powered by Frost's revolutionary pancake engine proceeded to mock-up stage. By 1953, with the company having little more than a wooden mock-up, paper drawings and promises to show for a $4-million (Cdn) outlay, a more critical eye was cast on the project. Not surprisingly, the plug got pulled when government funding from the Defence Research Board dried up.

==== The American connection: Project Y-2 / Weapons Systems 606A / VZ-9-AV Avrocar ====
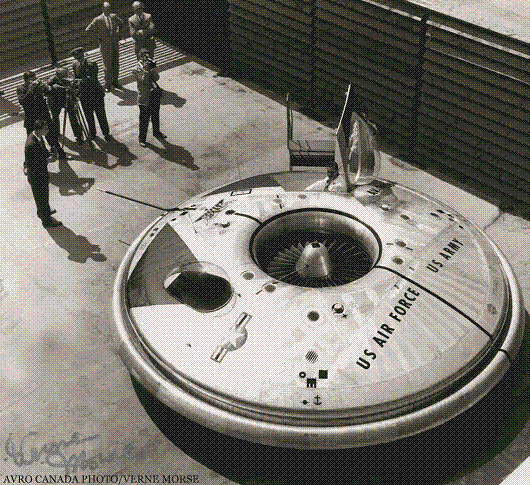
The Avro VZ-9-AV Avrocar.

Frost's later ideas revolved around a disk or saucer shape – a "flying saucer" and resulted in a number of patents in Great Britain, the United States and Canada on the unique concepts of propulsion, control and stabilisation systems that were incorporated. Frost continued to lobby for the project now called the "Y-2" and achieved a remarkable breakthrough by demonstrating the project to the United States Air Force. With funding from the Americans, Frost was able to proceed with his research. From 1955 to 1959, the design team concentrated on the new VTOL supersonic studies known as Weapon Systems 606A which Avro Canada continued to support through an associated private venture program, the PV-704 which resulted in the construction of an engine test rig in 1957.

The PV-704 supersonic test model, powered by six Armstrong-Siddeley Viper jet engines driving a central rotor, was built and housed inside a small, brick testing rig. The test model was abandoned in favour of a simpler flying model led to the only design that materialised from the Avro Special Project Group, a "proof-of-concept" vehicle, the VZ-9-AV "Avrocar". Two Avrocar prototypes were constructed and completed a series of wind tunnel tests at NASA Ames in California and a 75-hour flying program at the Malton home of Avro Canada. The results of the testing revealed a stability problem and degraded performance due to turbo-rotor tolerances. Before modifications could be achieved, funding ran out with the final flight test program completed in March 1961.

As the result of his work in vertical takeoff systems, John Frost was invited to become a fellow of the Canadian Aeronautics and Space Institute after he presented the W. Rupert Turnbull seventh lecture on 25 May 1961. The citation noted that Frost had discovered and patented the air cushion effect that had been evident in his work on flying saucers and that U.S. Patent #3124323 "Aircraft Propulsion and Control" was one of a series of US, Canadian and British patents to become known as the "Frost patents."

== New Zealand ==
With the end of the Avrocar project, he left A. V. Roe Canada early in 1962. In the wake of the cancellation of its premier fighter program, the CF-105 Avro Arrow by the Canadian government, Avro Canada was unable to survive, being broken up on 30 April 1962. Like many of the former employees of A.V. Roe Canada, John Frost began a new career when he left the company. He left Canada for New Zealand in 1964 where he again became part of the aviation industry; first joining the airworthiness section of the Civil Aviation Authority where he headed the certification of the Waitomo PL-11 Airtruck, the first commercial aircraft developed in New Zealand. During this period, Frost also designed the Murray Air, an agricultural biplane.

Later in 1965, Frost became a technical services engineer for Air New Zealand, serving in that position for 13 years until his retirement in April 1978. His time at Air New Zealand was very fulfilling. He was responsible for all technical activities at the airline's engineering headquarters at Māngere, New Zealand. All "Air New Zealand aircraft are showcases for the Frost ingenuity." (Daily News New Zealand, April 1978). The unique swivelling bassinets attached to the airliner's hat racks are his design along with locks that hold down pallets in the cargo hold, air-conditioning systems for the cargo bay, rest seats for air crew, toilet tap washers and gallery plugs. His most impressive design was a gigantic hydraulically operated tail dock system.

After retirement, he continued to explore many areas. He became involved in an aviation project – designing and constructing, with the assistance of university students at Auckland, a human-powered aircraft. He would not see his EMME 1 fly.

== Death ==
Frost died from a heart attack in Auckland, New Zealand on 9 October 1979 at the age of 63.

== Legacy ==
His last creation did fly, albeit towed behind a car, and the EMME 1 is now under restoration for display at the Museum of Transport & Technology, Auckland.

== See also ==
- Alexander Lippisch
