= Avro Canada CF-103 =

Cancelled military aircraft

CF-103
- CF-103 mock-up at the Avro company

General information
- Type: Interceptor
- Manufacturer: Avro Aircraft Limited (Canada)
- Status: Cancelled December 1951
- Primary user: Royal Canadian Air Force (intended)
- Number built: 0

History
- Developed from: Avro Canada CF-100

The Avro Canada CF-103 was a proposed Canadian interceptor, designed by Avro Canada in the early 1950s as a development, and possible replacement of the company's CF-100 Canuck, that was entering service at the time with the Royal Canadian Air Force (RCAF). Although intended to be capable of flying at transonic speeds, the CF-103 only offered a moderate increase in performance and capability over the CF-100; subsequently, the aircraft never progressed beyond the mock-up stage.

== Design and development ==
Even before the prototype of the CF-100 had flown, Avro Canada was conducting studies of potential advanced variations of the aircraft, as the RCAF was seeking an interceptor with greater high-speed performance. Due to the perceived limitations of the CF-100's original "thick", straight wing, Chief Designer John Frost proposed a series of refinements that included a thinner swept wing. In December 1950, the Avro Aircraft Design Office decided to proceed with a redesign, primarily incorporating the early series CF-100 fuselage structure with a new swept wing and tail surfaces as part of the C-100S design study. (Note: After being brought into the XC-100 project at a late stage, Frost considerably "cleaned up" the original design but realized the "rudimentary" wing/engine planform limited the design to subsonic performance levels. Consequently, he began a further redesign based on his independent study of more advanced swept-wing designs.)

Frost considered the new design as an interim aircraft between the CF-100 and the more advanced C-104 project. The salient changes to the basic wing planform were in decreasing its chord and thickness, and adding a 42° sweep to the leading edge, creating a near-delta wing configuration. The tail surfaces were also swept back. One version that was considered featured two streamlined fuel tanks blended into the leading edge of the wings near the three/quarter position. (Note: Scale models of the proposed CF-103 indicated a more streamlined wing/engine section that incorporated a thick wing root blending the engines into the top of the fuselage. Pinion (outboard wing) fuel tanks and a mildly swept tail were also featured.)

Despite the use of more powerful engines, the redesign had very modest performance specifications, with a planned maximum diving speed of Mach 0.95, scarcely better than the placarded Mach 0.85 speed limit of the production CF-100 Mk 2 and Mk 3. Avro executives, recognizing that the company had already suffered due to the protracted development of the CF-100, determined that Frost's revised design would provide a "hedge" against the CF-100's failure to secure long-term contracts.

In 1951, the Canadian Department of Trade and Commerce issued an order for two prototypes and a static test airframe, under the CF-103 project designation. Jigs, tools and detailed engineering drawings were in place by June 1951, with wind tunnel testing, conducted at Cornell University, completed by November 1951. Although a wooden mock-up of the CF-103 was built, along with a separate cockpit area and engine section that was partially framed in, the mock-up did not feature an undercarriage unit nor any interior fittings. Two different tail designs were fitted with the initial effort only having a swept leading edge of the tail, while the definitive version had a much more raked appearance. The engineering and installation requirements for the CF-103's proposed Orenda 17 jet engines were not finalized, as the experimental "hybrid" using an Orenda 8 compressor unit and Orenda 11 two-stage turbine, matched to a "reheat" unit, had not been fully developed. (Note: Although an Orenda TR7 was first contemplated, the more powerful Orenda 17 encountered recurrent problems in test flying with surging and asymmetrical thrust that were never resolved.)

== Cancellation ==
During 1951, flight tests carried out by Chief Development Test Pilot S/L Janusz Żurakowski and other members of the Flight Test unit, revealed the development potential of the CF-100 had outstripped the intended performance envelope of the CF-103, while Frost and the Design Office became preoccupied with more sophisticated designs as potential replacements for the CF-100. (Note: Although part of the "chain" from the CF-100S/CF-100D leading to the supersonic C-104 Advanced Fighter study, the CF-103 was obsolescent and proved to be a "dead end." The C-104 as the C-104/2 was destined to morph into the later Avro CF-105 Arrow.) Work on the CF-103 stalled, with the maiden flight originally scheduled for the summer of 1952, postponed to mid-1953. With Cold War pressures mounting, the Canadian government demanded that production of the latest CF-100 fighter, as well as developing more advanced variants of the Canuck should predominate, leading the Avro company to curtail the moribund CF-103 project in December 1951. (Note: Canada had made a military commitment to enter the Korean War with the Department of National Defence mobilizing to provide a credible RCAF presence, including fielding a front line fighter squadron; ultimately, only an Air Transport Command unit was deployed. With Avro struggling with the CF-100's wing spar problems that had led to the RCAF rejecting the first series of pre-production aircraft, the Canadian government was justifiably concerned that the company was diverting its energies. Along with the cancellation of the CF-103, Avro's other high-profile project, the Avro Canada C102 Jetliner was similarly affected, with production of the airliner being halted.)

Although the mock-up languished in the experimental bay at the factory, a dramatic event served to preclude any attempt to restart the project. On 18 December 1952, from a height of 33,000 ft (10,000 m), Żurakowski dived the CF-100 Mk 4 prototype (RCAF Serial No. 18112) to Mach 1.06. His "unauthorized" test flight (Note: Żurakowski had permission to explore the maximum speed of the aircraft, although along with his direct superiors in the Flight Test office, all were unaware that the Special Projects Group of the Design Office had been concurrently promoting the CF-103 project to the RCAF.) resulted in the final scrapping of the mock-up.

== Specifications ==
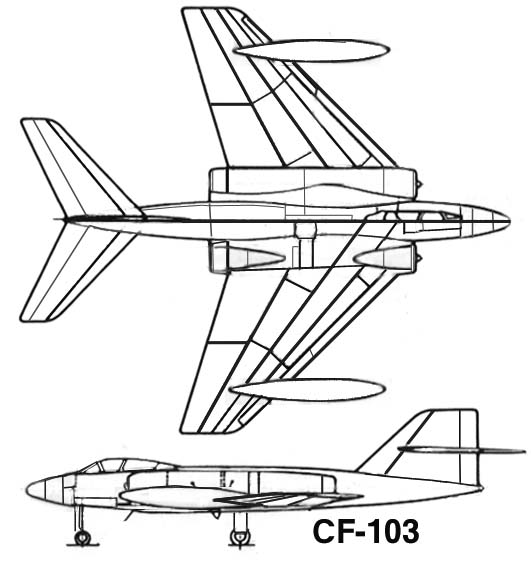
CF-103: original concept, c. 1950

Data from Avro Arrow: The Story of the Avro Arrow from its Evolution to its Extinction

General characteristics

- Crew: 2
- Length: 59 ft 9 in (18.21 m)
- Wingspan: 43 ft (13 m)
- Height: 16 ft (4.9 m)
- Powerplant: 2 × Avro Canada Orenda 17 afterburning turbojet engines, 7,275 lbf (32.36 kN) thrust each dry, 8,490 lbf (37.8 kN) with afterburner

Performance

- Maximum speed: 647 mph (1,041 km/h, 562 kn)
- Maximum speed: Mach 0.85
- Never exceed speed: M0.95

Armament
Proposed

- Forward-firing ventral gun pack containing eight .5-inch Browning M3 machine guns (200 rounds per machine gun)

== See also ==
- CF-105 Arrow

Related development

- CF-100 Canuck

Aircraft of comparable role, configuration, and era

- Gloster Javelin
- Mikoyan-Gurevich MiG-19PF
- Sud-Ouest Vautour
- Yakovlev Yak-25
- Yakovlev Yak-28P/PM
- Hawker Hunter

Related lists

- List of aircraft of the Canadian Air Force
