= Rolls-Royce RB.106 =

1950s British turbojet aircraft engine project

RB.106
- Type: Turbojet
- Manufacturer: Rolls-Royce Limited
- First run: 1953

The Rolls-Royce RB.106 was an advanced military turbojet engine design of the 1950s by Rolls-Royce Limited. The work was sponsored by the Ministry of Supply. The RB.106 project was cancelled in March 1957, at a reported total cost of £100,000.

== Design and development ==
The RB.106 was a two-shaft design with two axial flow compressors each driven by its own single stage turbine and reheat. It was of similar size to the Rolls-Royce Avon, allowing it to be used as a drop-in replacement, but it would have produced about twice the thrust (with reheat) at 21,750 lbf (96.7 kN). The two-shaft layout was relatively advanced for the era; the single-shaft de Havilland Gyron matched it in power terms, while the two-spool Bristol Olympus was much less powerful at its then-current state of development.

Apart from being expected to power British aircraft such as those competing for Operational Requirement F.155, it was selected to be the powerplant for the Avro Canada CF-105 Arrow. The American company Westinghouse was reported in 1956 to be serious about acquiring a licence to build the RB.106. A scaled-up version of the RB.106 intended for F.155 was the Rolls-Royce RB.122. The competing Bristol two-spool engine to the same specification was to have been the Bristol Zeus.

However funding was cut with the 1957 Defence White Paper which terminated most aircraft development then under way. The Arrow moved to an indigenous two-spool design similar to the RB.106, the Orenda Iroquois.

== Applications (proposed) ==
- Avro Canada CF-105 Arrow
- Supermarine Type 553

== Specifications (RB.106) ==
==== General characteristics ====
- Type: Two-shaft turbojet
- Length:
- Diameter:
- Dry weight:

==== Components ====
- Compressor: axial flow; LP followed by HP
- Turbine: axial flow; HP single stage; LP single-stage

==== Performance ====
- Maximum thrust: 21,750 lbf (96.7 kN)

== See also ==
Related lists

- List of aircraft engines
