= Orenda Iroquois =

1950s Canadian turbojet aircraft engine

PS.13 Iroquois
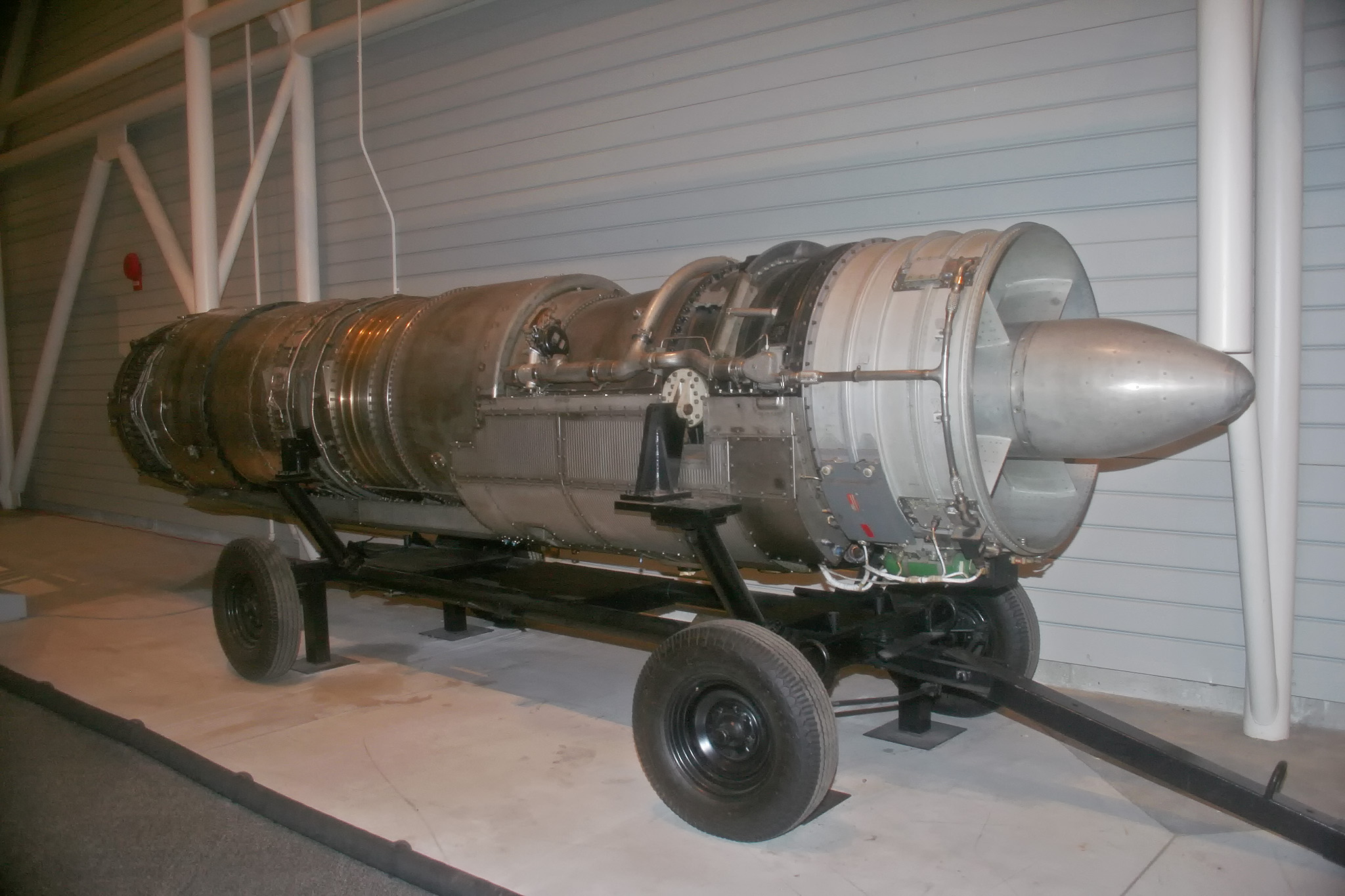
- Orenda Iroquois at the Canada Aviation Museum in Ottawa.
- Type: Turbojet
- National origin: Canada
- Manufacturer: Orenda Engines
- First run: 15 December 1954
- Major applications: Avro Canada CF-105 Arrow
- Developed from: Avro Canada Chinook

The Orenda PS.13 Iroquois is an advanced turbojet engine that was designed for military use. It was developed by the Canadian aircraft engine manufacturer Orenda Engines, a part of the Avro Canada group. Intended for the CF-105 Arrow interceptor, development was cancelled, along with the Arrow, in 1959.

== Design history ==
For the CF-105 Arrow project, Avro Canada had originally intended to use one of three different engines, all UK designs: Rolls-Royce RB.106, the Bristol B.0L.4 Olympus, or a license-built version of the Olympus, the Curtiss-Wright J67. The RB.106 and J67 were selected as the primary and backup engines for the new design. However, both the RB.106 and J67 were cancelled during the Arrow's design phase, too far into the program to select the Olympus. Orenda Engines quickly responded with the PS.13 Iroquois design.

In overall design terms, the PS.13 was similar to the RB.106, using a "two-spool" layout with low-pressure and high-pressure sections of the compressor for added efficiency. It differed slightly in being somewhat more powerful, especially in afterburner. The design also incorporated a number of new design features intended to improve simplicity and lightness. With this in mind, Orenda pioneered work in the use of titanium in engines, with 20% by weight of the Iroquois (mainly the compressor rotor blades) consisting of this metal. Titanium has light weight, high strength and good temperature and corrosion resistance. It was estimated that the engine would be 850 pounds (386 kg) lighter than if steel had been used. During the early 1950s, this material was in short supply, and the lack of knowledge of its physical properties and fabrication techniques created problems which had to be overcome. It was also very expensive relative to the more common materials such as steel and aluminum.

It was recognized that if the engine parts could be designed with titanium, then the supporting structure could also be lightened due to reduced forces within the engine, with an overall saving in weight. Other parts, such as gearbox casings were made with a magnesium alloy. Inconel was used to make the blades in the low pressure turbine assembly and the metal insulation blanket found at the rear of the engine. This heat resistant nickel-chrome alloy retains its strength at high temperatures and resists oxidation and corrosion. The primary reason for using these advanced metals was to save weight and improve performance, creating an engine with a 5:1 thrust to weight ratio that could produce a sea level dry thrust of 19,250 lb (26,000 lb with afterburner).

== Testing ==
Wind tunnel tests demonstrated the engine's successful operation under sustained high inlet temperatures, and the ability to make normal relights up to 60,000 feet (18,000 m), the limit of the wind tunnel in which the tests were conducted. By 1958, the Iroquois had completed more than 5,000 hours of ground running, and many thousands of hours had also been spent testing the engines' principal components, at the Orenda testing facilities at Nobel, near Parry Sound, Ontario.

In 1956, an American Boeing B-47 Stratojet was loaned to the RCAF to flight test the Iroquois for use in the CF-105. Canadair, the sub-contractor, attached an Iroquois to the right side of the bomber's rear fuselage, near the tail, simply because there was no other place to mount it. Designated CL-52 by Canadair, it was a nightmare to fly, since the thrust was asymmetrical; this created great problems for flight control. Much of the flying was done by Thomas Cooper-Slipper, a veteran test pilot. After the Arrow project was cancelled, the B-47B/CL-52, which had logged about 35 hours of engine flight tests, was returned to the U.S and subsequently scrapped. The CL-52 was the only B-47 used by any foreign service.

The program was cancelled, along with the Arrow, on 20 February 1959.

== Surviving examples ==
The Canada Aviation and Space Museum in Ottawa houses the nose and cockpit section of Arrow RL 206, along with various wing and fuselage components, and a complete Iroquois-2 engine, Serial Number 117. An example of an Iroquois-1 engine is found at the Canadian Warplane Heritage Museum in Mount Hope, near Hamilton, Ontario. Another Iroquois-2 engine Serial Number 116 is owned by a private collector in Fort St. John, British Columbia.

== Specifications (Iroquois 2) ==
Data from Flight.

==== General characteristics ====
- Type: Twin-spool turbojet
- Length: 231 in (590 cm)
- Diameter: 42 in (110 cm)
- Dry weight: 4,650 lb (2,110 kg)

==== Components ====
- Compressor: 10-stage split axial flow compressor
- Combustors: Annular combustion chamber
- Turbine: Single-stage HP, two-stage LP, axial flow

==== Performance ====
- Maximum thrust: over 20,000 lbf (89 kN), probably 22,000 lbf (98 kN), without afterburning; 30,000 lbf (130 kN), with afterburning
- Overall pressure ratio: 8:1
- Air mass flow: 420 lb/sec (190.5 kg/s)
- Specific fuel consumption: 0.85 lb/(lbf⋅h) or 24 g/(kN⋅s) at military (non-reheat), 1.965 lb/(lbf⋅h) or 55.7 g/(kN⋅s) with afterburner (reheat)
- Thrust-to-weight ratio: 6.45:1 at maximum thrust

== See also ==
Related development

- Avro Canada Chinook

Comparable engines

- Bristol Olympus
- de Havilland Gyron
- General Electric YJ93
- Pratt & Whitney J75
- Rolls-Royce RB.106

Related lists

- List of aircraft engines
