= Supermarine Type 553 =

British supersonic fighter aircraft project

General information
- Type: Supersonic research aircraft
- Manufacturer: Supermarine
- Status: abandoned
- Number built: 0

The Supermarine Type 553 was a British Mach 2 research aircraft project from 1953 that never proceeded beyond the initial proposal.

== Design and development ==
The difficulty of achieving Mach 2 flight was realised during the development of the Supermarine Type 545, which led to Vickers-Supermarine proposing the 553 with a swept wing that would reduce aerodynamic drag. It was to have been built using aluminium alloy which limited the top speed, and the Air Ministry wanted a twin engine design in which alternative engines could readily be installed, and 553 development was abandoned. Lack of endurance was also cited as a problem. The Bristol 188 was developed instead.

== Specifications (Supermarine Type 553) ==
Data from Buttler, 2000, p.77 & 79

General characteristics

- Crew: One
- Length: 58.0 ft (17.7 m)
- Wingspan: 30.8 ft (9.4 m)
- Wing area: 330 sq ft (31 m^{2})
- Gross weight: 27,000 lb (12,247 kg)
- Fuel capacity: 780 imp gal (3,546 L; 937 US gal)
- Powerplant: 1 × Rolls-Royce RB.106R jet engine, 15,000 lbf (67 kN) thrust dry, 22,600 lbf (101 kN) with afterburner

Performance

- Maximum speed: 1,523 mph (2,451 km/h, 1,323 kn) or Mach 2.3, @ 36,100 feet, Mach 1.22 at sea level.
- Rate of climb: 53,000 ft/min (270 m/s) initial
- Wing loading: 81.8 lb/sq ft (399 kg/m^{2})
- Thrust/weight: 0.56 to 0.84 (w. afterburner/reheat)

Armament
None

== See also ==
Related lists

- List of experimental aircraft
