= Avro Canada Chinook =

1940s Canadian turbojet aircraft engine

TR.4 Chinook
- Type: Turbojet
- National origin: Canada
- Manufacturer: Turbo Research / Avro Canada
- First run: 17 March 1948
- Number built: 3
- Developed into: Avro Canada Orenda

The Avro Canada TR.4 Chinook was Canada's first turbojet engine, designed by Turbo Research and manufactured by A.V. Roe Canada Ltd. Named for the warm Chinook wind that blows in the Rocky Mountains, only three Chinooks were built and none were used operationally. After being scaled up from 2,600 lbf (12 kN) to 6,500 lbf (29 kN), it would become the Orenda.

== Development ==
In late 1942 the National Research Council of Canada (NRC) sent Dr. J.J. Greene and Malcolm Kuhring to England to report on the various advanced research projects and to see if Canada could play a role in Empire projects. One of the team's many topics in the resulting report was an introduction to the work on jet engines being carried out by Frank Whittle at Power Jets. The Department of Munitions and Supply (DMS) thought this was a wonderful opportunity to get in at the "ground floor" of a newly developing field, one that the country could enter with relative ease and thereby reduce their dependence on foreign suppliers for aircraft engines.

In early 1943 a new mission, including Dr. Ken Tupper and Paul Dilworth from the NRC and C.A. Banks of the DMS, left for England specifically to study the jet engine and report on ways that the Dominion could contribute to the jet effort. The resulting report, known today as the Banks Report, suggested two lines of research. One led from the realization that no one in the nascent industry really understood the effects of real-world weather on the operations of jet engines, especially in icing conditions. The report suggested forming a research centre specifically to study this problem. The report went on to suggest the formation of a private jet engine company.

Almost immediately after they returned to Canada, Dilworth started work on what became the Cold Weather Testing Station in Winnipeg. They were supplied with an original Whittle W.1, and later, a captured Junkers Jumo 004. Their research demonstrated that water ingestion reduced power by about 20%, not entirely unexpected, but at the same time doubled fuel use, which was a surprise. Further work on the problem led to a number of design elements that would be used on future Canadian jet designs.

While the CWTS was being set up, the Dominion government also worked on the second part of the Banks Report, and on 1 July 1944 formally incorporated Turbo Research in Leaside, Toronto. Dilworth returned from CWTS to lead a series of design studies based on the Whittle-style centrifugal compressor design, known as TR.1, TR.2 and TR.3. However, these designs were abandoned in favor of a new axial compressor-based design, the TR.4, likely due to their exposure to the Jumo 004. Over the next year the team was built out as more engineers joined the effort, including Winnett Boyd, Joe Purvis, Burt Avery and Harry Keast from Power Jets. Detailed design was completed in early 1947, and the engine first ran on 17 March 1948.

At the time the Chinook was being designed, Avro had little production capacity and no engine fabrication experience. They farmed out parts manufacture to 1,200 different companies, providing everything from gears and ball bearings, to the compressor and turbine blades. Many of the techniques for fabrication had never been needed in Canada before, and led to a small industrial revolution as they were developed for the project. Among the many advances brought to Canadian industry as part of the Chinook program, Light Alloys Ltd. invested in their first aluminum casting, while Shawinigan Chemicals did the same for stainless steels.

Although the team had already turned to the design of the Chinook's successor, the Orenda, work on the engines continued in order to gain experience in construction and operation. Frank Whittle personally viewed the engine in 1948. Only six sets of engine parts were made, from these three complete engines and one compressor section were completed. By October 1949 the engines had run over 1,000 hours and had improved to over 3,000 lbf (1,360 kg) thrust.

== Design ==
Designing on the basis of a theoretical twin-engine fighter aircraft, seemingly similar to the Messerschmitt Me 262, the TR.4 design was in many ways an analog of the Jumo 004. The primary difference in design was the use of six separate flame cans instead of the singular annular combustor of the Jumo. Compared to the Jumo, the Chinook was smaller and lighter; it was about the same diameter, but 20 inches shorter and over 300 lb (140 kg) lighter. In spite of this it produced almost double the thrust, largely due to the improved materials, especially in the turbine, which allowed for higher operating temperatures and raised the overall pressure ratio from the Jumo's 3.1 to the Chinook's 4.5.

The Chinook's compressor consisted of nine axial stages. The first two were made of stainless steel to help with debris but the remaining seven stages were made of aluminum alloy. These were attached to hubs that were also primarily made of aluminum, except the ninth disk, which was steel as it would be exposed to the heat of the combustion stage. Behind the compressor were the six straight-through flame cans, exiting onto a single-stage steel turbine. The final exhaust gas temperature was 650 degrees Celsius. Air cooling for the turbine was provided by a series of six tubes running from the middle of the compressor to the turbine, lying between the flame cans, which exited in front of the turbine face. An accessories section was powered off a shaft at the front of the engine at the main bearing. The front main bearing was located under a prominent nose cone that extended well out in front of the engine. An oil tank was "wrapped" around the engine at about the 4 o'clock position, as viewed from the front.

== Specifications (TR.4-11) ==
Data from Aircraft engines of the World 1950

==== General characteristics ====
- Type: Turbojet
- Length: 125.1 in (3,178 mm)
- Diameter: 32 in (813 mm)
- Dry weight: 1,250 lb (567 kg)

==== Components ====
- Compressor: 9-stage Axial flow
- Combustors: 6 interconnected can combustion chambers
- Turbine: 1-stage axial flow turbine
- Fuel type: Kerosene
- Oil system: Dry sump pressure spray with scavenge at 15 psi (1 bar)

==== Performance ====
- Maximum thrust: 2,600 lbf (11,565.38 N) for take-off at 10,100 rpm

2,100 lbf (9,341.27 N) normal at 9,800 rpm
1,900 lbf (8,451.62 N) cruise at 9,500 rpm

- Overall pressure ratio: 4.5:1
- Air mass flow: 42 lb/s (19 kg/s) at 10100 rpm
- Turbine inlet temperature: 1,292 °F (700 °C; 973 K) TIT

1,202 °F (650 °C; 923 K) TET

- Specific fuel consumption: 1 lb/lbf/h (0.028 kg/N/ks)
- Power-to-weight ratio: 2.083 lbf/lb (20.43 N/kg)
