= Avro Canada CF-100 Canuck =

Interceptor aircraft in service 1952-1981

CF-100 Canuck
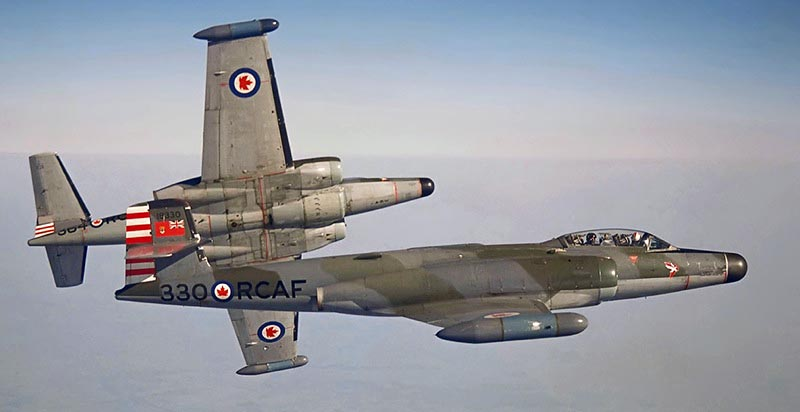
- No. 423 Squadron Mk 4B CF-100s, 1962. This squadron was based in Grostenquin, France.

General information
- Type: Interceptor aircraft
- Manufacturer: Avro Canada
- Primary users: Royal Canadian Air Force Belgian Air Force
- Number built: 692

History
- Introduction date: 1952
- First flight: 19 January 1950
- Retired: 1981
- Developed into: Avro Canada CF-103

The Avro Canada CF-100 Canuck (affectionately known as the "Clunk") is a Canadian twinjet fighter-interceptor designed and produced by aircraft manufacturer Avro Canada. It was the only Canadian-designed fighter to have entered mass production.

Work commenced in October 1946 in response to a Royal Canadian Air Force (RCAF) specification calling for a new jet-powered interceptor/fighter aircraft suitable for long-distance patrol missions and all-weather operations. On 19 January 1950, the CF-100 Mark 1 prototype, 18101, had its maiden flight, powered by a pair of Rolls-Royce Avon RA 3 turbojet engines. Pre-production and production series aircraft were powered by the domestically-developed Avro Orenda engine instead. Flight testing proved the CF-100 to possess a relatively short takeoff run and a high climb rate, making it well suited to its role as an interceptor. On 18 December 1952, Squadron Leader Janusz Żurakowski, the Avro company chief development test pilot, took the CF-100 Mk 4 prototype up to Mach 1.10 in a dive from 14,000 m (45,000 ft), making the type the first straight-winged jet aircraft to achieve controlled supersonic flight.

The CF-100 principally served with the Royal Canadian Air Force and Canadian Armed Forces; it was also procured in small numbers by Belgium to equip the Belgian Air Force. Introduced in 1952 during the Cold War, the CF-100 was typically deployed at NATO bases in Europe, and in North America as part of North American Aerospace Defense Command (NORAD). In addition to use by frontline squadrons, it was also supplied to operational training units and frequently used for secondary duties, including aerial reconnaissance and electronic warfare roles. In the early 1950s, the Avro Canada CF-103, an advanced derivative of the CF-100 with a swept wing and capable of transonic speeds, was cancelled during its development. Concepts explored for the CF-103 ultimately led to the CF-105 Arrow.

From 1961, RCAF CF-100s were withdrawn from the interceptor role, replaced by the McDonnell-Douglas CF-101 Voodoo; some were reallocated to support roles. In 1981, all remaining CF-100s were withdrawn from service. They were replaced in training and electronic warfare roles by the Canadair CT-133 Silver Star and the CC-117 Falcon respectively.

== Design and development ==
=== Background ===
Amid the final years of the Second World War, officials in Canada had concluded a self-sufficient indigenous military aviation industry would be of considerable national value, and that the new field of jet propulsion held considerable promise. As early as July 1944, Canada commenced work on a turbojet engine programme, producing the experimental Avro Canada Chinook powerplant. During the late 1940s and early 1950s, events such as the Korean War and Soviet atomic bomb project contributed to the rising international tensions of what would become known as the Cold War. The Canadian government responded by greatly increasing defense expenditure. The Royal Canadian Air Force (RCAF) accounted for 46.6% of overall defense expenditure during FY 1951–1952, some of which is attributable to several major procurement programmes.

The RCAF had a strong interest in acquiring its own fleet of jet-powered combat aircraft. It identified a need for a new jet-powered interceptor/fighter aircraft capable of patrolling the vast Canadian north and operating in all-weather conditions. Envisaged as a two-seat fighter crewed by a pilot and navigator, it would adopt two powerful engines along with a relatively advanced radar set and fire control system housed in its nose that would enable all-weather and night flying. These requirements were formalized by a RCAF specification that was issued during 1946. According to RCAF air marshal Wilfred Curtis, no existing aircraft satisfied the specification, nor was there any suitable aircraft already in development elsewhere. Thus, it was necessary for Canada to develop such a fighter itself.

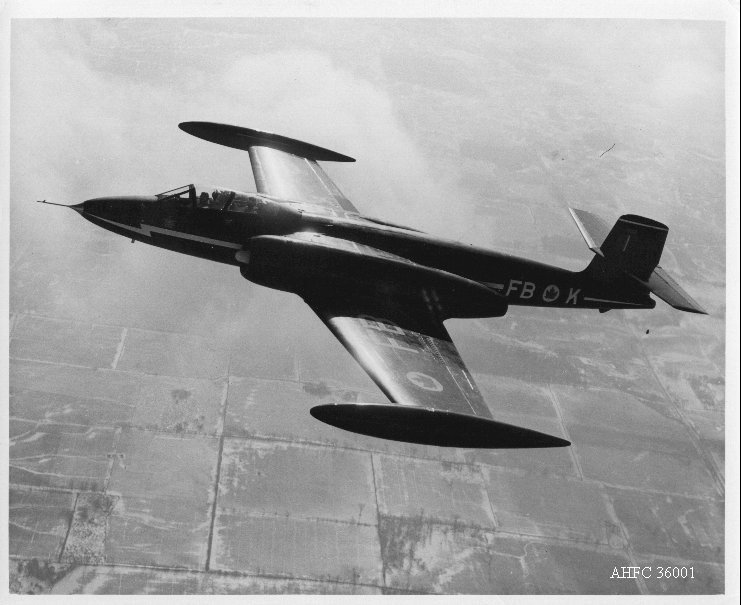
CF-100 Prototype 18102

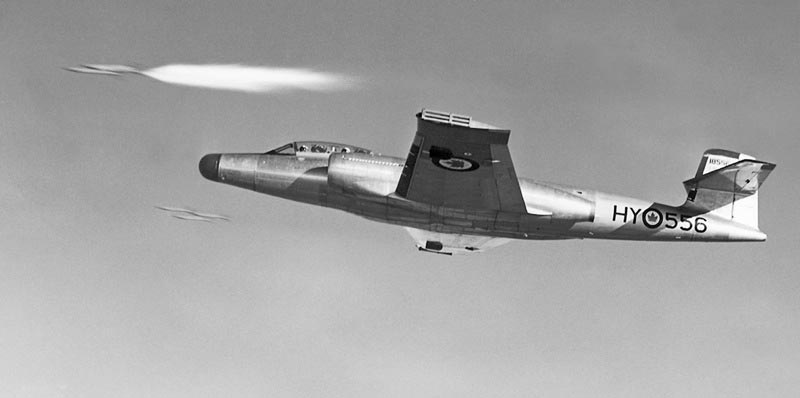
Weapons Practice Unit CF-100 Mk 5 firing rockets at first annual Air Defence Command rocket meet, Cold Lake, September 1957.

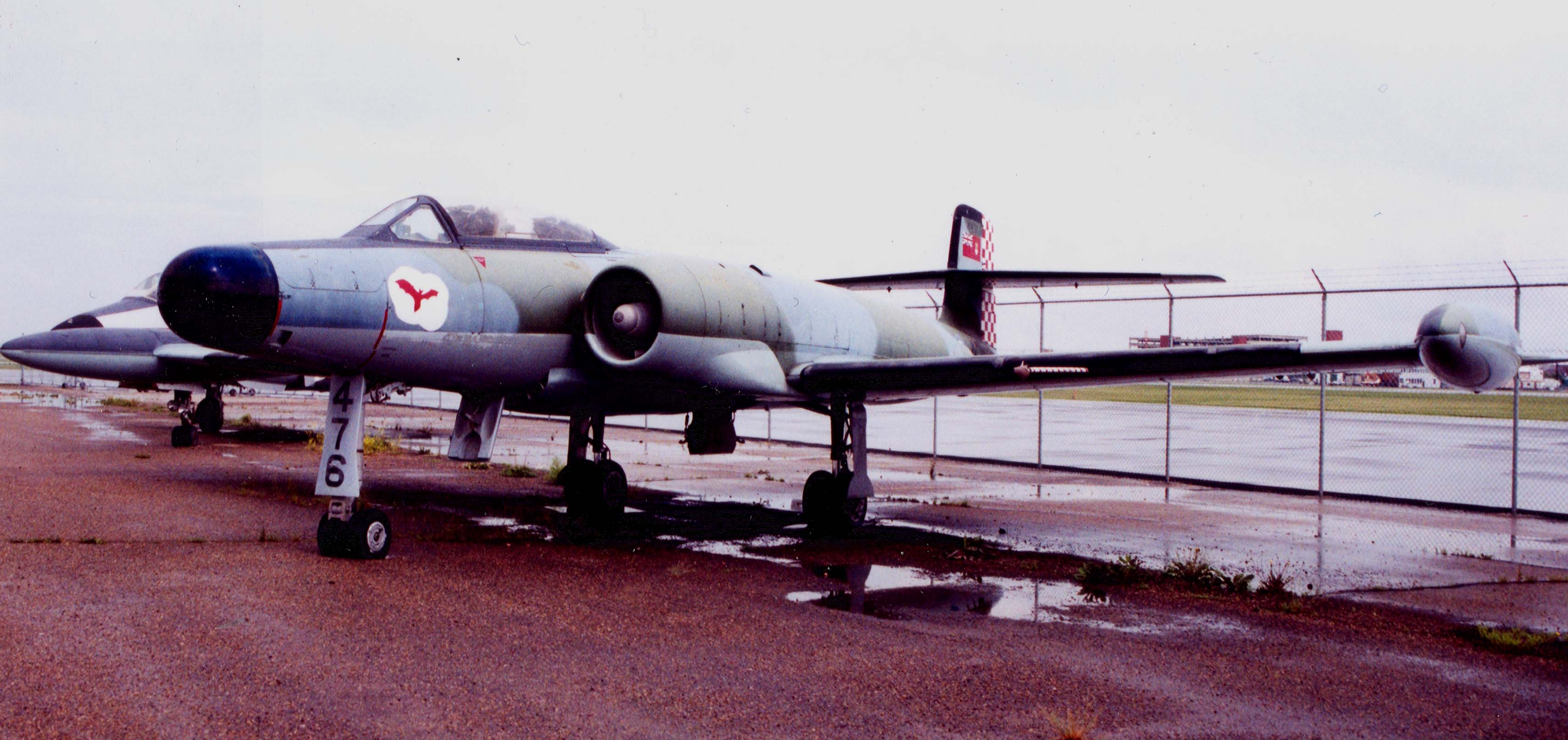
CF-100 Mk 5D (18476) former CFB Namao and No. 414 Electronic Warfare (EW) Squadron #100476 painted as No. 440 Squadron RCAF Mk 4B serving in NATO and on display at the Alberta Aviation Museum.

On 3 November 1945, an agreement was struck to develop a prototype jet-powered fighter on behalf of the RCAF; on 13 October 1946, the issuing of government contracts to aircraft manufacturer Avro Canada enabled the company to commence the associated design work. From these efforts emerged the XC-100, a prototype all-weather fighter, developed to meet the outstanding specification. Work was initially overseen by Edgar Atkin, Avro Canada's chief engineer. A key contributor to the programme was ex-de Havilland aircraft designer John Frost, who was appointed chief design engineer for military projects and thus responsible for the CF-100's development. At one stage Frost, along with Avro's chief aerodynamacist Jim Chamberlin, extensively reworked the original design of the fuselage. On 17 May 1949, in response to the programme's progress, an additional agreement was reached to produce ten pre-production fighters along with 30 Avro Orendas, an indigenously-developed turbojet engine.

=== Flight testing ===
The CF-100 Mark 1 prototype, 18101, emerged from the factory painted gloss black, with white lightning bolts running down the fuselage and engines. On 19 January 1950, the CF-100 prototype flew its maiden flight from Malton, Ontario with Gloster Aircraft Company chief test pilot squadron leader Bill Waterton (on loan from Gloster, then also part of the Hawker Siddeley group) at the controls. The Mark 1 was powered by a pair of Rolls-Royce Avon RA 3 turbojet engines, each capable of a maximum thrust of 28.9 kN (2,950 kgp / 6,500 lbf) thrust. During July 1950, the second prototype, 18102, performed its first flight. On 5 April 1951, the second prototype was lost in an accident that killed test pilot Bruce Warren. According to aviation author James Dow, this loss resulted in the programme being placed on indefinite hold and questions raised over Avro Canada's competency.

In response to the accident, Avro Canada dismissed several members of the design team and established a special working group to rectify a major structural design error. A straightforward modification that could be easily retrofitted into the pre-production aircraft was devised to solve the problem. While both prototypes had been powered by Avon engines, pre-production and production aircraft used the locally-designed Orenda powerplant instead, the first of which flew in June 1951. Delays during the Orenda's development disrupted the CF-100 programme timetable. Dissatisfied with the pace of development, Cabinet Minister C. D. Howe instructed Avro to suspend its other projects to focus entirely on completing the CF-100.

Five pre-production Mk 2 test aircraft (serial numbers 18103-18107) were produced, all fitted with Orenda 2 engines; one was fitted with dual controls and designated a Mk 2T trainer. According to pilot Jacqueline Cochran, the Orenda engine responded noticeably smoother than the British or American-built jet engines she had previously flown. Initial issues with the pre-production aircraft were soon resolved. The first production version, designated Mk 3, made its first flight during October 1952. The Mk 3 incorporated the APG-33 radar and was armed with eight .50 caliber Browning M3 machine guns. The Mk 3CT and Mk 3DT were dual control versions supplied to operational training units.

During mid-January 1955, a CF-100 arrived at Eglin AFB, Florida, for cold-weather tests in the climatic hangar. A seven-man RCAF team, headed by flight lieutenant B. D. Darling, which had previously conducted tests at Namao Air Base, Alberta, were part of the climatic detachment of Central Experimental and Proving Establishment. Testing commenced the following month. In March 1956, four CF-100 Canucks were dispatched to Eglin AFB to conduct comparative armament trials, where the type was flown by several United States Air Force (USAF) crews. The operational suitability tests, dubbed Project Banana Belt, were carried out by the 3241st Test Group (Interceptor) of the APGC's Air Force Operational Test Center, in conjunction with a project team belonging to the RCAF.

=== Production ===
During September 1950, the RCAF placed an initial production order for 124 Mk 3 aircraft, the first entering service in 1953. This model was armed with eight .50 caliber machine guns. The definitive rocket-armed Mk 4A was based on the prototype Mk 4 (a modified Mk 3), which first flew on 11 October 1952. The nose housed the much larger APG-40 radar, while the wings were equipped with wingtip pods, each containing up to 29 Mk 4/Mk 40 "Mighty Mouse" folding-fin aerial rocket, to be used in addition to the guns. During 1954, the last 54 of an order for the Mk 3 were swapped for the more advanced Mk 4, the total orders for the Mk 4 rose to 510. The Mk 4B version was furnished with more powerful Orenda 11s.

Five versions, or marks, were produced. The high-altitude Mk 5 was the final variant, production of which commenced during 1955. This model featured a 1.06 m (3 ft 6 in)-longer wingtip and enlarged tailplane, along with removal of the machine guns. The proposed Mk 6 would have been equipped with Sparrow II missiles and afterburning Orenda 11IR engines. It was intended as an "interim" fighter until development of the advanced Avro Canada CF-105 Arrow concluded, though the Arrow was also cancelled. An advanced derivative of the CF-100 was the CF-103, which was equipped with a swept wing and projected to be capable of transonic speeds; a mock-up was made in 1951, but it was considered obsolete even before the CF-100 performed a dive that exceeded the speed of sound. On 18 December 1952, squadron leader Janusz Żurakowski, the Avro company chief development test pilot, took the CF-100 Mk 4 prototype to Mach 1.0 in a dive from 9,100 m (30,000 ft), becoming the first straight-winged jet aircraft to achieve controlled supersonic flight.

== Operational history ==
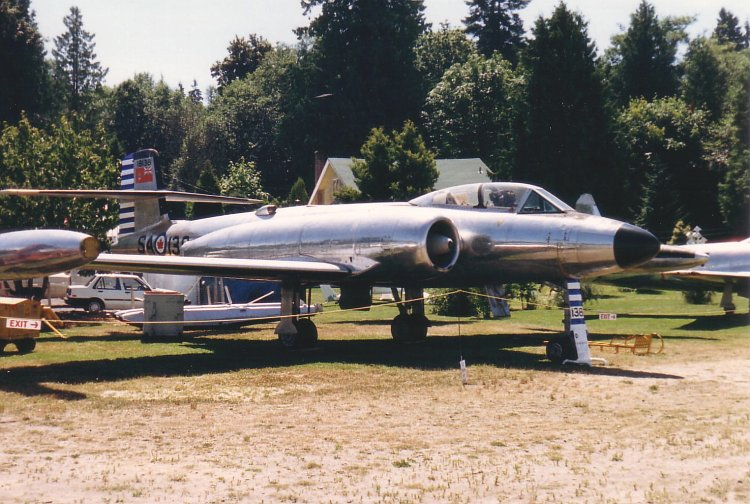
CF-100 Mk 3 at the Canadian Museum of Flight in July 1988.

Amongst RCAF pilots, the Canuck was affectionately known as the "Clunk". The nickname has been attributed to noise produced by the forward landing gear as it retracted into its well after takeoff. Another common nickname was the "Lead Sled", alluding to its heavy controls and low maneuverability; this nickname was shared by numerous 1950s aircraft. Others included CF-Zero, the Zilch, and the Beast, all references to an aircraft many pilots considered less glamorous than RCAF day fighters like the Canadair Sabre.

Many CF-100s functioned under the US–Canadian North American Air Defense Command (NORAD), which protected North American airspace from Soviet intruders, particularly by nuclear-armed bombers. Between 1956 and 1962, as part of the North Atlantic Treaty Organization (NATO), four CF-100 squadrons were based in Europe with 1 Air Division; for some time, the CF-100 was the only NATO fighter capable of operating in zero visibility and poor weather conditions.

Around the start of the Korean War in the early 1950s, the USAF found itself in urgent need of a jet-propelled, all-weather, interdiction/surveillance aircraft. This urgency was so great that the USAF was willing to consider two foreign designs: the CF-100 and the English Electric Canberra. Following an evaluation, the CF-100 was rejected due to its insufficient range and payload capabilities. The English Electric design was selected and developed into the Martin B-57 Canberra.

At its peak, the CF-100 served with nine RCAF squadrons in the mid-1950s. Four of these squadrons were deployed to Europe under the NIMBLE BAT ferry program, replacing NATO RCAF squadrons equipped with Canadair Sabre day fighters to provide all-weather defense against Soviet intruders. While flown in the North American theatre, the CF-100 would typically retain a natural metal finish; however, those flying overseas were given a British-style disruptive camouflage scheme: dark sea gray and green on top, light sea gray on the bottom.

During his Avro Canada years, the chief development pilot S/L Żurakowski continued to perform as an aerobatic display pilot, with spectacular results, especially at the 1955 Farnborough Airshow where he displayed the CF-100 in a "falling-leaf." Proclaimed the "Great Żura", many aviation and industry observers could not believe a large, all-weather fighter could be put through its paces so spectacularly. His performance has been credited with Belgium's decision to purchase the CF-100 for its air force. Efforts were made to sell the Canuck to other nations, including the United States, but no other export customers for the type would be secured. Dow reasoned that the Canuck's poor overseas sales undermined officials' confidence in exporting other aircraft, including the CF-105 Arrow.

692 CF-100s of different variants were manufactured, including the 53 purchased by Belgium. Although designed for only 2,000 flight hours, it was found the Canuck's airframe could serve for over 20,000 hours. The Belgian aircraft were either scrapped after storage or written off in crashes. Consequently, though the Canadian CF-100 would be replaced in its front line role by the faster CF-101 Voodoo, the Canuck continued to serve with 414 Squadron of the Canadian Forces, based at CFB North Bay, Ontario. During its later years, the type was tasked with aerial reconnaissance, training and electronic warfare missions. It was finally withdrawn from service during 1981. Though retired, some Canucks remain as static displays in Canada and elsewhere.

During the late 1950s, an advanced supersonic interceptor, CF-105 Arrow along with the sophisticated Orenda Iroquois engine, was under development by Avro Canada as an intended successor to the CF-100. During 1959, work on the CF-105 was terminated following a controversial decision by the Canadian government.

== Variants ==
- CF-100 Mk 1 : The first two prototypes.
  - CF-100 Mk 1P : Proposed photo-reconnaissance version. Not built.
- CF-100 Mk 2 : Ten pre-production aircraft.
  - CF-100 Mk 2T : Dual control training version of the CF-100 Mk 2. Two built.
- CF-100 Mk 3 : Two-seat all-weather long-range interceptor fighter aircraft. First production version for the RCAF. Eight .5-inch Browning M3 guns (200 rounds per gun) in a forward firing ventral gun pack. 70 built.
  - CF-100 Mk 3A : CF-100 Mk 3 sub-type, powered by two Orenda 2 turbojet engines. 21 built.
  - CF-100 Mk 3B : CF-100 Mk 3 sub-type, powered by two Orenda 8 turbojet engines. 45 built.
  - CF-100 Mk 3CT : One CF-100 Mk 3 converted into a dual control training aircraft. Later redesignated CF-100 Mk 3D.
- CF-100 Mk 4 : Two-seat all-weather long-range interceptor fighter aircraft. Eight .5-inch Browning M3 guns (200 rounds per gun) in a forward firing ventral gun pack. Plus two wingtip pods of 29 x 70-mm (2.75 in) "Mighty Mouse" fin-folding aerial rockets. One pre-production aircraft.

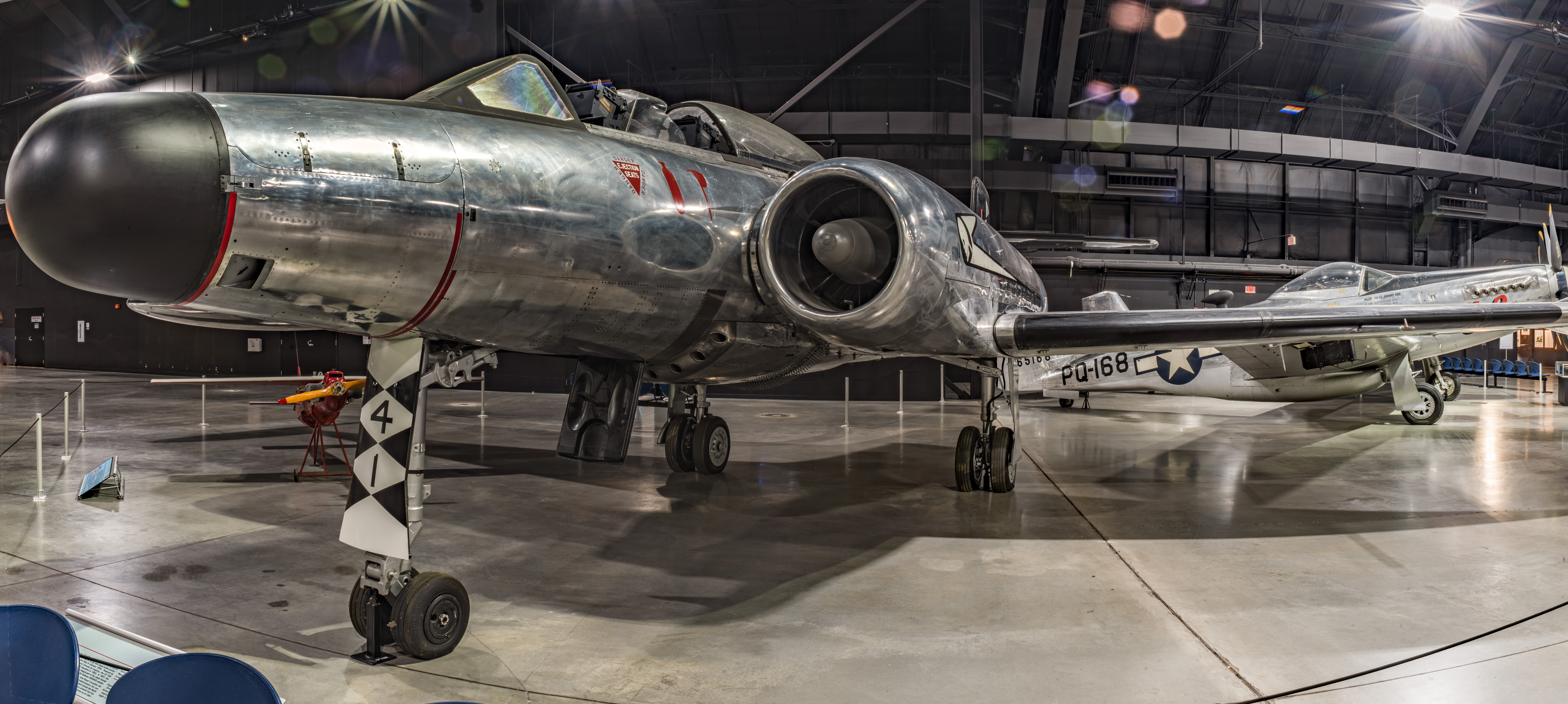
18241 – CF-100 Mk.4A on static display at the National Museum of the United States Air Force at Wright-Patterson AFB in Dayton, Ohio.

  - CF-100 Mk 4A : CF-100 Mk 4 sub-type, powered by two Orenda 9 turbojet engines. 137 built.
  - CF-100 Mk 4B : CF-100 Mk 4 sub-type, powered by two Orenda 11 turbojet engines. 141 built.
  - CF-100 Mk 4X : Proposed version of the CF-100 Mk 4. Not built.
- CF-100 Mk 5 : Two-seat all-weather long-range interceptor fighter aircraft, powered by two Orenda 11 or Orenda 14 turbojet engines. Two wingtip pods of 29 x 70-mm (2.75 in) "Mighty Mouse" fin-folding aerial rockets. 332 built.
  - CF-100 Mk 5D : Small number of CF-100 Mk 5s converted into ECM (Electronic Countermeasures), EW (Electronic Warfare) aircraft.
  - CF-100 Mk 5M : Small number of CF-100 Mk 5s equipped to carry the AIM-7 Sparrow II air-to-air missiles.
- CF-100 Mk 6 : Proposed version armed with the AIM-7 Sparrow II air-to-air missile. Not built.

== Operators ==
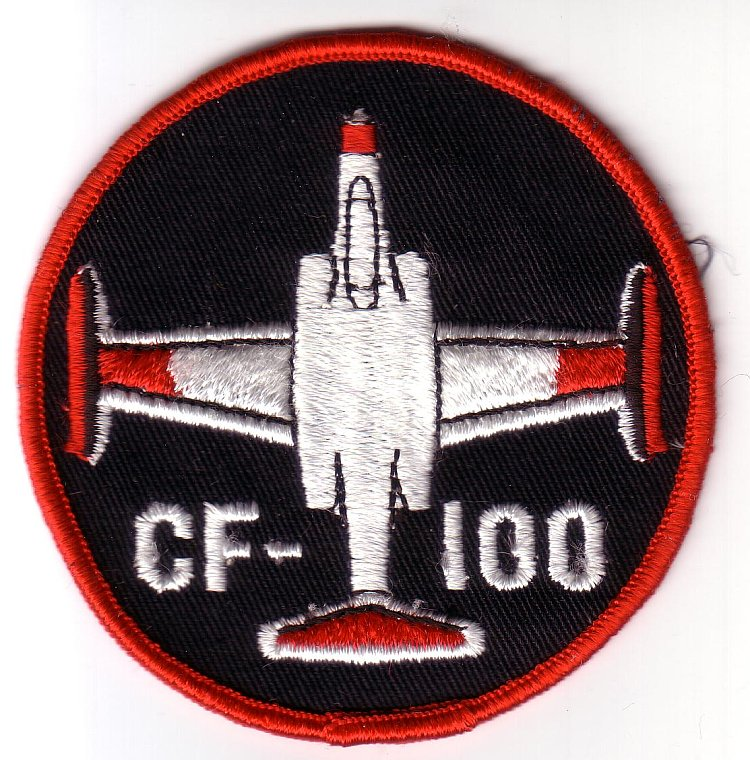
CF-100 badge worn by Canadian Forces crews in the 1970s and 80s

Belgium

- Belgian Air Force (53 Mk 5s from 1957 to 1964)
  - 11 Squadron
  - 349 Squadron
  - 350 Squadron

Canada

- Royal Canadian Air Force
- Canadian Forces Air Command
  - 409 Squadron
  - 410 Squadron
  - 414 Squadron
  - 416 Squadron
  - 419 Squadron
  - 423 Squadron
  - 425 Squadron
  - 428 Squadron
  - 432 Squadron
  - 433 Squadron
  - 440 Squadron
  - 445 Squadron
  - 448 Squadron

== Notable accidents and incidents ==
- 11 August 1953: a CF-100 crashed in Longueuil, Québec shortly after take-off, killing both crewmen. Two houses were struck, killing seven on the ground including five children - all six years old or younger.
- 15 May 1956: A CF-100 crashed into the Villa St. Louis at Orléans, Ontario, killing both crewmen and 13 civilians on the ground in what is known as the Convent Crash.
- 25 August 1958: Two 423 Squadron RCAF CF-100s in a four-aircraft formation collided before crashing at RCAF Station Grostenquin. One crashed into the base hospital, the other crashed into a field. Three of the four aircrew were killed, along with two people in the base hospital; eight others on the ground were injured.
- 7 December 1960: Two CF-100s (18571 and 18610) of 428 Squadron collided near Val D’Or, Quebec while on a nighttime intercept exercise. Four crew members were killed. The intense explosion caused by the collision was seen 100 miles away.

== Aircraft on display ==
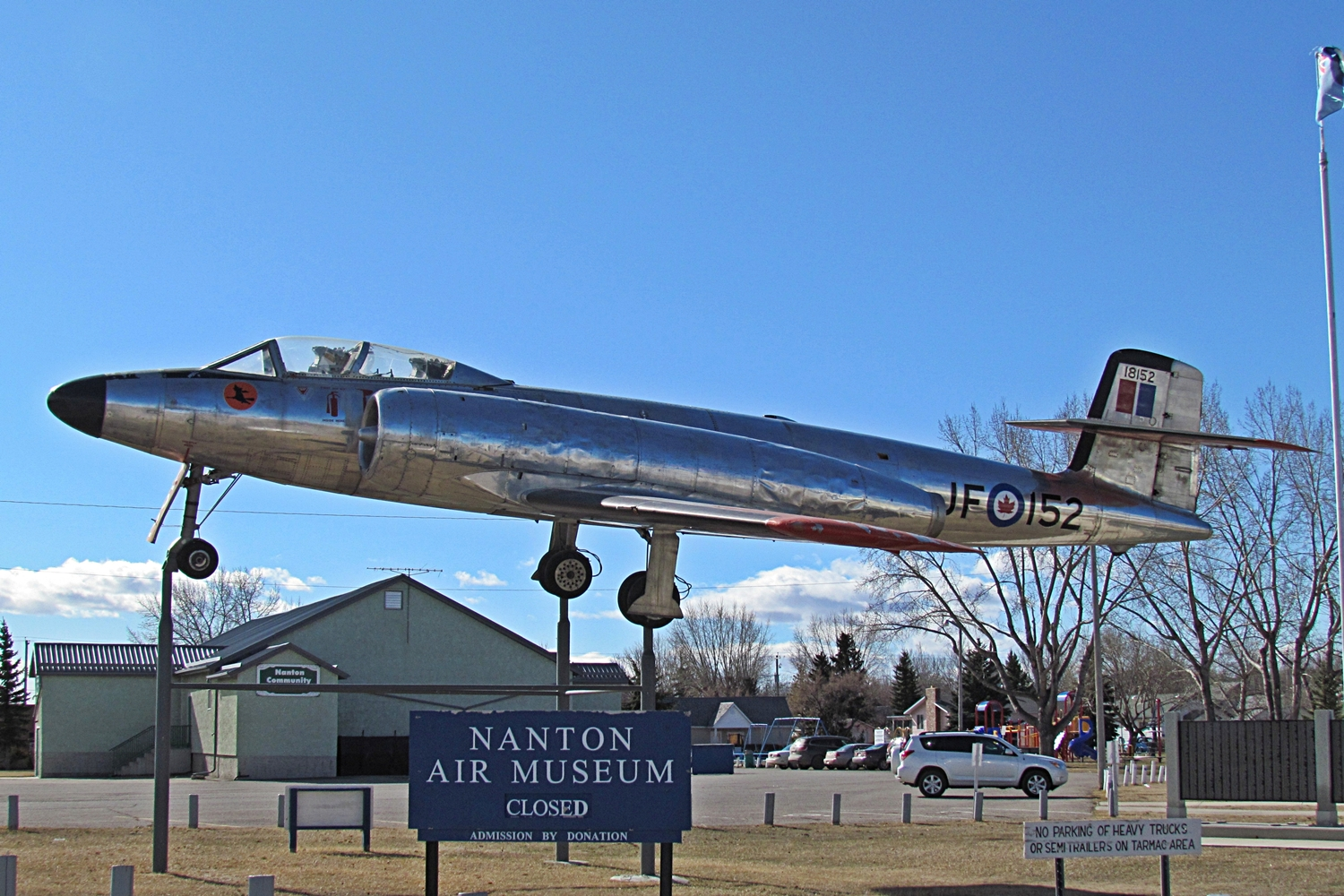
Avro Canada CF-100 Canuck Mk.3D on display at the Nanton Air Museum, Nanton, Alberta.

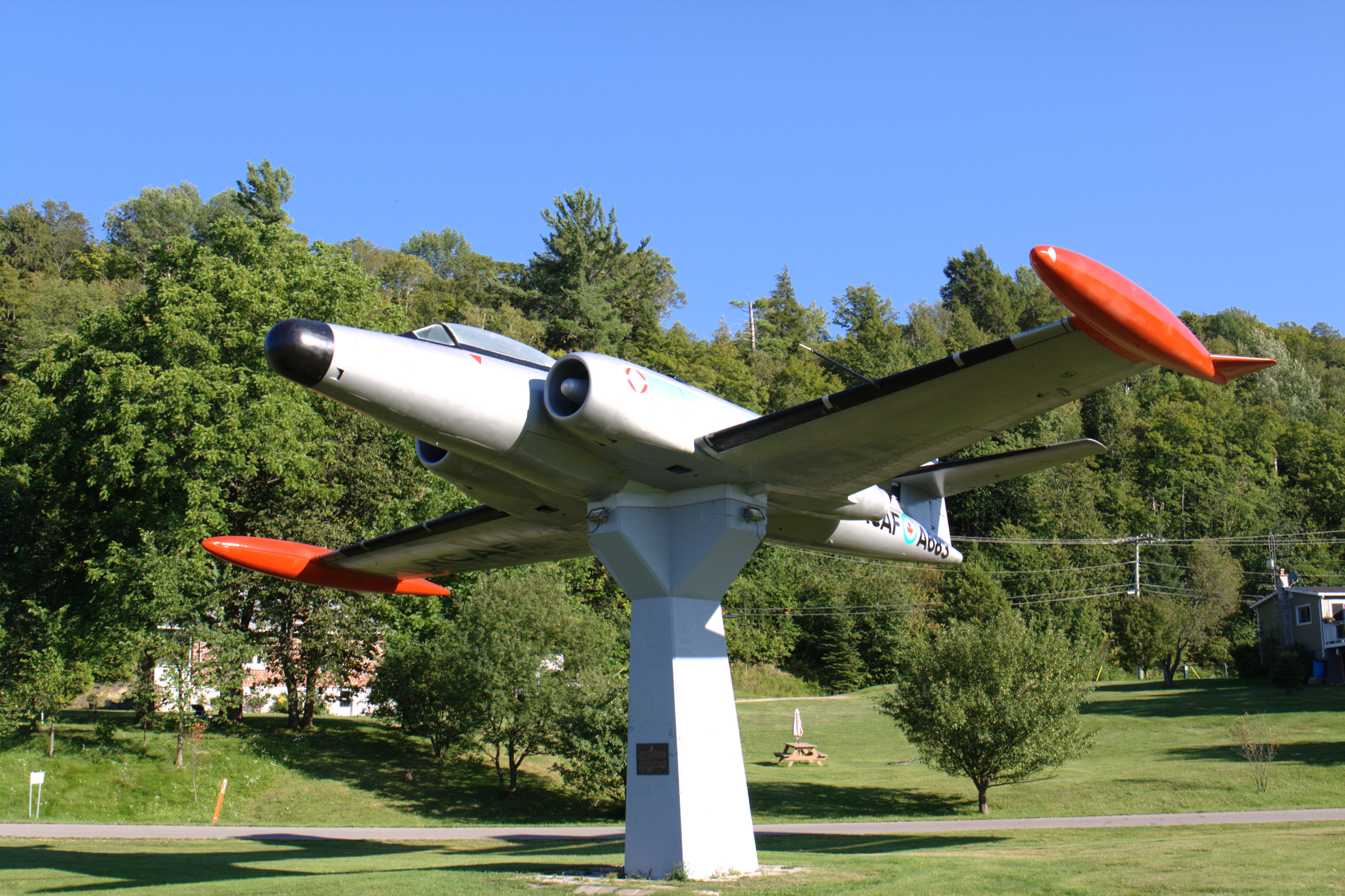
Canadian Forces CF-100 on display at Head Lake Park, Haliburton, Ontario

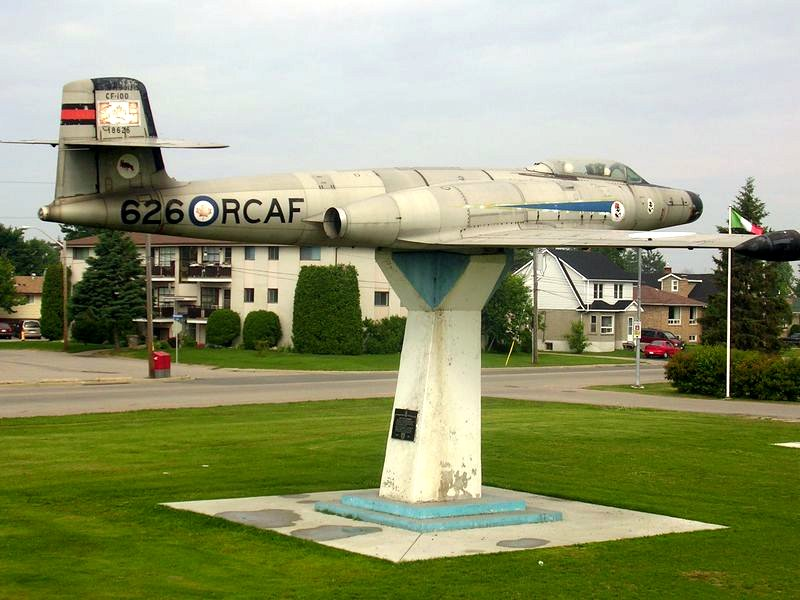
RCAF CF-100 at Lee Park, North Bay

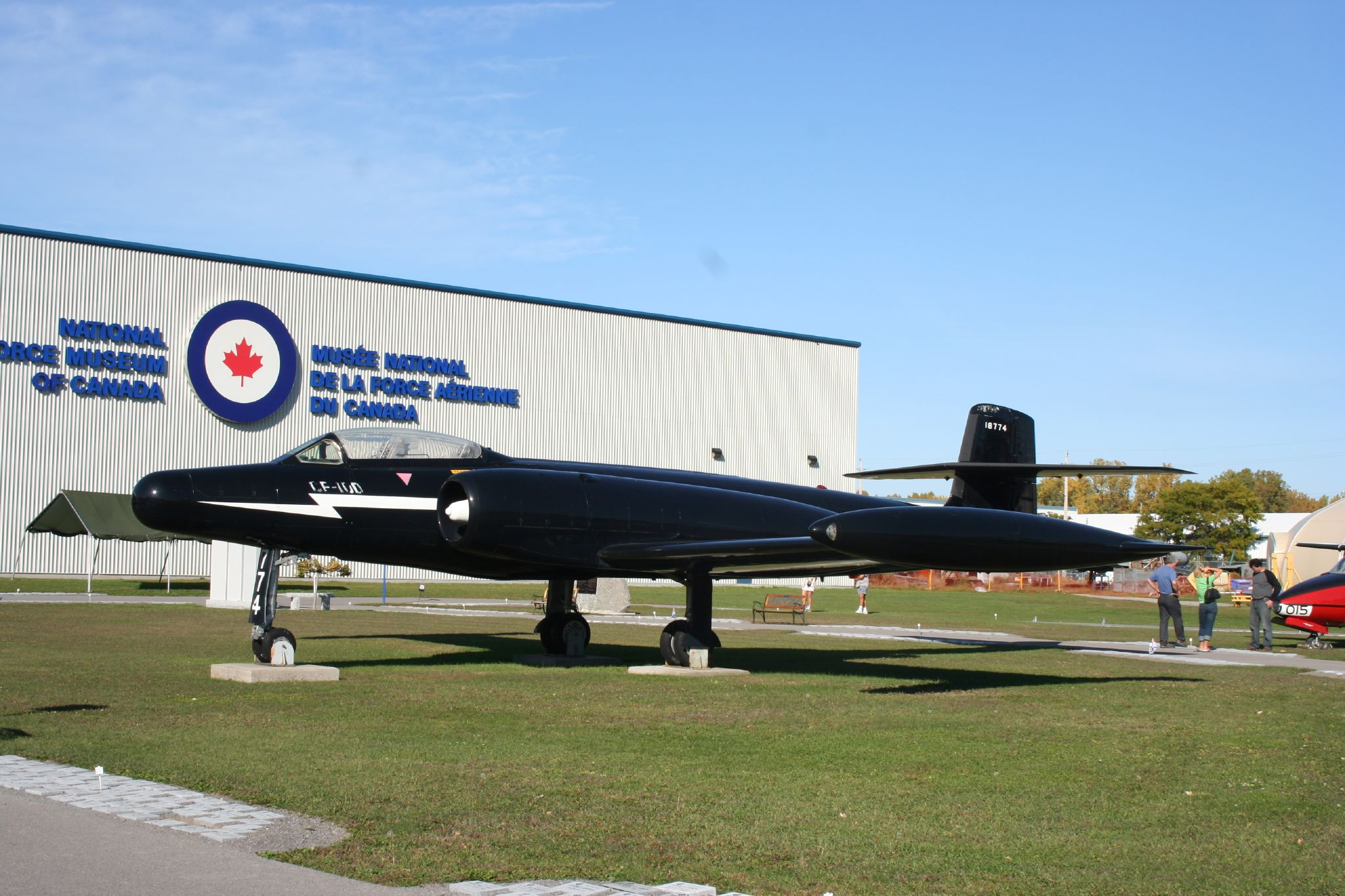
CF-100 National Air Force Museum of Canada, Trenton, Ontario

=== Belgium ===
- 18534 – CF-100 Mk.5 on static display at the Royal Museum of the Armed Forces and of Military History in Brussels.

=== Canada ===
- 18104 – CF-100 on static display at Canadian Forces Leadership and Recruit School in Saint-Jean-sur-Richelieu, Quebec.
- 18106 – CF-100 Mk.2 on static display at the Memorial Military Museum in Campbellford, Ontario.
- 18126 – CF-100 Mk.3D on static display at The Hangar Flight Museum in Calgary, Alberta.
- 18138 – CF-100 Mk.3B on static display at the Canadian Museum of Flight in Langley, British Columbia.
- 18152 – CF-100 Mk.3 on static display at the Bomber Command Museum of Canada in Nanton, Alberta.
- 18488 – CF-100 Mk.5 on static display in Centennial Park in Moncton, New Brunswick.
- 18500 – CF-100 Mk.5D on static display at CFB North Bay in North Bay, Ontario.
- 18506 – CF-100 Mk.4B in storage at the Canadian Air, Land, and Sea Museum in Toronto, Ontario. It was previously on display at the RCAFA 447 Wing at Hamilton International Airport, Mount Hope, Ontario.
- 18602 – CF-100 on static display at Haliburton Highlands High School in Haliburton, Ontario.
- 18619 – CF-100 Mk.5 on static display at Paul Coffey Park in Malton, Ontario.
- 18626 – CF-100 Mk.5M on static display at Lee Park in North Bay, Ontario.
- 18731 – CF-100 Mk.5 on static display at the Royal Military College of Canada in Kingston, Ontario.
- 18746 – CF-100 Mk.5 on static display at the Royal Military College Saint-Jean in Saint-Jean-sur-Richelieu, Quebec.
- 18759 – CF-100 on static display at the Reynolds-Alberta Museum in Wetaskiwin, Alberta.
- 18761 – CF-100 on static display at CFB Cold Lake in Cold Lake, Alberta.
- 18774 – CF-100 Mk.5 on static display at the National Air Force Museum of Canada in Trenton, Ontario.
- 18784 – CF-100 on static display at Air Force Heritage Park at CFB Winnipeg in Winnipeg, Manitoba.
- 100472 – CF-100 on static display at the Air Defence Museum at CFB Bagotville in Saguenay, Quebec.
- 100476 – CF-100 Mk.4B on static display at the Alberta Aviation Museum in Edmonton, Alberta.
- 100493 – CF-100 Mk.5D on ground display at the Base Borden Military Museum at CFB Borden near Barrie, Ontario.
- 100747 – CF-100 Mk.5 on static display at the Atlantic Canada Aviation Museum in Halifax, Nova Scotia.
- 100757 – CF-100 Mk.5D on static display at the Canada Aviation and Space Museum in Ottawa, Ontario.
- 100760 – CF-100 Mk.5 in storage at the Canadian War Museum in Ottawa, Ontario. It was previously on display at CFB St. Hubert in Saint-Hubert, Quebec.
- 100785 – CF-100 Mk.5D on static display at the Canadian Warplane Heritage Museum in Mount Hope, Ontario.
- 100790 – CF-100 on static display at the Comox Air Force Museum in Comox, British Columbia.

=== United Kingdom ===
- 18393 – CF-100 Mk.4B on static display at the Imperial War Museum Duxford in Duxford, Cambridgeshire.

=== United States ===
- 100779 – CF-100 Mk.5C on static display at the Peterson Air and Space Museum at Peterson Air Force Base near Colorado Springs, Colorado.
- 18241 – CF-100 Mk.4A on static display at the National Museum of the United States Air Force at Wright-Patterson AFB in Dayton, Ohio. It is painted in 428 Sqn colours.
- 100504 – CF-100 Mk.5 on static display at the Castle Air Museum at the former Castle AFB in Atwater, California.

== Specifications (CF-100 Mk 5) ==
Data from

General characteristics

- Crew: two
- Length: 54 ft 2 in (16.51 m)
- Wingspan: 57 ft 2 in (17.42 m)
- Height: 14 ft 6 in (4.42 m)
- Wing area: 591 sq ft (54.9 m^{2})
- Empty weight: 23,100 lb (10,478 kg)
- Gross weight: 33,450 lb (15,173 kg)
- Max takeoff weight: 36,000 lb (16,329 kg)
- Powerplant: 2 × Avro Canada Orenda 11 turbojet engines, 7,300 lbf (32 kN) thrust each

Performance

- Maximum speed: 552 mph (888 km/h, 480 kn)
- Range: 2,000 mi (3,200 km, 1,700 nmi)
- Service ceiling: 45,000 ft (14,000 m)
- Rate of climb: 8,750 ft/min (44.5 m/s)
- Thrust/weight: 0.44

Armament

- Rockets: 2 wingtip pods of 29 x 70-mm (2.75 in) "Mighty Mouse" fin-folding aerial rockets

Avionics

- Radar

== See also ==
- Aerospace Heritage Foundation of Canada
- Avro Canada CF-105 Arrow - the design intended to replace the CF-100

Related development

- Avro Canada CF-103

Aircraft of comparable role, configuration, and era

- Douglas F3D Skyknight
- Gloster Javelin
- Lockheed F-94 Starfire
- Northrop F-89 Scorpion
- Sud Aviation Vautour
- Yakovlev Yak-25

Related lists

- List of aircraft of Canada's air forces
