= Avro Canada Orenda =

1940s Canadian turbojet aircraft engine

TR5 Orenda
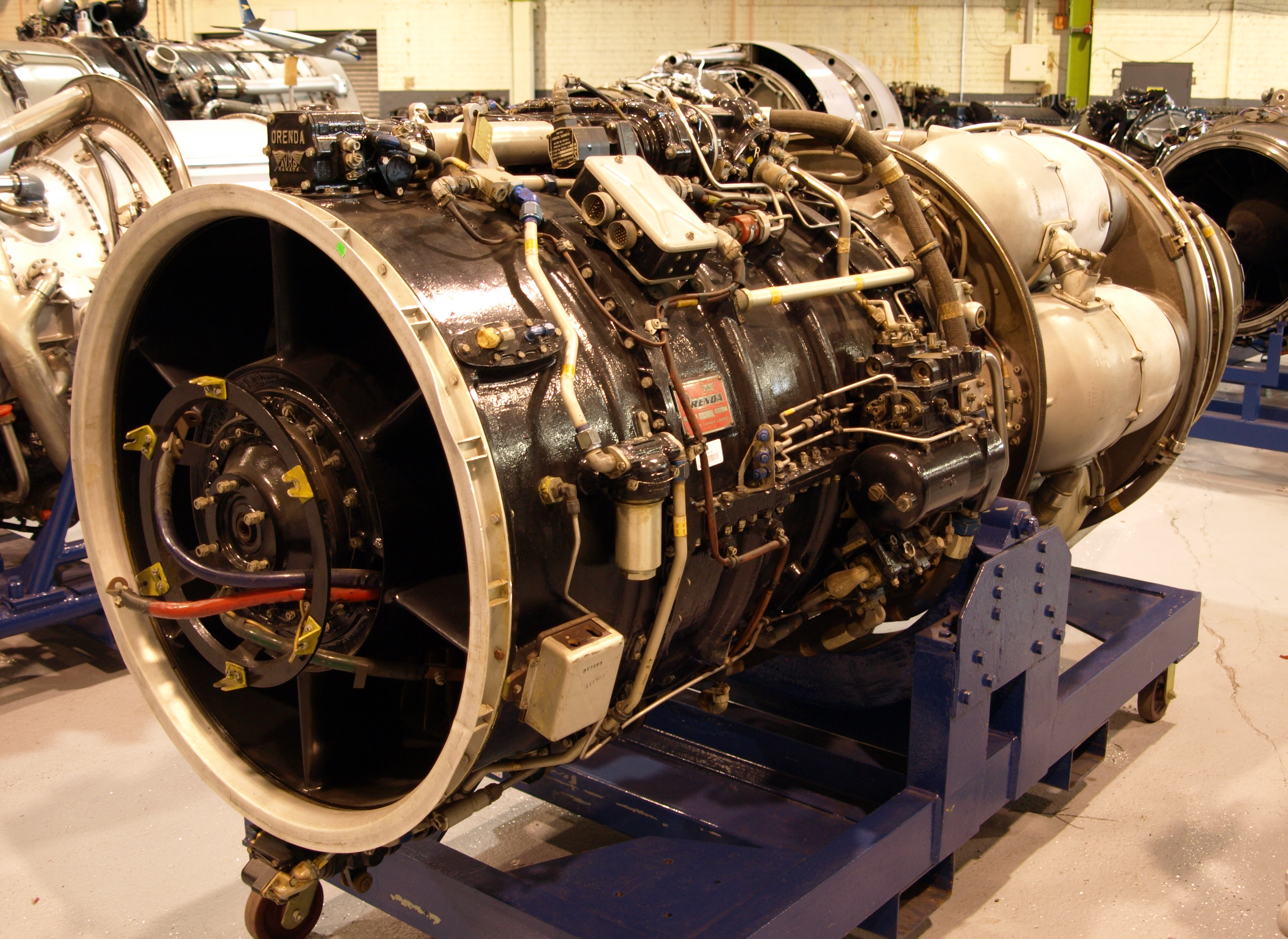
- Avro Canada Orenda 10 turbojet engine on display at the Rolls-Royce Heritage Trust, Derby
- Type: Turbojet
- National origin: Canada
- Manufacturer: Avro Canada
- First run: 1949
- Major applications: Avro CF-100; Canadair Sabre
- Number built: 4000+
- Developed from: Avro Canada Chinook

The Avro Canada TR5 Orenda was the first production jet engine from Avro Canada's Gas Turbine Division. Similar to other early jet engines in design, like the Rolls-Royce Avon or General Electric J47.

Over 4,000 Orendas of various marks were delivered during the 1950s.

== Development ==
The Orenda design started in the summer of 1946 when the Royal Canadian Air Force (RCAF) placed an order with Avro Canada for a new night/all-weather fighter. To power the design, Avro decided to build their own engines. Avro had recently purchased Turbo Research, a former crown corporation set up in Leaside, Toronto, to develop jet engines.

Turbo Research was in the midst of designing their first engine, the 3,000 lbf (13 kN) TR.4 Chinook, which could easily be scaled up for the new fighter design. It was decided to continue working on the Chinook to gain experience even though they had no intention of producing it.

As work on the Chinook continued, Avro's newly christened Gas Turbine Division started work on the larger 6,000 lbf (27 kN) thrust design needed for the RCAF contract. Winnett Boyd started detailed design in autumn 1946, and a formal contract was received in April 1947. The only major change was the addition of a tenth compressor stage of stainless steel, and changing the third stage from aluminum to steel as well. The design work was completed on 15 January 1948, just prior to the first run of the Chinook on 17 March 1948. During the design Joseph Lucas of the UK was contracted to help with the combustion design, which led to a slight delay as they recommended using a longer combustion chamber than originally designed. The resulting TR-5 was named "Orenda", an Iroquois word meaning "tribal soul on the right path".

Given the experience of the Chinook, and the fact that the two designs were similar in many ways, progress on the Orenda was rapid. Parts started arriving in 1948, and the first engine was completed and run for the first time on 8 February 1949. Avro was so confident of the design that they invited high-ranking officials from the RCAF and Canadian government to witness this very first test, which went off without a hitch after fixing a minor electrical problem. Within two months the engine had already passed 100 hours of running time, and on 10 May had reached its design thrust of 6,000 lbf (27 kN). At the time, it was the most powerful jet engine in the world, although it held this record only briefly until the Rolls-Royce Avon RA.3 was introduced the next year.

By 1 July it had passed 500 hours, and had run for 477 of these before requiring a rebuild. In September it was on its way to 1,000 hours when a technician's lab coat was sucked into the engine, complete with a set of razor blades in his pocket. From then on testing was carried out with a set of metal rings in the intake to avoid ingesting foreign objects. After repairing the damage the engine returned to testing, now joined by two further examples of the Orenda 1. Together they passed a total of 2,000 hours by 10 February 1950. By this point a problem with fatigue cracks in the seventh and eighth stages had become apparent, which required them to be redesigned and made much thicker. This solved the problem, and by July they had passed 3,000 hours.

Flight testing started with a converted Avro Lancaster, FM209, one of the many Mk.10's built at the Victory Aircraft (now Avro) plants during the war. The two outboard Merlin engines were replaced with the Orendas, and the new aircraft took to the sky on 10 July. Avro test pilots flight tested the aircraft across Lake Ontario to the Buffalo, New York area, where they were able to easily outperform the P-47 Thunderbolts of the Air National Guard that were sent to investigate. In one incident at an airshow, all four engines were turned off by mistake, but the Orenda's quick start time allowed them to save the day. The aircraft ran up 500 hours by July 1954, when this portion of flight testing ended; it was destroyed in a hangar fire on 24 July 1956.

=== Production ===
The Orenda 2 was the first production model, passing its qualification tests in February 1952. This version showed additional cracking in the ninth stage, and had to be strengthened like the earlier model. Even before being qualified, the engine had been fitted to the Avro CF-100 and flown on 20 June 1952, with a squadron of pre-production Mk.2 aircraft entering RCAF service on 17 October. The Orenda 3 was similar, but had a number of modifications to allow it to be mounted in the Sabre in place of the J47. One example was produced and sent to North American Aviation.

The first real production model was the Orenda 8, which was the powerplant of the CF-100 Mk.3. This model was first flown in September 1952 and entered service in 1953. This was soon followed by the Orenda 9 powered Mk.4 that flew on 11 October 1952, and then by the rocket-armed Mk.4A with the 7,400 lbf (33 kN) Orenda 11. The Orenda 11 demanded higher airflow through the engine, and featured a second turbine stage to power the more powerful compressor. The 11 would be the primary production version for the CF-100, powering the Mk.4A and all future versions, with over 1,000 engines produced.

While work on the CF-100 continued the RCAF also started looking at a new day fighter, eventually selecting the Sabre. A single Sabre 3 was built with the Orenda 4 engine, with performance similar to the US models. Production then turned to the Sabre 5 with the Orenda 10, and then to the Sabre 6 with the Orenda 11-derived 7,500 lbf (33,000 N) thrust Orenda 14. The resulting Sabre was both lighter and more powerful than its J47 powered counterparts, and went on to set a number of air speed records. Most notable among these was Jacqueline Cochran's supersonic flight in the sole Sabre 3, which Canadair loaned to her for the effort. Canadair built 1,815 Sabres in total, 937 of these equipped with Orendas. Several examples, notably one at Boeing, serving into the 1970s.

The engine was so successful that the Gas Turbine Division was renamed Orenda Engines when Hawker Siddeley reorganized their Canadian operations in 1955.

By 1953 the Orenda was planned to have been joined by an engine in the 10,000 lbf (44 kN) thrust range, the Waconda.

== Design ==
The Orenda was fairly conventional in layout, built in three main parts; compressor, combustion area, and turbine/exhaust.

At the front was the compressor section, containing the ten-stage compressor housed in a tapering magnesium alloy shell. The shell was machined with grooves that held the stators. At the front of the compressor was an intake fairing with a prominent "nose cone" containing the front main bearing. Four guide vanes held the cone in place, with two power takeoff shafts running inside two of them to power the top- and bottom-mounted accessories section (fuel pumps, oil pumps). The nose cone also held the electric starter motor, which acted as a generator once the engine was up and running. The engines used on the CF-100 also contained a uniquely Canadian invention, two prominent winglets at the very front that sprayed alcohol into the intake as a de-icing system. The CF-100 versions also mounted the debris cage, mentioned earlier.

The compressor had ten axial stages of mixed steel and aluminum construction. In the original Orenda 8, 9 and 10's this operated at a 5.5:1 compression ratio, compared to about 3.5 for wartime designs. The hub consisted of three aluminum disks carrying the first nine stages, and a steel disk bolted onto the end carrying the tenth. The central casing held the power shaft and was made from magnesium alloy. Around it were the six flame cans. The turbine was made of solid Inconel blades attached to an austenitic steel hub. The blades were air cooled by bleeding off compressed air from the fifth compressor stage and piping it to the turbine face, the six pipes lying between the flame cans. The exhaust section consisted of welded steel sheeting.

== Variants ==
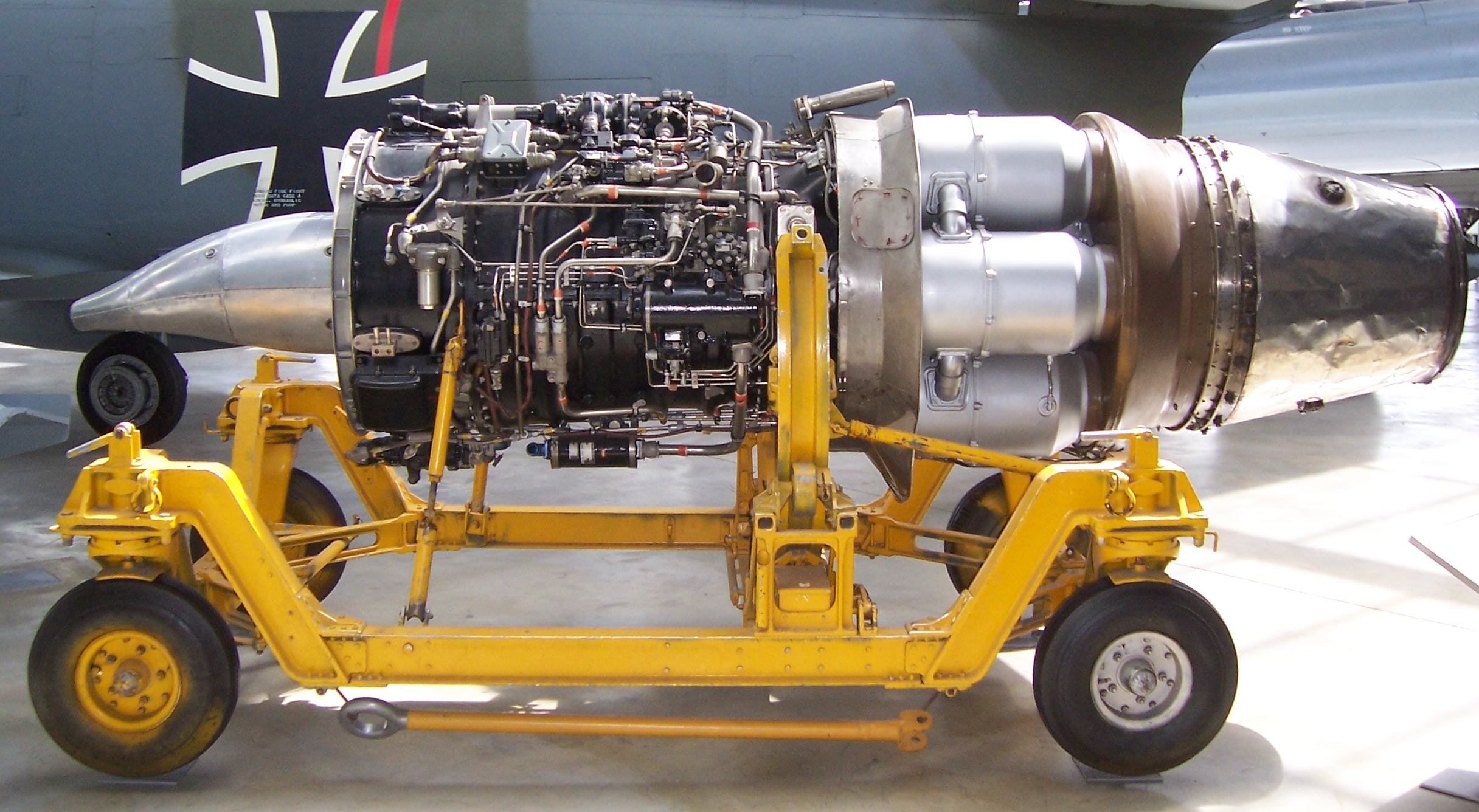
Orenda 14

Data from:Aircraft engines of the World 1959/60, Aircraft engines of the World 1953

Orenda 1
original prototype models, 6,000 lbf (27 kN)
Orenda 2
first production model
Orenda 3
An Orenda 1 modified for installation in a North American F-86A Sabre, becoming the first Orenda to fly under its own power.
Orenda 8
improved reliability, 6,000 lbf (27 kN)
Orenda 9
improved thrust, 6,500 lbf (29 kN), required some changes to the nacelles
Orenda 10
Orenda 9 adapted for the Sabre
Orenda 11
main production version for the CF-100, 7,400 lbf (33 kN)
Orenda 11R
with afterburner
Orenda 14
similar to the 7,500 lbf (33 kN) Orenda 11, used on both the CF-100 and Sabre
Orenda 17
combined the compressor from the 9 with the turbine of the 11, along with an afterburner 8,490 lbf (37.8 kN) wet

== Specifications (Orenda 14) ==
Data from Aircraft engines of the World 1959/60

==== General characteristics ====
- Type: Turbojet
- Length: 121.51 in (308.6 cm)
- Diameter: 42 in (110 cm)
- Dry weight: 2,430 lb (1,100 kg) dry

==== Components ====
- Compressor: 10-stage axial flow
- Combustors: can type, 6
- Turbine: two-stage axial flow
- Fuel type: JP-1 or JP-4
- Oil system: Dry sump pressure spray at 18 psi (1.2 bar), one pressure pump with four scavenge pumps, with auxiliary scavenge pump for centre and rear bearings

==== Performance ====
- Maximum thrust: 7,500 lbf (33 kN) at 7,800 rpm for take-off
- Overall pressure ratio: 6.1:1
- Air mass flow: 125 lb/s (57 kg/s)
- Turbine inlet temperature:

Turbine Inlet Temperature (TIT): 1,682 °F (917 °C; 1,190 K) at 7,800 rpm
Jet Pipe Temperature (JPT): 1,319 °F (715 °C; 988 K) at 7,800 rpm

- Specific fuel consumption: 0.9 lb/lbf/h (92 kg/kN/h)
- Thrust-to-weight ratio: 3.09

== See also ==
Comparable engines

- General Electric J47
- Rolls-Royce Avon

Related lists

- List of aircraft engines
