= Winnett Boyd =

Canadian engineer

Winnett Boyd (October 17, 1916 – January 30, 2017) was a Canadian engineer who made major contributions to the development of the jet engine and nuclear reactor design.

== Early life and education ==
Boyd's father, Winnett Wornibe Boyd, was stationed in Wales during World War I, where he met Marjorie Sterne St. George, an American. They married, and in 1917 returned to Winnett's home town in Bobcaygeon, Ontario. Growing up, Boyd lived in Bobcaygeon, Port Hope, Bermuda and Toronto.

In 1935, Winnett began studying mechanical engineering at the University of Toronto's School of Practical Science. He graduated with a B.Sc. in 1939 and was offered a staff scholarship by the Massachusetts Institute of Technology (MIT). He completed one year of graduate studies at MIT as well as a teaching assistantship.

== Engineering career ==
Between 1940 and 1943, Boyd worked as an engineer for Demerara Bauxite in British Guiana, and for the Aluminum Company of Canada in Montreal and Shawinigan Falls.

In the fall of 1943, Boyd joined the Royal Canadian Navy, but was soon sent to the National Research Council (NRC). During this time the NRC was in the midst of implementing the suggestions of the Banks Report, which suggested ways of helping with the UK's jet engine development. Among its suggestions was the creation of a cold weather testing station, which the British could not supply as easily as the Canadians, as well as the creation of a local jet engine manufacturer in order to avoid dependence on the UK or US. The NRC sent a number of engineers, including Boyd, to study jet engine design in the United Kingdom over the next year. In the meantime, the government formed Turbo Research as a Crown Corporation in Leaside, now part of downtown Toronto. A number of the engineers involved in the creation of the Report worked there, while others created the Cold Weather Testing Station in Winnipeg.

On his return to Canada in 1944, the NRC sent Boyd to Turbo Research. The team initially had to decide between the centrifugal or axial engine designs, and Boyd outlined designs based on both, the TR.1 being the centrifugal version, and the TR.2 and TR.3 being two variations of the axial design. The team eventually decided to move directly to the more promising axial design, and started real work on the TR.3 in 1945. Boyd split off to start work on a smaller design, the TR.4, which was later named the Chinook. Work on the TR.3 was later abandoned.

In 1946 Turbo Research was sold to Avro Canada, and Boyd became the Chief Designer of what was known as their Gas Turbine Division. In September 1946 they started development of the much larger TR.5, which soon became known as the Orenda. The Chinook ran for the first time in 1948, but was largely abandoned by that point. The Orenda ran for the first time in February 1949, and matured into a superb design that was the most powerful production engine between 1949 and 1952. Over the next few years just under 4,000 examples would be produced, and used on a variety of designs including the Avro CF-100 Cannuck and Canadair versions of the F-86 Sabre. Boyd resigned from Avro on December 31, 1950 after the company started planning a major reorganization and suggested Boyd become a consultant.

In 1951, he founded a consulting firm as Winnett Boyd Limited. At about the same time, he started working as a consulting engineer for the C.D. Howe Company, where he was responsible for the design of the National Research Universal Reactor, or NRU. The NRU operated at the Atomic Energy of Canada plant in Chalk River until 2018. The NRU was considered one of the world's finest research reactors and produced a large supply of isotopes, used for medical reasons.

In 1956, Boyd began designing the Daniels-Boyd Nuclear Steam Generator (D-BNSG), a nuclear powerplant based on Farrington Daniels' pebble bed reactor design. After two years of promoting the D-BNSG, the project was ended. He later wrote on the topic, notably in The Nuclear Future of Canada in 1958/59. In 1959, Boyd became the first President of Arthur D. Little's Canadian affiliate in Toronto. He worked there until his retirement in 1981, while maintaining his work at Winnett Boyd Limited.

== Later interests ==
Boyd attended the Pugwash Conferences in 1965 and 1967. Boyd was a founding member of the Canadian Association for the Club of Rome, which is also concerned with world affairs.

Boyd ran for the Progressive Conservatives in the 1972 General Election in the York—Scarborough riding, but lost to the Liberal candidate, Robert Stanbury. He used this campaign to publicly discuss the capitalist ideologies of his friend, Louis O. Kelso. In 1974, Boyd co-founded BMG Publishing with Kenneth McDonald and Orville Gaines. BMG published eight books pertaining to Canadian politics between 1975 and 1979.

Boyd began developing a bicycle brake in the 1970s. In the early 1990s he built bicycles called the BMG Suburban, equipped with the back-pedalling brake he invented. Boyd sold these bicycles independently.

Boyd won numerous engineering awards, including the University of Toronto's Engineering Alumni Medal in 1948, becoming an Associate Fellow of the Canadian Aeronautical Institute in 1954, and a certificate of recognition from the Corporation of Professional Engineers of Quebec in 1959. In 1981, Boyd was inducted into the University of Toronto's Engineering Alumni Hall of Distinction.

Boyd's writing has been published widely in a variety of periodicals. He has also had three books published: Personal Thoughts: A Series on the Canadian Prospect (1966), The National Dilemma and the Way Out with Kenneth McDonald (1975), and Rebel Engineer (1998).

Winnett Boyd retired to Bobcaygeon. He died on Monday, January 30, 2017 at the Victoria Manor long term care facility in Lindsay, Ontario at age 100.
