= RAF Ahlhorn =

Former RAF station in Germany

RAF Ahlhorn (Advanced Landing Ground B-111)
- Ahlhorn, Lower Saxony in Germany
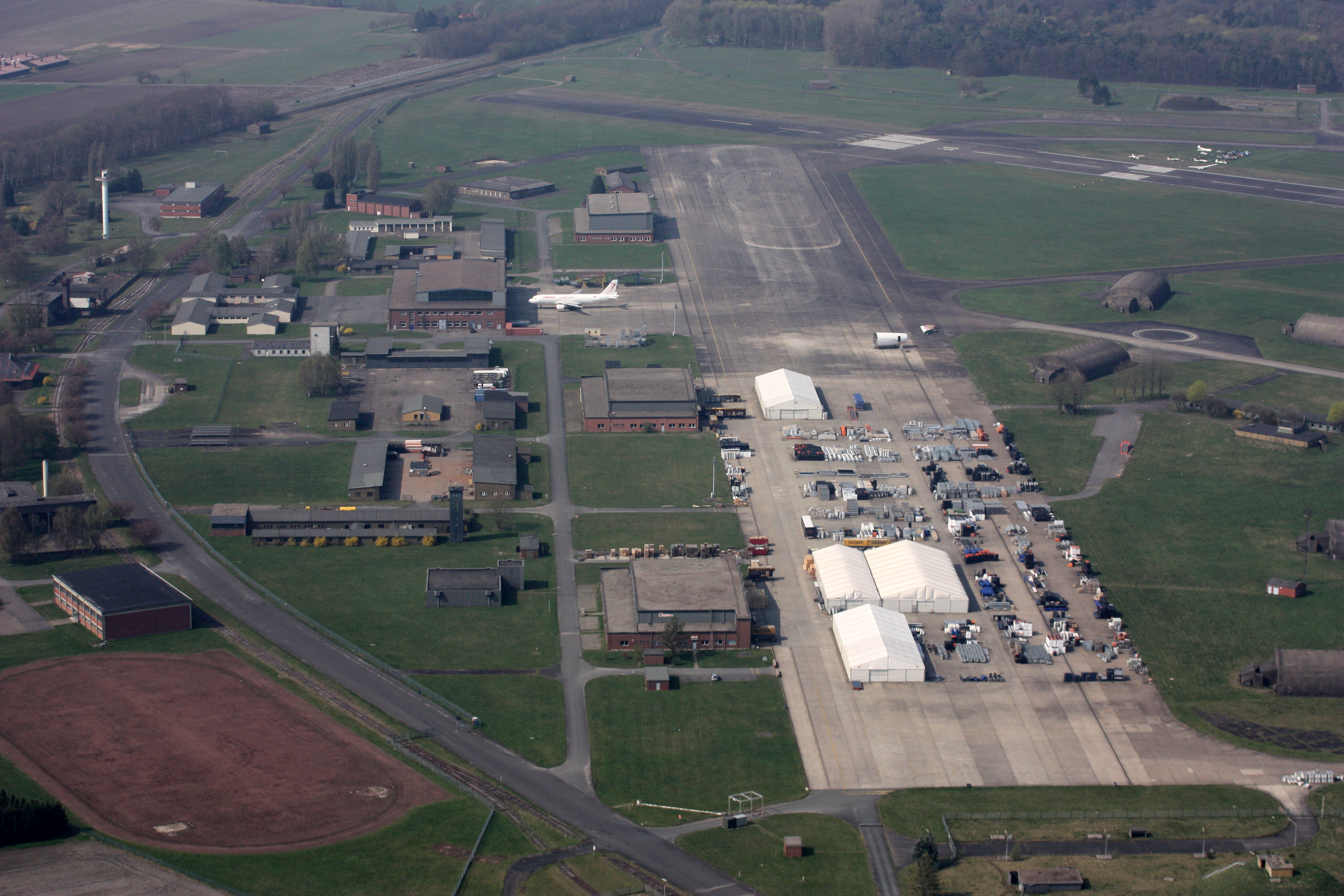
- Former RAF Ahlhorn in 2010

Site information
- Type: Royal Air Force station
- Owner: Air Ministry (UK)
- Operator: Royal Air Force
- Controlled by: RAF Second Tactical Air Force

Location
- Shown within Lower Saxony, Germany
- Coordinates: 52°53′06″N 008°13′57″E

Site history
- Built: 1944
- In use: 1945-1958

Airfield information
- Identifiers: ICAO: ETNA
- Elevation: 49 metres (161 ft) AMSL
Runways
Direction	Length and surface
09/27	2,106 metres (6,909 ft) Asphalt

Royal Air Force Ahlhorn or more simply RAF Ahlhorn, is a former Royal Air Force station located 1 mile (1.6 km) south east of the centre of Ahlhorn, Lower Saxony and 11 miles (18 km) north of Vechta, Lower Saxony, Germany.

Originally, it was a German airbase for Zeppelins. The Royal Air Force (RAF) disestablished the station and it was closed down in the autumn of 1958 and was transferred to the Bundeswehr. It was a private airport before being converted to a solar park in 2011.

== History ==
=== First World War ===
Built during the First World War in the summer of 1915 for Zeppelins four large hangars were built. In two pairs, the hangars measured 240 metres (790 ft) in length, 60 metres (200 ft) in width and 35 metres (115 ft) in height. The hangars were named "Albrecht" and "Aladin" (northern pair), and "Alrun" and "Alix" (southern pair). On 5 January 1918 Ahlhorn hangars explosion that destroyed the LZ 87 (L 47), LZ 94 (L 46), LZ 97 (L 51), LZ 105 (L 58), and SL 20. Fifteen killed, 134 injured.

=== Ahlhorn Hangar explosion ===
Production number	Class	Tactical numbering	First flight	Remarks	Image
Zeppelin LZ 87	R	L 47	11 May 1917	18 reconnaissance missions and three attacks dropping 3,240 kg (7,140 lb) of bombs around the North Sea and England. On 5 January 1918, a giant explosion in the air base in Ahlhorn destroyed four Zeppelins (including L 47) and one non-Zeppelin built airship, housed in one adjacent hangar and two 0.5 mi (0.80 km) away.	
Zeppelin LZ 94	T	L 46	24 April 1917	19 reconnaissance missions around the North Sea; 3 raids on England dropping 5,700 kg (12,600 lb) of bombs	
Zeppelin LZ 97	U	L 51	6 June 1917	3 reconnaissance missions; one raid on the English coast, dropping 280 kg bombs	
Zeppelin LZ 105	V	L 58	29 October 1917	Two reconnaissance missions	
S.L.20	(Type 'f')	L 58	9 September 1917	Two missions	

=== Second World War and beyond ===
During the Second World War the airfield was used as an Advanced Landing Ground before becoming a permanent RAF station.

Squadron	Aircraft	From	To	To	Notes
No. 14 Squadron RAF	Hawker Hunter F.4/F.6	26 September 1957	15 September 1958	RAF Gütersloh	
No. 16 Squadron RAF	Hawker Tempest F.2	8 May 1947	20 May 1947	RAF Fassberg	
No. 20 Squadron RAF	Hawker Hunter F.6	23 September 1957	30 August 1958	RAF Gütersloh	
No. 26 Squadron RAF	Hawker Tempest F.2	8 May 1947	20 May 1947	RAF Fassberg	
No. 26 Squadron RAF	Hawker Hunter F.6	7 June 1958	8 September 1958	RAF Gütersloh	
No. 33 Squadron RAF	Hawker Tempest F.2	8 May 1947	20 May 1947	RAF Fassberg	
No. 96 Squadron RAF	Gloster Meteor NF.11	17 November 1952	12 February 1958	RAF Geilenkirchen	Reformed here
No. 149 Squadron RAF	English Electric Canberra B.2	24 August 1954	17 September 1954	RAF Gütersloh	
No. 193 Squadron RAF	Hawker Typhoon Ib	30 April 1945	8 January 1945	RAF Hildesheim	
No. 197 Squadron RAF	Hawker Typhoon Ib	30 April 1945	8 June 1945	RAF Hildesheim	
No. 213 Squadron RAF	English Electric Canberra B(I).6	1 September 1955	22 August 1957	RAF Bruggen	Reformed here.
No. 256 Squadron RAF	Gloster Meteor NF.11	17 November 1952	12 February 1958	RAF Geilenkirchen	
No. 263 Squadron RAF	Hawker Typhoon Ib	30 April 1945	8 June 1945	RAF Hildesheim	
No. 266 Squadron RAF	Hawker Typhoon Ib	4 June 1945	8 June 1945	RAF Hildesheim	
No. 302 Polish Fighter Squadron	Supermarine Spitfire XVI	16 September 1945	27 August 1946	RAF Sylt	
No. 302 Polish Fighter Squadron	Supermarine Spitfire XVI	31 August 1946	7 October 1946	RAF Hethel	
No. 308 Polish Fighter Squadron	Supermarine Spitfire XVI	16 September 1945	22 January 1946	RAF Sylt	
No. 308 Polish Fighter Squadron	Supermarine Spitfire XVI	9 February 1946	7 October 1946	RAF Hethel	
No. 317 Polish Fighter Squadron	Supermarine Spitfire XVI	15 September 1945	July 1946	RAF Sylt	
No. 317 Polish Fighter Squadron	Supermarine Spitfire XVI	16 August 1946	7 October 1946	RAF Hethel	

Units:

- No. 418 Air Stores Park between 5 and 7 May 1945
- No. 8 Section of No. 422 Aviation Fuel and Ammunition Park from 29 June 1945
- No. 6014 Servicing Echelon between 26 September 1957 and 15 September 1958 supporting 14 Squadron
- No. 6193 Servicing Echelon between 30 April and 8 June 1945 supporting 193 Squadron
- No. 6197 Servicing Echelon between 5 May and 8 June 1945 supporting 197 Squadron
- No. 6263 Servicing Echelon between 30 April and June 1945 supporting 263 Squadron
- No. 6266 Servicing Echelon between 4 and 6 June 1945 supporting 266 Squadron
- No. 6302 (Polish) Servicing Echelon between 16 September 1945 and 16 October 1946 supporting 302 Squadron
- No. 6308 (Polish) Servicing Echelon between 16 September 1945 and 7 October 1946 supporting 308 Squadron
- Ahlhorn Station Flight used Prentice T.1, Canberra T.4, Vampire T.11 & Chipmunk T.10
- 2nd Tactical Air Force Tactical Development Unit between 18 February and 19 October 1953
- No. 131 (Polish) (Fighter) Wing RAF between 12 September 1945 and 15 October 1946
- No. 146 Wing RAF between 30 April and 6 June 1945

== Current use ==
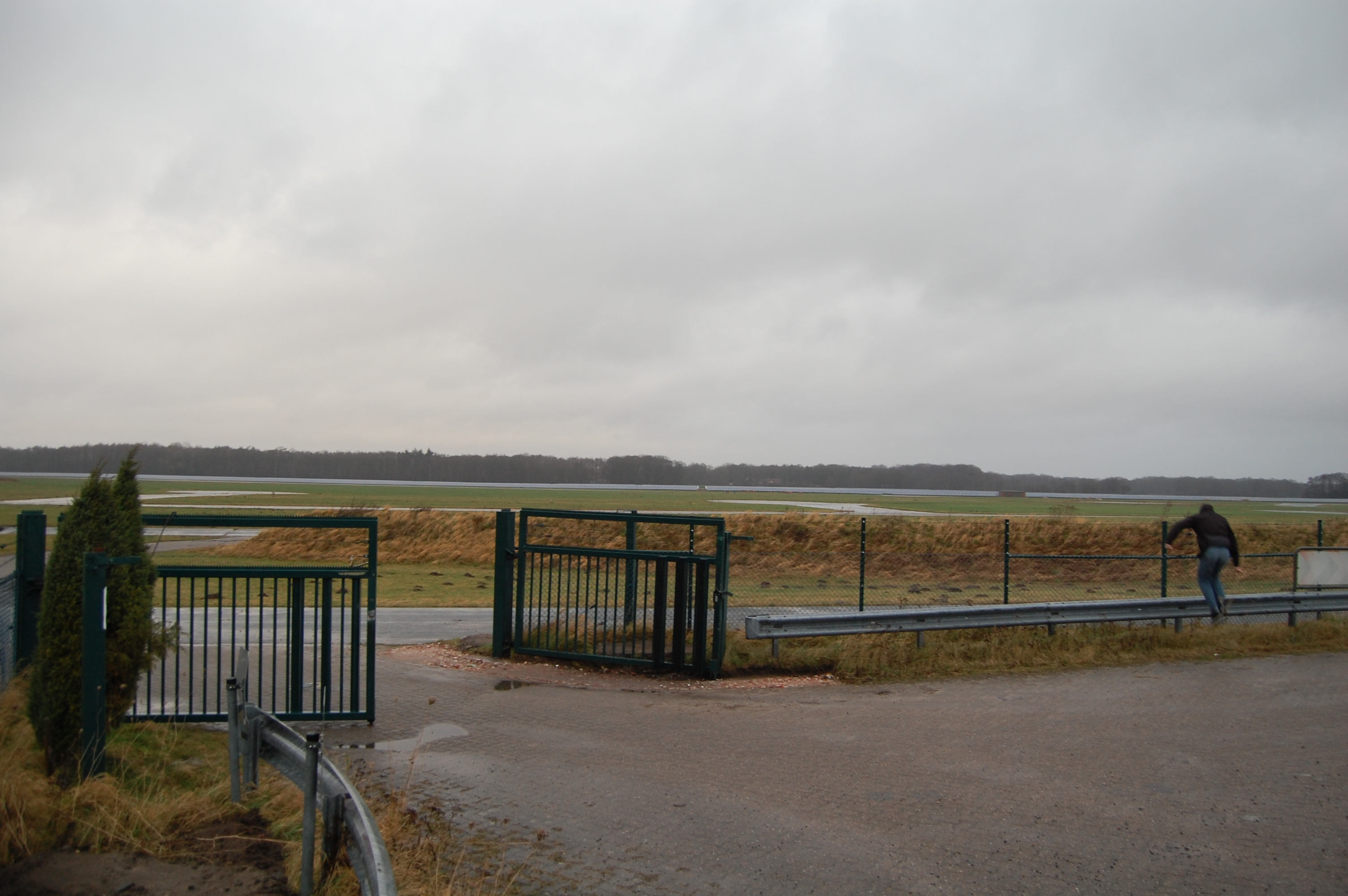
A number of solar panels are now visible on the site

Jagdgeschwader 73 was formed at Ahlhorn and Oldenburg on 1 April 1959. Jagdgeschwader 71 of the German Air Force were to take residence from June 1959 with 50 Canadair Sabres, Germany's first operational jet fighter unit. They remained at Ahlhorn until 1961.

=== Solarpark Ahlhorn ===
From 2005 the Aircraft Maintenance Service GmbH provided services on widebody aircraft but the company went bankrupt in 2009. A number of solar panels were installed on most of the airfield converting it into Solarpark Ahlhorn. Opening in 2011 the solar panels provide, 17.5 MW. There is only one airstrip in use.

== See also ==
- List of former Royal Air Force stations
