= No. 125 Expeditionary Air Wing =

No. 125 Expeditionary Air Wing RAF Previous units: No. 125 Airfield Headquarters RAF No. 125 (Fighter) Wing RAF No. 125 (Night Fighter) Wing RAF
- Active: April 2006 - 2013; 1943-44; 1944-45; 1953-58
- Country: United Kingdom
- Branch: Royal Air Force
- Type: Expeditionary Air Wing
- Last base: RAF Leuchars

No. 125 Expeditionary Air Wing is a former deployable Expeditionary Air Wing of the Royal Air Force based at RAF Leuchars, Fife, Scotland.

The current wing was established on 1 April 2006 the wing has history dating back to May 1944:

== Second World War ==
No. 125 (Fighter) Wing within No. 15 Sector RAF, No. 83 Group RAF, RAF Second Tactical Air Force at RAF Ford on 12 May 1944. It moved to B.2 Bazenville, B.11 Longues, B.42 (redesignated A-61) Beauvais/Nivelles, B.70 Antwerp/Deurne, B.82 Grave, B.64 Diest, Y.32 Ophoven, B.78 Eindhoven, B.106 Twente/Enschede, B.118 Celle, B.160 Kastrup, B.172 Husum and finally B.158 Lubeck where the wing was disbanded on 14 July 1945.

Squadrons:

- No. 132 (City of Bombay) Squadron RAF (12 May 1944 to 28 September 1944)
- No. 453 Squadron RAAF (12 May 1944 to 28 September 1944)
- No. 602 (City of Glasgow) Squadron AAF (12 May 1944 to 28 September 1944)
- No. 441 Squadron RCAF (14 July 1944 to 28 September 1944)
- No. 137 Squadron RAF (Unknown to 13 August 1944)
- No. 80 Squadron RAF (28 September 1944 to 1 October 1944)
- No. 130 (Punjab) Squadron RAF (28 September 1944 to 10 May 1945)
- No. 274 Squadron RAF (28 September 1944 to 7 October 1944)
- No. 402 Squadron RCAF (28 September 1944 to 27 December 1944)
- No. 41 Squadron RAF (8 November 1944 to 25 January 1945)
- No. 350 (Belgian) Squadron RAF (8 November 1944 to 14 July 1945)
- No. 610 (County of Chester) Squadron AAF (8 November 1944 to 21 February 1945)
- No. 41 Squadron RAF (21 March 1945 to 14 July 1945)
- No. 137 Squadron RAF (7 May 1945 to Unknown)
- No. 486 Squadron RAAF (12 May 1945 to 14 July 1945)

=== History of No. 125 Airfield ===
No. 125 Airfield Headquarters was formed on 24 June 1943 at RAF Gravesend within No. 83 Group RAF, it moved to RAF Newchurch on 2 July 1943. The unit then moved to RAF Detling on 12 October 1943 then to RAF Ford on 4 May 1944. The HQ was disbanded still at Ford on 12 May 1944 to become No. 125 (Fighter) Wing RAF.

Squadrons:

- No. 19 Squadron RAF (24 June 1943 to 18 August 1943) replaced by No. 184 Squadron RAF (18 August 1943 to 12 May 1944)
- No. 132 (City of Bombay) Squadron RAF (24 June 1943 to 12 May 1944)
- No. 175 Squadron RAF (5 August 1943 to 12 August 1943) replaced by No. 602 (City of Glasgow) Squadron AAF (13 August 1943 to 12 May 1944)
- No. 453 Squadron RAAF (19 January 1944 to 12 May 1944)

== Post war ==
The wing was reformed on 1 April 1953 at RAF Ahlhorn as No. 125 (Night Fighter) Wing, it controlled:

- No. 96 Squadron RAF (1 April 1953 to 12 February 1958)
- No. 256 Squadron RAF (1 April 1953 to 12 February 1958)
- No. 213 (Ceylon) Squadron RAF (1 September 1955 to 22 August 1957)
- No. 14 Squadron RAF (26 September 1957 to 1 September 1958)
- No. 20 Squadron RAF (26 September 1957 to 1 September 1958)

It was disbanded on 1 September 1958 still at Ahlhorn.
