= Oldenburg Air Base =

Former military airbase in Lower Saxony, Germany

Oldenburg Air Base
- Oldenburg, Lower Saxony in Germany

Site information
- Owner: Bundeswehr
- Operator: German Air Force; Royal Air Force (–1957); Luftwaffe (–1945)
- Controlled by: Royal Air Force Germany (–1957)

Location
- Shown within Lower Saxony
- Coordinates: 53°10′47″N 8°09′56″E

Site history
- Built: 1933
- In use: 1933–1994

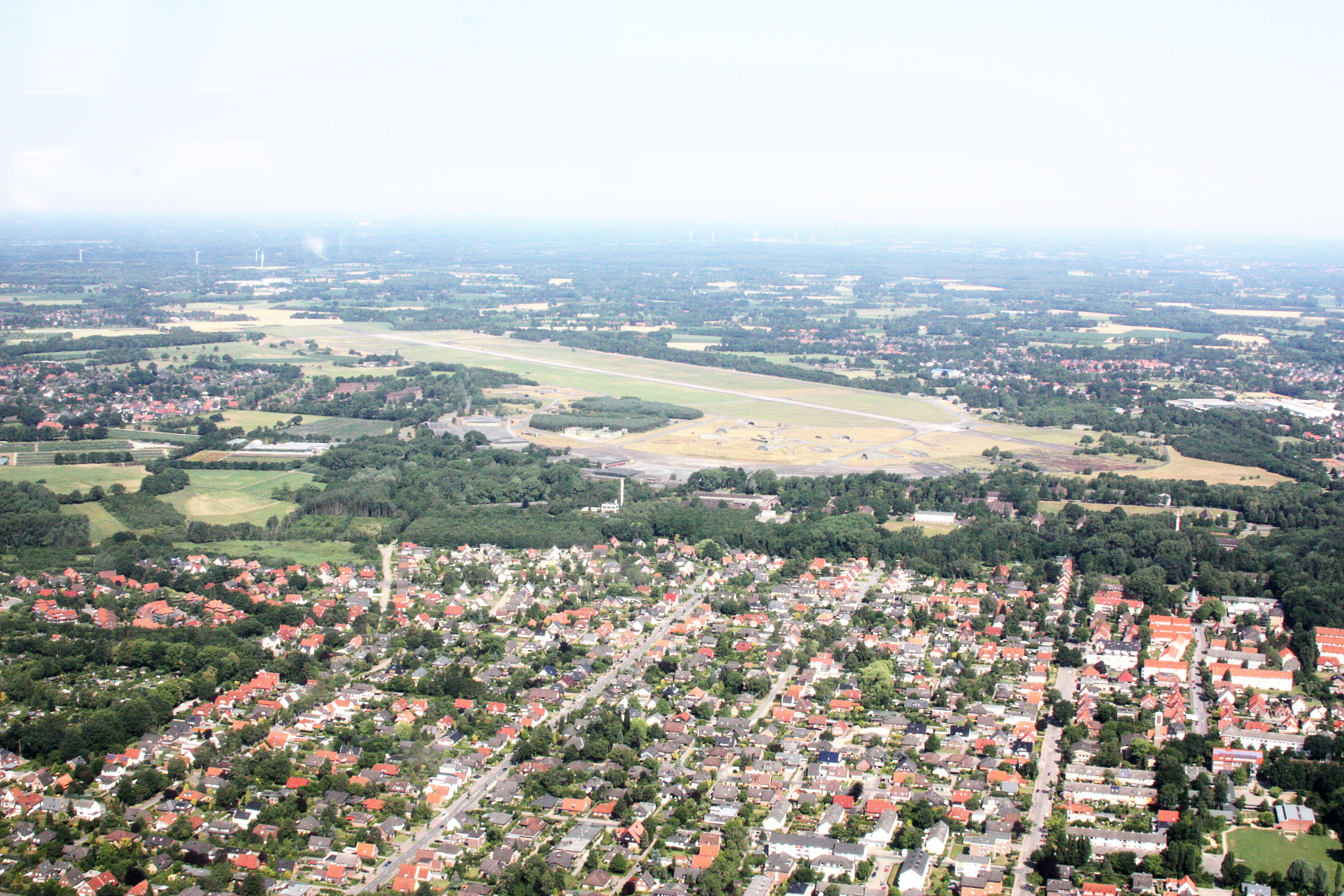
Aerial photographs of Oldenburg at an altitude of 1,500 feet, July 2010.

Oldenburg Air Base is a former West German Luftwaffe air base in Lower Saxony, Germany. During the Cold War it was used by the British Royal Air Force (RAF) as part of Royal Air Force Germany until 1957.

== Royal Air Force history ==
The following units were here 1952-59:

- No. 14 Squadron RAF between 23 June 1955 and 26 September 1959 when the squadron moved to RAF Ahlhorn. Operated Hawker Hunter F.4 & F.6's
- No. 20 Squadron RAF from 28 July 1952 until 23 September 1957. The squadron operated a variety of aircraft including de Havilland Vampire FB.5 & FB.9s, Canadair Sabre F.4s & Hawker Hunter F.4 & F.6s
- No. 26 Squadron RAF from 12 August 1952 until 10 September 1957 when the squadron disbanded. The unit operated Sabre F.4s and Hunter F.4s
- No. 234 Squadron RAF reformed here on 1 August 1952 staying until 8 January 1954 when the squadron moved to RAF Geilenkirchen. The unit operated Vampire FB.5 & FB.9s and Sabre F.4s

== West German Luftwaffe ==
In 1964, the new post-war West German Luftwaffe's Reconnaissance Squadron 54 was disbanded, and at the same time Fighter Squadron 72 was moved back from Leck to Oldenburg. Both formations were merged to form Fighter-Bomber Geschwader 43 due to the change in the mission's mission (the aircraft were no longer day fighters, but the mission of the formation was now to combat ground targets). The association was subordinate to the 4th Air Force Division and the North American F-86 Sabre was flown. In 1966 it was converted to Fiat G.91, the following year it was renamed to Leichtes Kampfgeschwader 43, and in 1979 it was renamed back to Fighter Bomber Geschwader 43. From 1981 the Alpha Jet was flown in Oldenburg. In 1991, 18 Alpha Jets from 2nd Squadron were briefly deployed to Turkey due to the Gulf War. On September 30, 1993, JaboG 43 was decommissioned/dissolved; a year later, on November 1, 1994, the airfield was officially de-dedicated.

In addition to the flying unit, Air Force Supply Group 22 was stationed on the air base grounds from 1957 to 1958. In 1959 it was reorganized into Air Force Supply Regiment 6, whose staff moved into the Oldenburg Donnerschwee barracks. The Air Force Medical Squadron of LVR 6 (until 1993), the Saber F-86 field shipyard (until 1966), the Fiat G-91 field shipyard (from 1966 to 1981) and its successor Air Force Shipyard 61 of LVR 6 (from 1981 to 1993) were on the Stationed on the grounds of the air base.

From 1968 to 1991, the 3rd battery of the anti-aircraft missile battalion 24 of the Nike air defense force was stationed at the air base, and from 1993 to 2006 (relocation to Bad Sülze) the anti-aircraft missile group 24 of the anti-aircraft missile squadron 2.

The base was closed after Jagdbombergeschwader 43 was disbanded on 30 September 1993.
