= No. 15 Sector RAF =

No. 15 Sector RAF Reserve Army Wing 15th Corps Wing RFC No. 15 (Fighter) Wing RAF
- Active: 1916–1919; 1943–1944; 1944
- Country: United Kingdom
- Branch: Royal Flying Corps; Royal Air Force
- Type: Sector; Previously Wing

No. 15 Sector RAF is a former Royal Air Force Sector that was operational during both the First and Second World Wars. It was formed as a wing in 1916 and disbanded in 1919 before being re-established, again initially as a wing, in 1943.

== First World War ==
Reserve Army Wing was formed on 21 June 1916, it renamed to 15th Corps Wing RFC on 24 June 1916 it moved to Arqueves, Watvin, La Lovie, St. Andre-Aux-Bois, Proyart, Villers-Carbonnel, Daours, Drucat, Bertangles Town, Vaux-En-Amienois, Nicolas, Querrieu, Cartigny, Elincourt and finally to Germinnes Chateau where it disbanded on 20 March 1919.

It controlled various squadrons such as: 3, 4, 5, 6, 7, 8, 9, 12, 15, 21, 23, 32, 35, 52, 53, 57, 59, 73, 82, 101, 205 and 3rd Australian Flying Corps.

== Second World War ==
No. 15 (Fighter) Wing RAF was formed on 15 August 1943 at RAF Kingsnorth as part of No. 83 Group RAF. It controlled:

- No. 122 Airfield Headquarters RAF
- No. 125 Airfield Headquarters RAF
- No. 129 Airfield Headquarters RAF (from 20 April 1944)

On 5 October 1943, shortly after its formation, the wing moved to RAF Newchurch and then, on 10 October, to RAF Detling. On 15 April 1944 the wing moved to RAF Ford. The wing was disbanded on 12 May 1944.

No. 15 (Fighter) Sector was formed on 12 May 1944 at RAF Ford controlling:

- No. 125 Wing RAF
- No. 129 Wing RAF
- No. 144 Wing RAF

The sector moved to RAF Old Sarum on 13 June 1944, to Southampton on 21 June 1944, and finally to Martragny on 22 June 1944 where the sector was disbanded on 12 July 1944.

== See also ==
- List of wings of the Royal Air Force
