= Edward Crew (RAF officer) =

Edward Dixon Crew
- Born: 24 December 1917; Higham Ferrers, Northamptonshire
- Died: 18 August 2002 (aged 84); Cirencester, Gloucestershire
- Military career
- Allegiance: United Kingdom
- Branch: Royal Air Force
- Service years: 1939–1973
- Rank: Air Vice Marshal
- Service number: 74700
- Commands: Central Reconnaissance Establishment (1968–69); Air Forces Borneo (1965–66); RAF Bruggen (1959–62); No. 45 Squadron (1948–50); No. 96 Squadron (1943–44)
- Conflicts: Second World War: Battle of France; Battle of Britain; Malayan Emergency; Indonesia–Malaysia confrontation
- Awards: Companion of the Order of the Bath; Distinguished Service Order & Bar; Distinguished Flying Cross & Bar; Mentioned in Despatches

Air Vice Marshal Edward Dixon Crew, CB, DSO & Bar, DFC & Bar (24 December 1917 – 18 August 2002) was a Royal Air Force officer and a nightfighter ace of the Second World War. He shot down 15 enemy aircraft and was one of the top-scoring aces against the V-1 flying bomb.

== Early life ==
Edward Dixon Crew was born 24 December 1917 in a house on the Market Square, Higham Ferrers and was educated at Felsted School and Downing College, Cambridge. While at Downing College he joined the University Air Squadron and following his graduation he was commissioned in the Royal Air Force Volunteer Reserve.

== Second world war ==
In July 1940 Crew joined No. 604 Squadron RAF operating twin-engined Blenheim IF night-fighters. During the Battle of France the squadron was used for day and night operations against Germany troops and patrols over the Dunkirk beaches to protect the withdrawal of the British Expeditionary Force. With the Battle of Britain at its height the squadron aircraft were fitted with airborne radar, although the system was immature and the Blenheim was not the best night fighter. Later in 1940 the squadron was re-equipped with the Bristol Beaufighter and Crew downed his first Germany aircraft, a Heinkel He 111, on 4 April 1941. With two more aircraft shot down and two damaged he was awarded the Distinguished Flying Cross in June 1941. In June 1942 he had destroyed five aircraft to become an ace and in June 1942 he received a Bar to his Distinguished Flying Cross.

Crew joined No. 85 Squadron RAF as a flight commander, the squadron operated the radar-equipped twin-engined De Havilland Mosquito. As the number of victories increased Crew was appointed commanding officer of No. 96 Squadron RAF at first with Beaufighters but these were later exchanged for Mosquitos. Between June and September 1944 the squadron had downed 181 V-1 flying bombs and Crew was awarded the Distinguished Service Order for his leadership.

During the Second World War Crew downed 15 enemy aircraft and 31½ V-1s. He was the fourth highest scorer against the flying bomb and the most effective Mosquito pilot; the top three scorers all flew the single-engined Hawker Tempest.

== Post-war ==
From 1948 to 1950 Crew commanded No. 45 Squadron RAF based in Malaya and operating anti-insurgency operations with the Bristol Beaufighter during the Malayan Emergency, he was awarded a Bar to his Distinguished Service Order for his leadership.

Crew was seconded to the Royal Canadian Air Force in 1952 and at North Bay Ontario commanded Number 3 All Weather Operational Training Unit using among others the Avro Canada CF-100 Canuck. Back in the United Kingdom he flight tested the Gloster Javelin delta-wing fighter at the Central Fighter Establishment. From 1959 to 1962 he was station commander at RAF Bruggen part of the 2nd Tactical Air Force based in Germany. From 1965 to 1966 he was commander of the Air Forces in Borneo at the time of the Indonesian confrontation with Malaya.

Crew held a number of senior staff appointments at the Ministry of Defence until 1973 when he retired. He was appointed a Companion of the Order of the Bath that year.

== Later life ==
Crew worked in the Planning Inspectorate at the Department of the Environment for the next 14 years using his knowledge of airfields. After serving local government as a member of the Cotswold District Council he finally retired in 1996.

Crew had married Virginia in 1945 and when he died on 18 August 2002 he was survived by her and a son.

== Honours and awards ==
- 29 July 1941 – Flying Officer Edward Dixon Crew (74700), Royal Air Force Volunteer Reserve, No. 604 Squadron has been awarded the Distinguished Flying Cross for gallantry displayed in flying operations against the enemy:

This officer is a pilot of outstanding ability who has shown tenacity of purpose to engage the enemy which culminated in the destruction of two enemy aircraft in one night. He has now destroyed four and damaged at least a further four enemy aircraft at night.

— London Gazette

- 16 June 1942 – Flight Lieutenant Edward Dixon Crew, DFC, (74700), Royal Air Force Volunteer Reserve, No. 604 Squadron is awarded a Bar to the Distinguished Flying Cross:

Since the award of the Distinguished Flying Cross in July 1941, this officer has carried out a large number of operational patrols by night and has destroyed 4 enemy aircraft. He has now destroyed a total of 8 enemy aircraft at night and damaged a number of others. By his readiness to fly in any weather and his skill and ability in dealing with the enemy at night, he sets a splendid example to the squadron

— London Gazette

- 26 September 1944 – Acting Wing Commander Edward Dixon Crew, DFC (74700) RAFVR, 96 Squadron is awarded the Distinguished Service Order for gallantry displayed in flying operations against the enemy:

Wing Commander Crew continues to display the highest standard of skill, courage and leadership. In air fighting he has destroyed 13 enemy aircraft and damaged several more. With the advent of the flying bomb attacks on this country Wing Commander Crew displayed great skill and perseverance in devising tactics to meet the menace. As a result, he shot down numerous flying bombs, whilst other members of this squadron took a heavy toll of them. This officer has commanded his squadron with outstanding success.

— London Gazette

- 10 March 1950 – Squadron Leader Edward Dixon Crew, DSO, DFC (74700) Royal Air Force is awarded a Bar to the Distinguished Service Order for distinguished service in Malaya.
- 1 January 1973 – Air Vice Marshal Edward Dixon Crew, DSO, DFC, Royal Air Force is appointed a Companion of the Order of the Bath in the 1973 New Year Honours.
