= No. 256 Squadron RAF =

Former flying squadron of the Royal Air Force

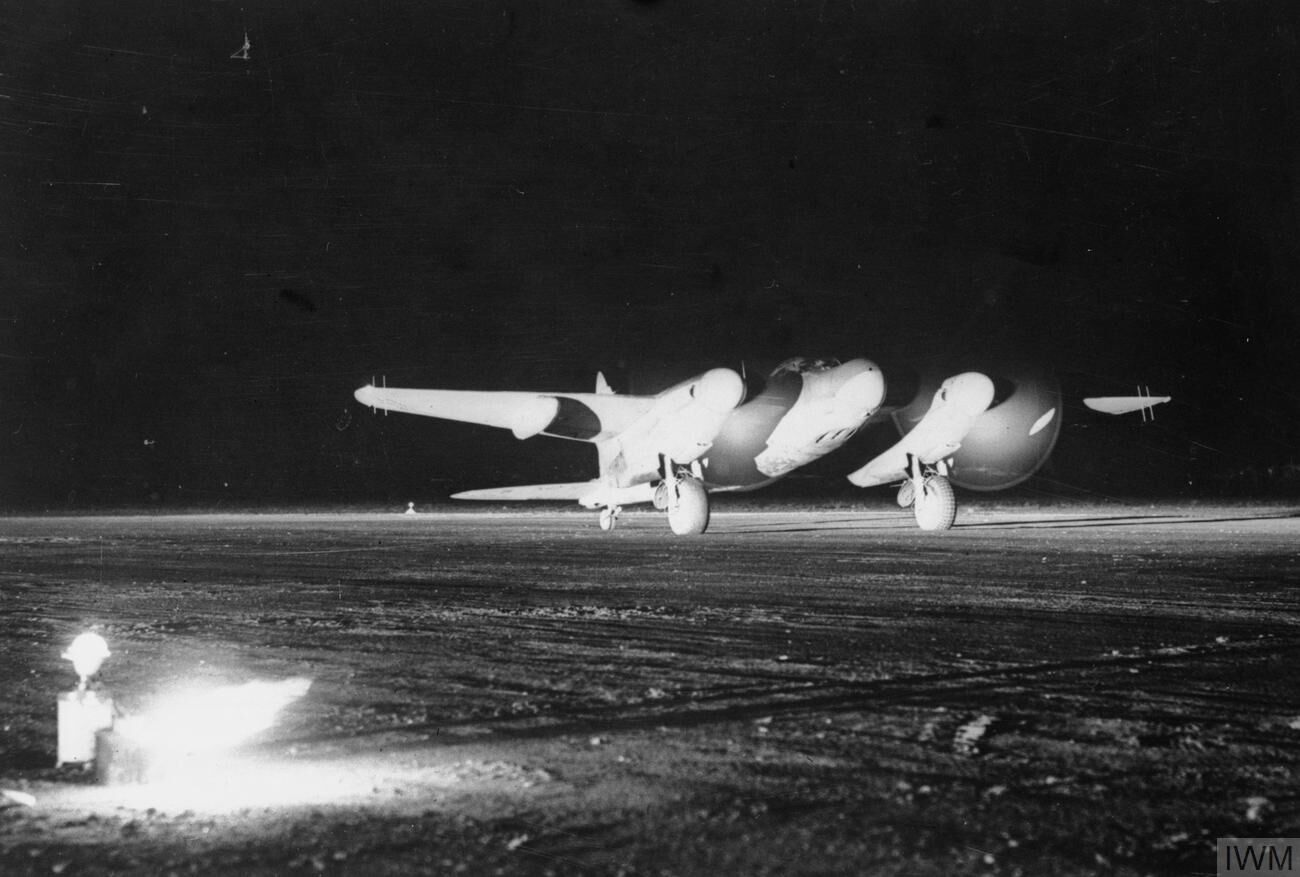
- De Havilland Mosquito at night takeoff at Foggia, Italy
- Active: 1 June 1918 – 30 June 1919; 23 November 1940 – 12 September 1946; 17 November 1952 – 21 January 1959
- Country: United Kingdom
- Branch: Royal Air Force
- Motto(s): Addimus vim viribus Latin: (we add) strength to strength

Insignia
- Squadron badge heraldry: In front of an Anchor Azure a Ferret’s head erased Argent
- Squadron code (1939): SZ
- Squadron code (1940 – 1946): JT

No. 256 Squadron RAF was a flying squadron of the Royal Air Force which operated during the First and Second World Wars. Initially equipped with Dh6 and Kangaroo aircraft, it operated Defiant Mk IIs, Beaufighters, and Mosquitoes in the Second World War.

In the 1950s it was equipped with the Meteor NF11 Night/All Weather Fighter and was assigned to No 125 Wing, RAF. Based in Germany as part of the 2nd Tactical Air Force, it initially flew from RAF Ahlhorn in north Germany until that airfield was handed back to the German Air Force in 1958, after which the wing was re-located at RAF Geilenkirchen near Aachen.

== First World War ==
The squadron was formed in June 1918 at RAF Elford (later RAF Seahouses), flying Dh6 aircraft. It parented No.s 495 (Light Bomber), 525, 526, 527 and 528 Special Duty Flights. The various flights were engaged in coastal patrols and outbased at other locations such as RAF Ashington, New Haggerston, Rennington, and Cairncross.

A cadre of Kangaroos was detached to the airfield at Killingholme at the end of January 1919, but five months later, the whole squadron was disbanded.

== Second World War ==
The squadron reformed at RAF Catterick as night-fighter unit, in November 1940, flying the Boulton Paul Defiant. It moved to RAF Pembrey in January 1941, but didn't stay long and the squadron moved to RAF Colerne in February 1941, and then a month later moving to RAF Squires Gate. In June 1942, the squadron relocated to RAF Woodvale and converted from the Defiant to Beaufighters. The squadron relocated to RAF Ford in Sussex in April 1943 and re-equipped with Mosquito NF.xii aircraft before returning to RAF Woodvale in August 1943.

In September 1943, the squadron was moved to RAF Luqa in Malta for night-defence and convoy escort duties. In April 1944, most of the squadron moved to La Senia Airfield in Algeria, whilst a month later in May 1944, the squadron absorbed the Spitfires of the Gibraltar Defence Flight (formerly No. 1676 Flight), which became 'C' Flight within the squadron. During this time, the squadron ran intruder operations into Italy, eventually relocating to Foggia to enable these flights to be extended into the Balkans. Arriving at Foggia in September 1944, the squadron moved again to Forlì in February 1945 and at the end of the war, the squadron was at El Ballah in Egypt.

== Post war ==
The squadron moved to RAF Nicosia in July 1946 and disbanded there in September of the same year. The squadron was reformed with Gloster Meteor aircraft in November 1952 at RAF Ahlhorn in north western Germany; at this time it was assigned to No 125 Wing, RAF and formed part of the 2nd Tactical Air Force. The squadron moved to RAF Geilenkirchen in January 1958, and was renumbered to No. 11 Squadron a year later whilst still operating from Geilenkirchen.

== Squadron badge ==
The badge for No. 256 Squadron was approved in 1948 and showed a ferret looking to the right in front of a blue anchor. The anchor relates to the coastal and convoy patrols in the First World War and the ferret represented the intruder operations in the Second World War. The squadron's motto was Addimus vim viribus, Latin for (we add) strength to strength.
