= Canadair Sabre =

Canadian licensed built F-86 Sabre

CL-13 Sabre
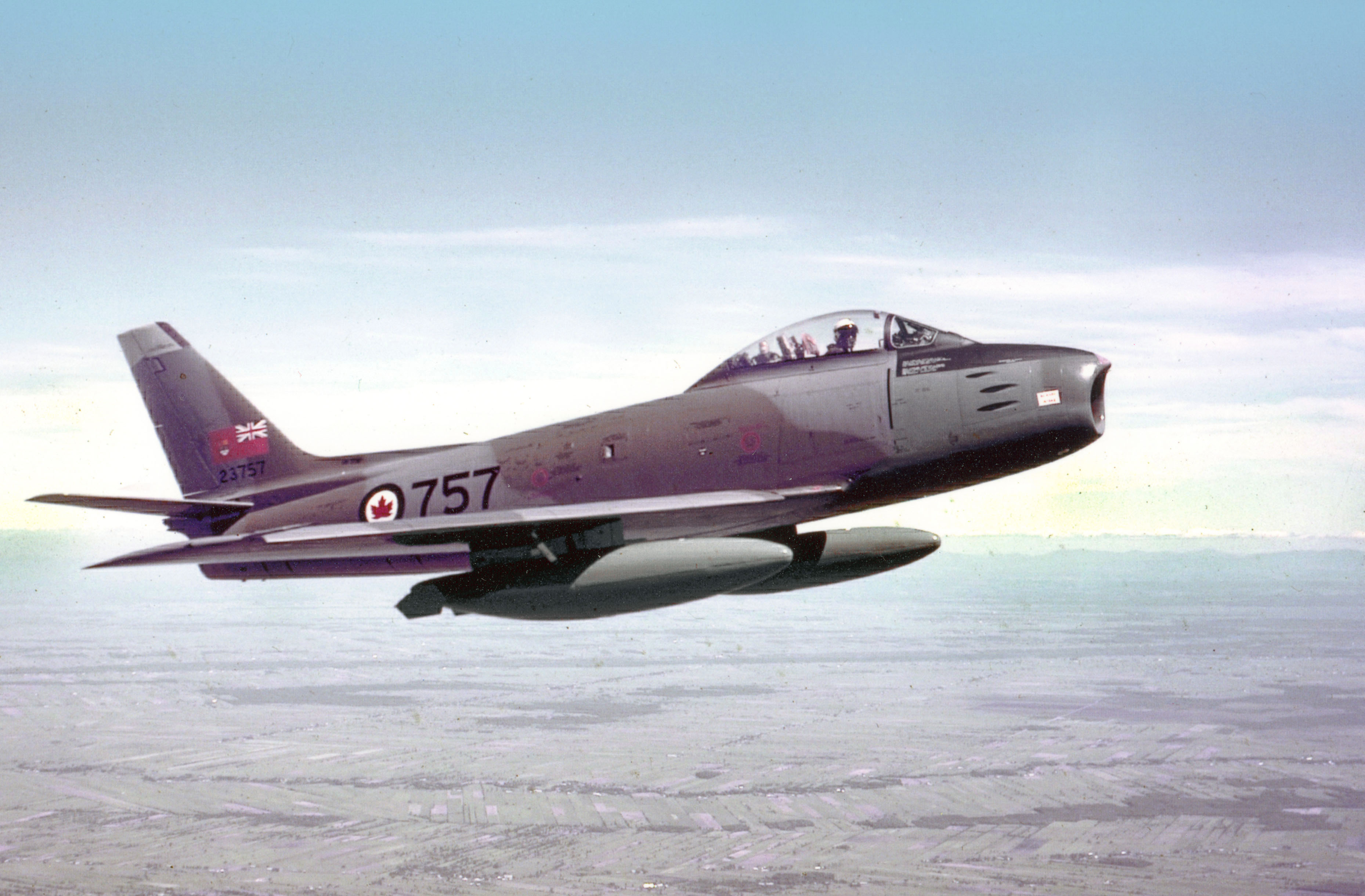
- An RCAF Canadair Sabre. Camouflage colouring was used on Europe-based aircraft.

General information
- Type: Fighter
- National origin: Canada
- Manufacturer: Canadair
- Primary users: Royal Canadian Air Force United States Air Force; Royal Air Force; German Air Force
- Number built: 1,815

History
- Manufactured: 1950–1958
- Introduction date: 1950
- First flight: 9 August 1950
- Retired: 1980, Pakistan
- Developed from: North American F-86 Sabre

The Canadair Sabre is a jet fighter aircraft built by Canadair under licence from North American Aviation. A variant of the North American F-86 Sabre, it was produced until 1958 and used primarily by the Royal Canadian Air Force (RCAF) until replaced with the Canadair CF-104 in 1962. Several other air forces also operated the aircraft.

The aircraft was produced in two significant batches. The first, the Mk. 2 and Mk. 4s, with fewer than 1,000 produced, were only slightly different from their US counterparts. The second run, the Mk. 5s and Mk. 6s of similar numbers, were patterned on the later versions of the US Sabre with larger wings for improved maneuverability while replacing the original General Electric J47 engine with the more-powerful Avro Canada Orenda.

The last of the Canadair Sabres in front-line operation were in Pakistan, whose AIM-9 Sidewinder-equipped Mk. 6 models were the backbone of their air force during the Indo-Pakistani War of 1971. These were slowly phased out after 1971, with the last examples leaving combat service in 1980. Although replaced by higher-performance designs in most other forces by the 1960s, late-model versions served in secondary roles into the 1970s.

One example that became famous was the single Mk. 3, the test-bed for the Orenda engine, which Jacqueline Cochran used in 1953 to set several speed records, including becoming the first woman to break the sound barrier. Another, an ex-RCAF Mk. 6 that left service in 1974, went on to become Boeing's chase plane for test flights until 1991. Many of these later aircraft are now preserved in museums.

== Design and development ==
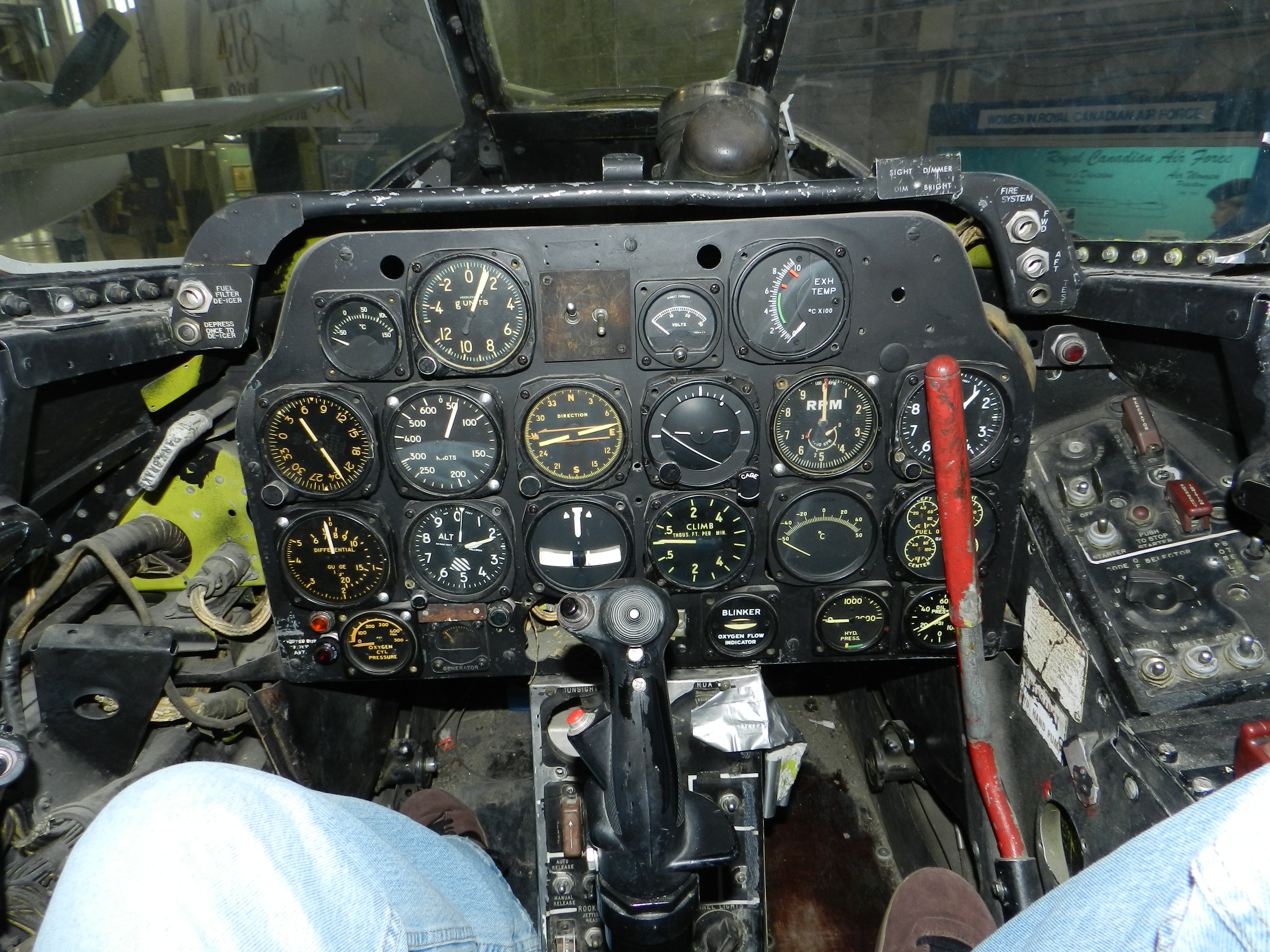
Cockpit and instrument panel of the Sabre

In 1948, the Canadian government decided to re-equip the RCAF with the F-86 Sabre with Canadair contracted to produce them in Montreal, Quebec, Canada. An initial batch of 10 aircraft was ordered for tool verification. The Korean War changed this to a production batch of 100 aircraft. Canadair slowly built up its production facility to make all components with related equipment obtained from other Canadian suppliers. Canadair gave the Sabre the project number CL-13.

Canadair produced six versions of the CL-13 Sabre. The sole Sabre Mk.1 was essentially the same as the North American Sabre F-86A. It had a General Electric J47-GE-13 turbojet of 5,200 lbf (23 kN) thrust. The Sabre Mk.2 had the same engine, although after the first 20 aircraft were produced, the remainder of the production run was distinguished in having power-assisted controls and an "all-flying" tailplane. The sole Sabre Mk.3 was the first of the Canadian Sabres to use the Avro Canada Orenda turbojet (Orenda 3 with 6,000 lbf (27 kN) thrust). The Sabre Mk.4 retained the General Electric engine, was destined for the RAF and was later passed on to other overseas air forces. The Sabre Mk.5 was the next production version, equipped with an Orenda 10 with 6,500 lbf (29 kN) thrust. A change to the Orenda 14 with 7,440 lbf (33.1 kN) powered the Sabre Mk.6.

The last Sabre to be manufactured by Canadair (Sabre No. 1815), after being donated by the Pakistan Air Force, is now part of the permanent collection in the Western Canada Aviation Museum (WCAM) in Winnipeg, Manitoba. From 1950 to 1958, a total of 1,815 CL-13 Sabres were built at the Canadair plant in Montreal.

== Operational history ==
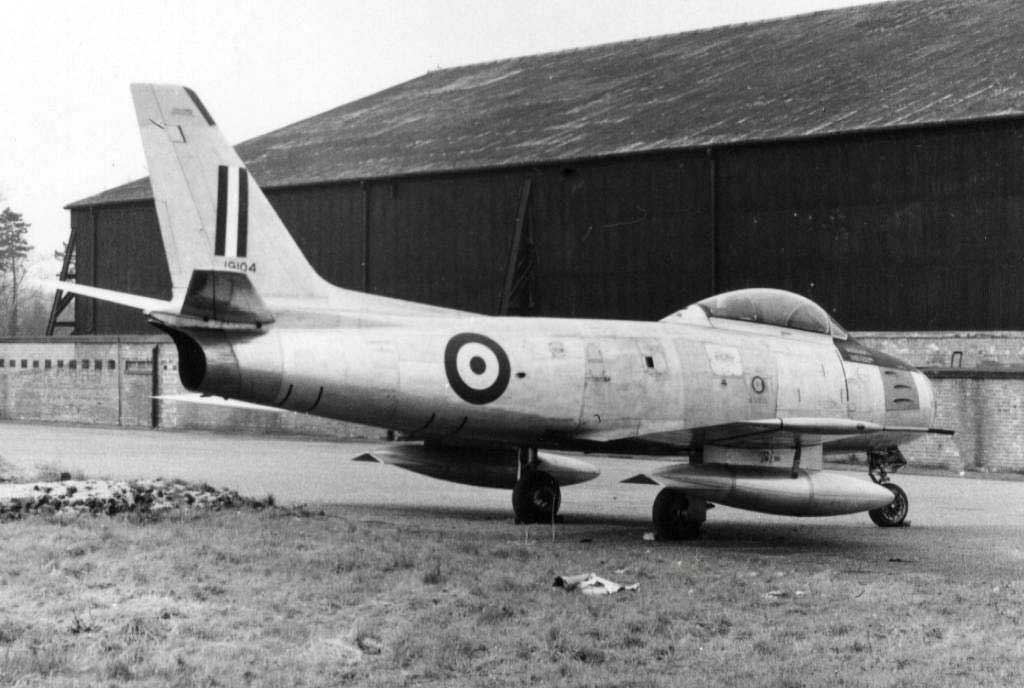
Canadair Sabre 2 in Greek Air Force markings in 1955

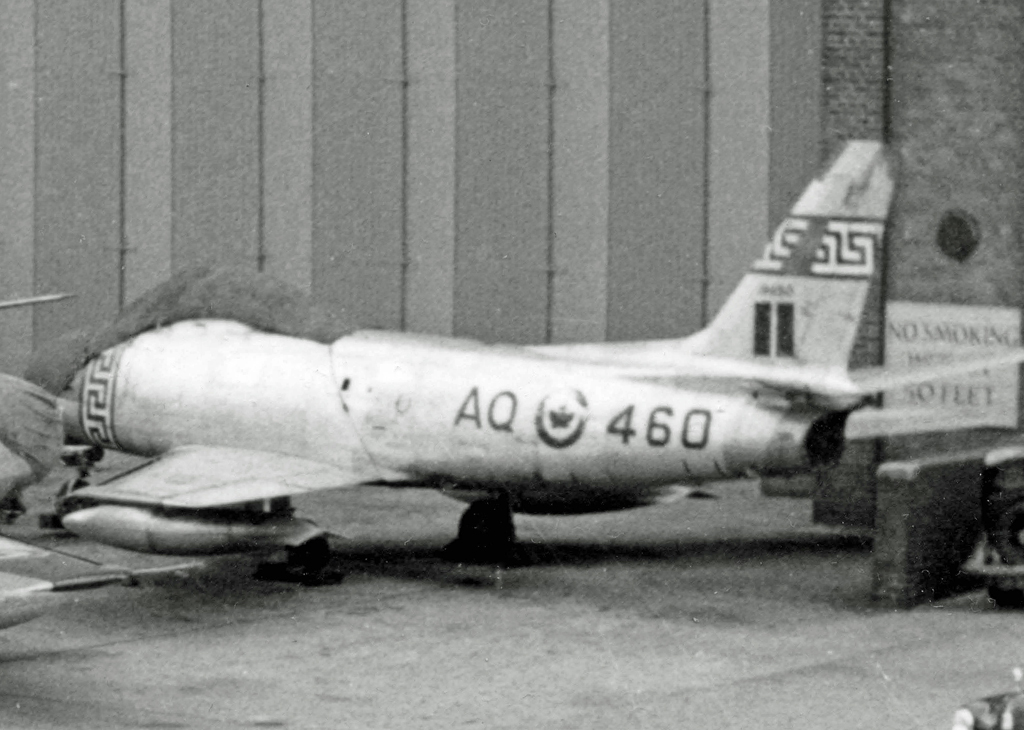
Canadair Sabre 4 of 414 Squadron RCAF in 1954

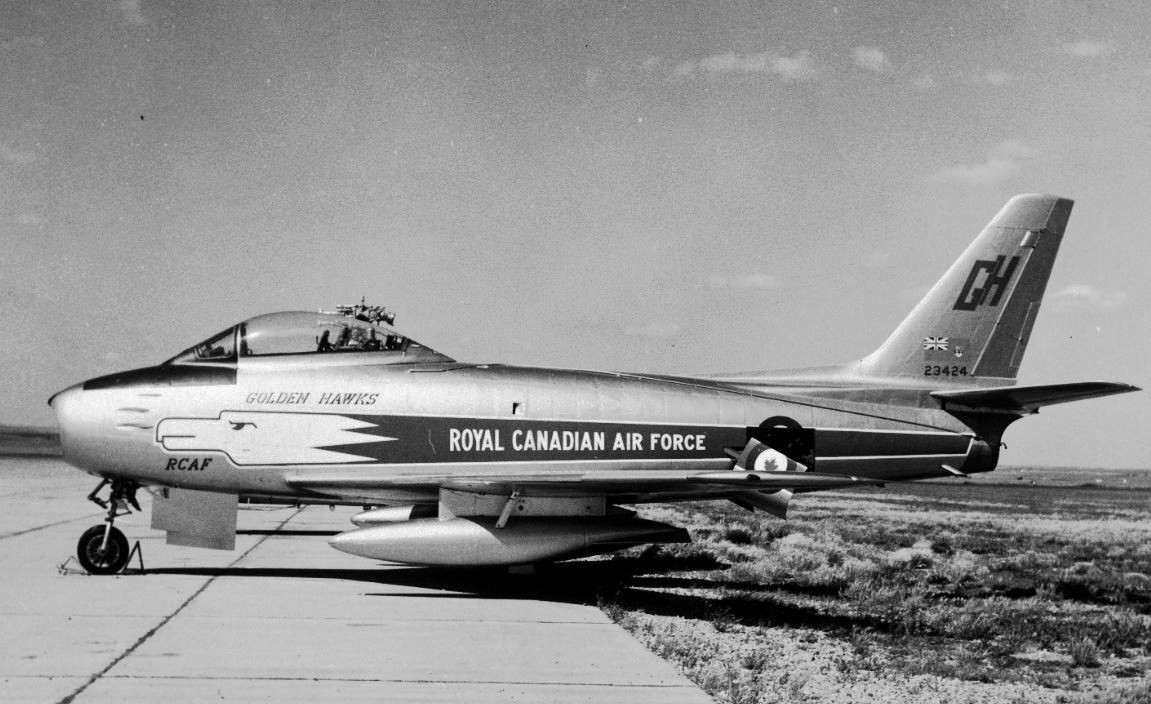
Ex-RCAF Golden Hawk Canadair F-86 23424 purchased by Lynn Garrison for his collection, July 1964

The second generation of Canadair Sabre aircraft, and first to be built in quantity, was the Mk.2, with 350 produced from 1952 to 1953. The RCAF received 290 of these improved aircraft. During the first half of 1952, the remaining 60 Mk.2s were supplied to the U.S. Air Force for use in the Korean War. Most RCAF Mk.2 Sabres were utilized in the air defence role with NATO's No. 1 Air Division in Europe, proving itself to be an outstanding dogfighter. Others were assigned to the training role at bases in Canada. After replacement by the Sabre 5 in RCAF service from 1954, just over 210 surviving Sabre 2s were overhauled and modified in the UK and supplied in roughly equal numbers to the Greek Air Force and Turkish Air Forces.

In mid-1952, the Sabre Mk.4 went into production with the first one flown on 28 August 1952. Apart from some minor structural and systems changes, including improved air-conditioning and gun sight, the Mk 2 and the Mk 4 were identical. Of 438 Mk 4s built, approximately 70 were used temporarily by the RCAF, all surviving examples being passed to the RAF. The other Sabre 4s went directly to the RAF under a mutual aid program, equipping 11 RAF squadrons. The majority served in West Germany with NATO, with two squadrons being based in the UK as part of RAF Fighter Command. The Sabre Mk.4 served with the RAF until mid-1956 when they were replaced by Hawker Hunters. The survivors were overhauled in the UK, fitted with '6-3' wing modifications and handed to the USAF (which had funded these aircraft) which in turn passed them on to other NATO members, with the majority going to Italy and Yugoslavia.

On 30 July 1953, the first Sabre Mk.5 flew with the Orenda 10 engine, which gave it a clear rate of climb and ceiling advantage over earlier variants. Other Mk 5 improvements included a new oxygen system and improved maneuverability and low-speed characteristics achieved by increasing the wing chord by six in (15.2 cm) at the root and three in. (7.2 cm) at the wing tip along with fitting a small vertical wing fence. This modification, originated by North American on the F-86F, dramatically improved maneuverability, though the loss of the slatted leading edge increased landing speed and degraded low speed handling considerably. Canadair built 370 Mk 5s with the majority designated for use in the RCAF's Air Division squadrons in Europe to replace the Mk.2s. A total of 75 RCAF Sabre 5s were transferred to the German Luftwaffe during 1957.

The Canadair Sabre Mk.6 was the final variant and was considered to be the best production Sabre ever built. It was equipped with a two-stage Orenda engine developing 7,275 pounds (3,300 kg)) of static thrust. Its altitude performance and climb rate was enhanced over the Mk 5 and the reinstatement of the wing leading edge slat gave it excellent low-speed characteristics. The first production model was completed on 2 November 1954 and ultimately 655 were built with production terminating on 9 October 1958.

A total of 390 Mk.6s went to the RCAF with the majority replacing the existing Canadair Sabre Mk.5s at the Air Division squadrons in West Germany and France. The main air threats to NATO in the 1950s in Central Europe were the early variants of the Soviet MiG- the MiG-15, MiG-17, MiG-19 and MiG-21. Based on the Korean War experience, the selection of the Mk.6 Sabre to provide an effective opposition to the MiG threat proved to be a logical one. Canada's commitment to NATO was to provide 12 squadrons located at four bases – two in France (Marville and Grostenquin) and two in West Germany (Zweibrücken and Baden Soellingen). Initially, the contribution consisted of only Sabre aircraft; however, later it was decided to include the Avro Canada CF-100 aircraft in the defense package to provide a night and all-weather fighter capability.

Though the main use of the Sabre by the RCAF was in Europe, they were also used by RCAF Auxiliary part-time units in Canada, replacing de Havilland Vampire jets. 400 "City Of Toronto" and 411 "County Of York" Squadrons based at RCAF Station Downsview near Toronto, as well as 401 "City Of Westmount" and 438 "City Of Montreal" Squadrons at RCAF Station St-Hubert near Montreal, were equipped with Sabre 5s, as was 442 "City Of Vancouver" Squadron at RCAF Station Sea Island, near Vancouver.

In addition to the RCAF deliveries, 225 Canadair Mk.6 Sabres were exported to the West German Luftwaffe, six were delivered to the Colombian Air Force, and 34 went to the South African Air Force.

In January 1966, Germany sold 90 of its Canadian Mk 6 Sabres to Iran. These aircraft were quickly transferred to Pakistan and became the main day fighter of the Pakistan Air Force.

Canadair Sabres were the mainstay of their respective air forces in the two major conflicts in which they were employed: the Korean War, where F-86 Sabres racked up a 6-1 kill record, and the Indo-Pakistani War of 1971. The diminutive Folland Gnat was its main opponent in the Indo-Pakistan war. By the end of 1971, the Gnat proved to be a frustrating opponent for the larger, heavier and older Sabre. The Gnat was referred to as a "Sabre Slayer" by the Indian Air Force since most of its combat kills during the two wars were against Sabres. Although the Canadair Sabre Mk.6 was widely regarded as the best dogfighter of its era, tactics called for Gnats taking on the Sabres in the vertical arena, where the Sabres were at a disadvantage. Moreover, because the Gnat was lightweight and compact in shape, it was hard to see, especially at the low levels where most of the dogfights took place.

=== Women's speed records ===
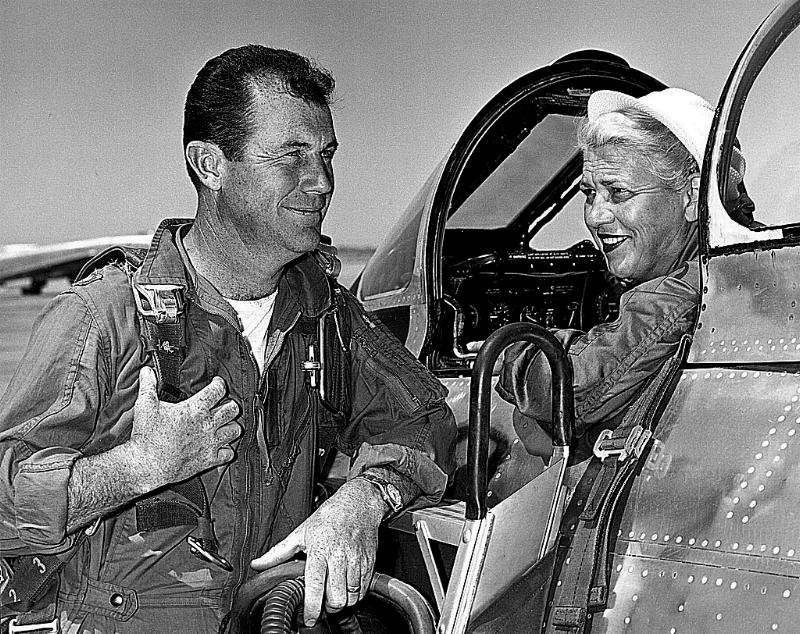
Cochran in her record-setting Sabre, talking with Chuck Yeager

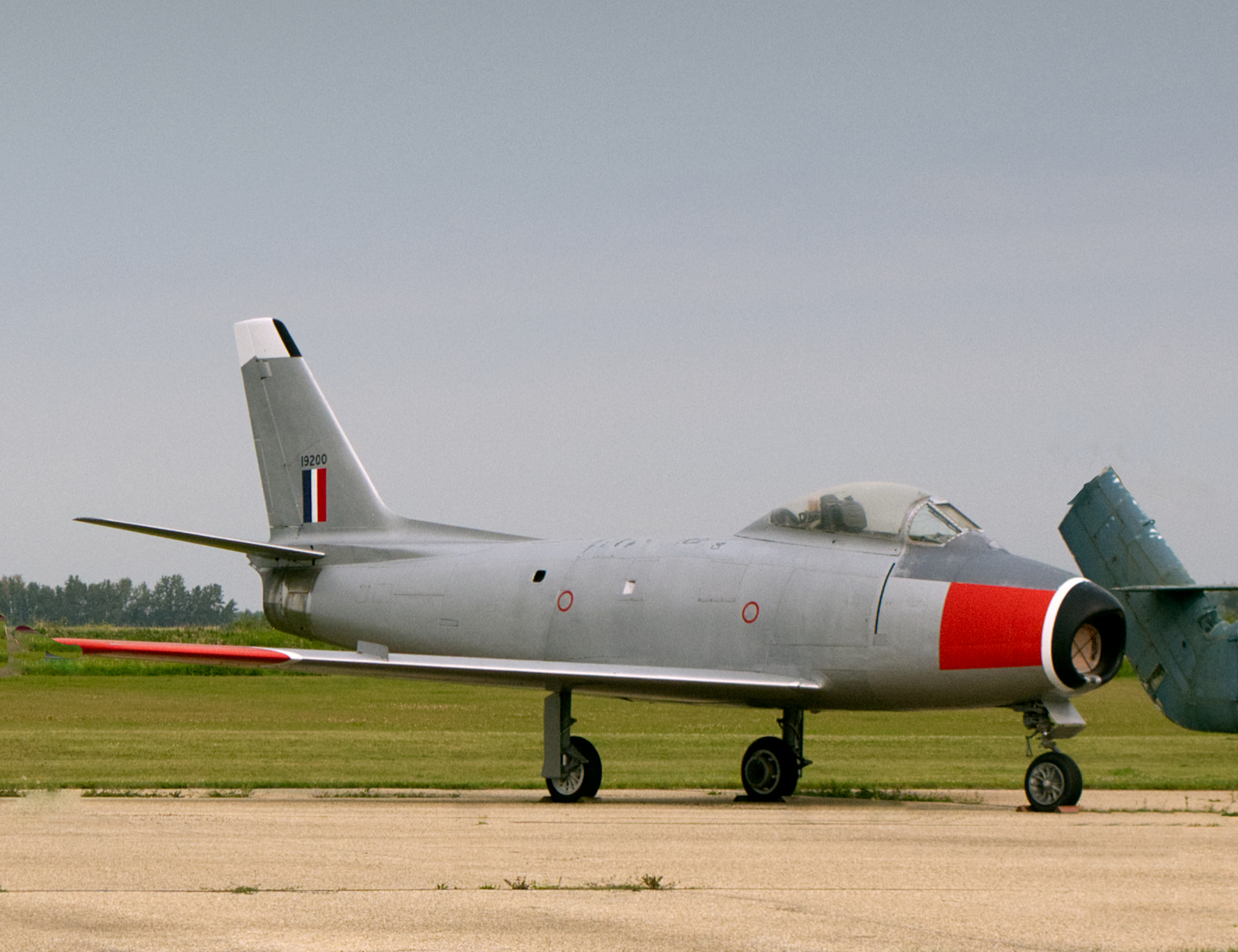
Canadair Sabre 19200

In 1952, Jacqueline Cochran, then aged 47, decided to challenge the world speed record for women, then held by Jacqueline Auriol. She tried to borrow an F-86 from the U.S. Air Force, but was refused. She was introduced to an Air Vice-Marshal of the RCAF who, with the permission of the Canadian Minister of Defence, arranged for her to borrow 19200, the sole Sabre 3. Canadair sent a 16-man support team to California for the attempt. On 18 May 1953, Ms. Cochran set a new 100 km speed record of 1,050.15 km/h (652.53 mph). Later on 3 June, she set a new 15 km closed circuit record of 1,078 km/h (670 mph). While she was in California, she exceeded 1270 km/h in a dive, and thus became the first woman to exceed the speed of sound.

=== Golden Hawks ===
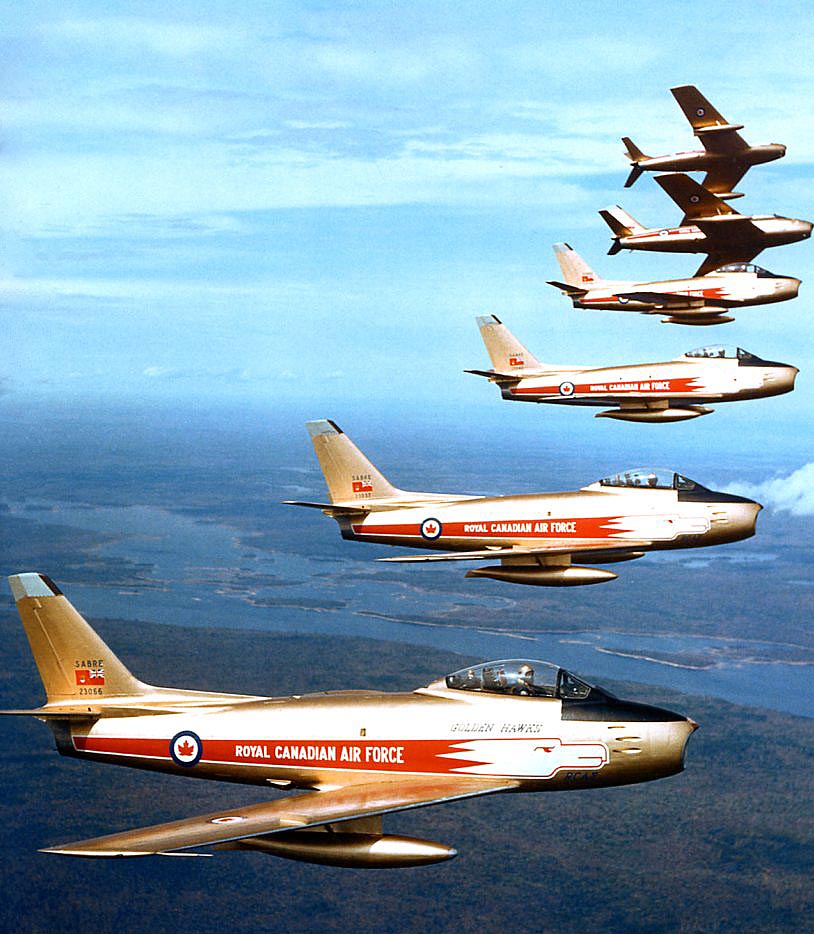
Golden Hawks flying team, 1959

The Golden Hawks were a Canadian aerobatic flying team that was established in 1959 to celebrate the Royal Canadian Air Force's 35th anniversary and the "Golden" 50th anniversary of Canadian flight, which began with the AEA Silver Dart in 1909. Initially, a six-plane team flying brilliantly painted metallic-gold Canadair Sabre Mk.5s, was envisioned as performing for only one year, but the Golden Hawks were so popular after their single 63-show season that the team was expanded. In the following year, another plane was added to the team, allowing for a five-plane main formation with two solo jets. The Golden Hawks continued performing for three more seasons, changing to the Mk 6 in 1961, until they were disbanded on 7 February 1964, having flown a total of 317 shows across North America.

== Variants ==
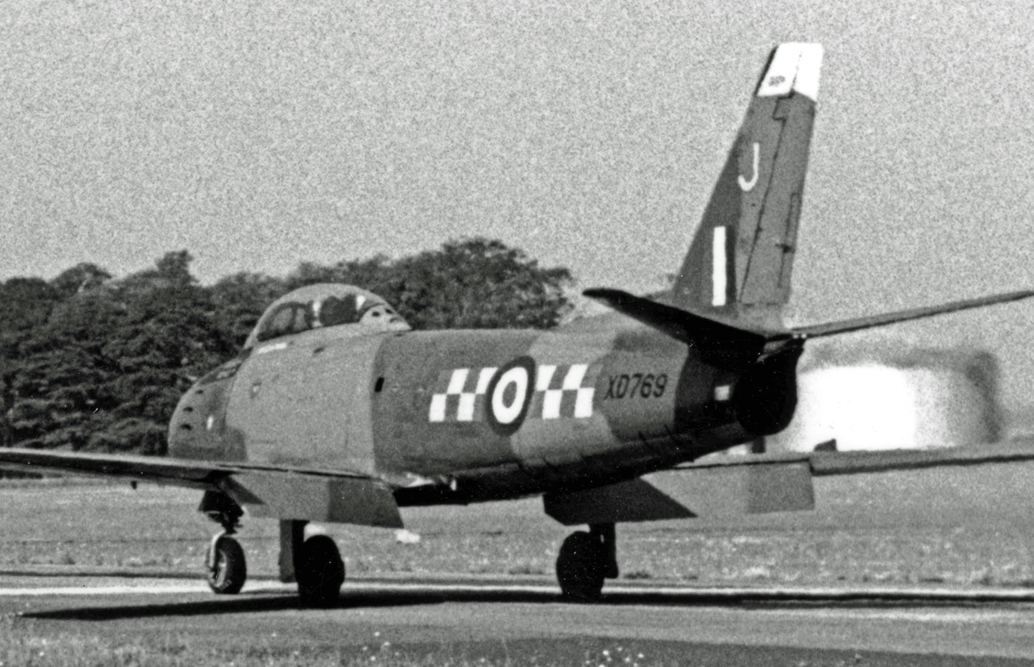
Canadair Sabre F.4 of 92 Squadron RAF Fighter Command in 1955

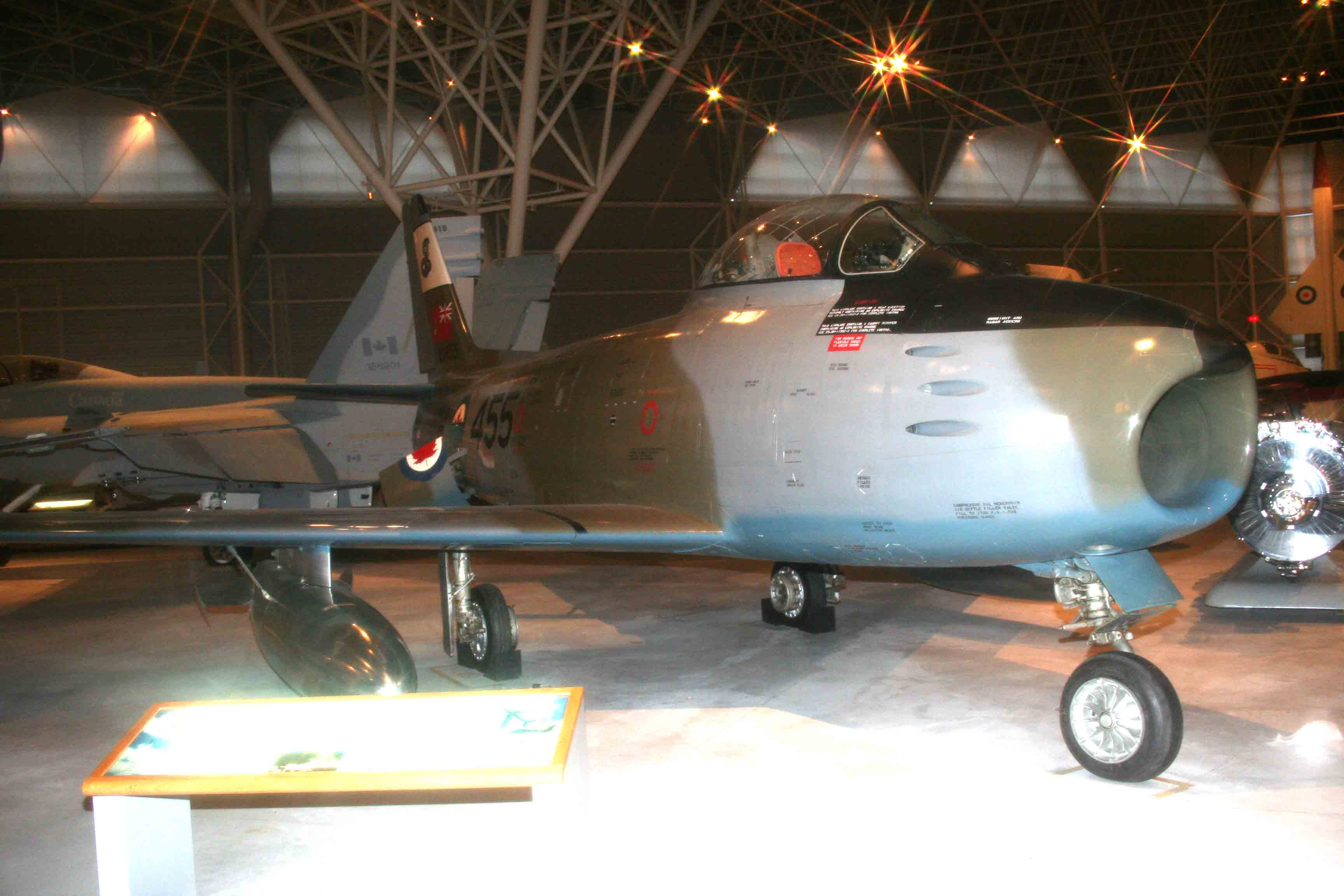
Preserved Canadair Sabre 6

Sabre Mk.1
One built, prototype based on F-86A-5 with 5,200 lbf (23,000 N) (static thrust) GE J47-GE-13 engine.
Sabre Mk.2
350 built, based on F-86E with all flying tailplane and with GE J47-GE-13 engine.

287 built for the RCAF, 60 for the USAF as the F-86E-6, and three to RAF, .

Sabre Mk.3
One built in Canada as a test-bed for the 6,000 lbf (27,000 N) (static thrust) Orenda 3 jet engine, with structural modifications to fit the larger diameter Orenda.
Sabre Mk.4
438 built with extensive detail modifications from Mk.2.

Ten built for the RCAF, and 428 to RAF as the Sabre F.4.

Sabre Mk.5
370 built with more powerful 6,355 lbf (28,270 N) (static thrust) Orenda 10 engine and "6-3" extended leading edges.

370 built for RCAF, from which 75 were later passed on to the German Air Force.

Sabre Mk.5A
Mk.5 in which radar and gunsights were replaced with ballast.
Sabre Mk.6
655 built with 7,275 lbf (32,360 N) Orenda 14 (static thrust).

390 built for the RCAF, 225 for the German Air Force, six to Colombia and 34 to South Africa.

== Operators ==
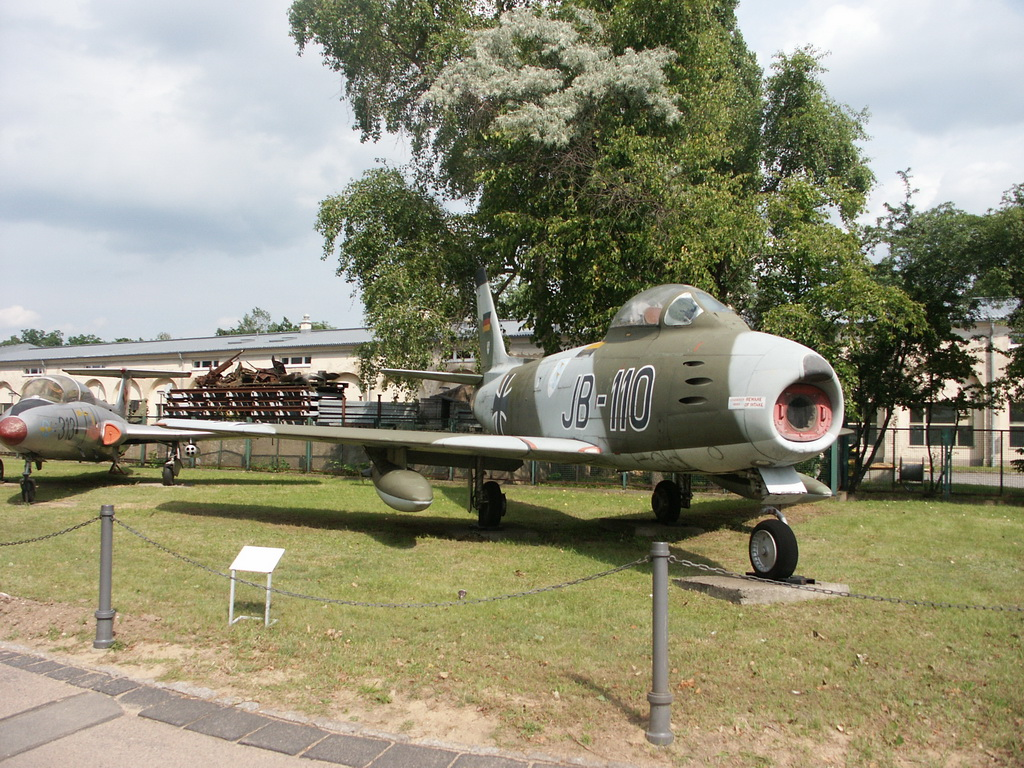
Luftwaffe Canadair Sabre

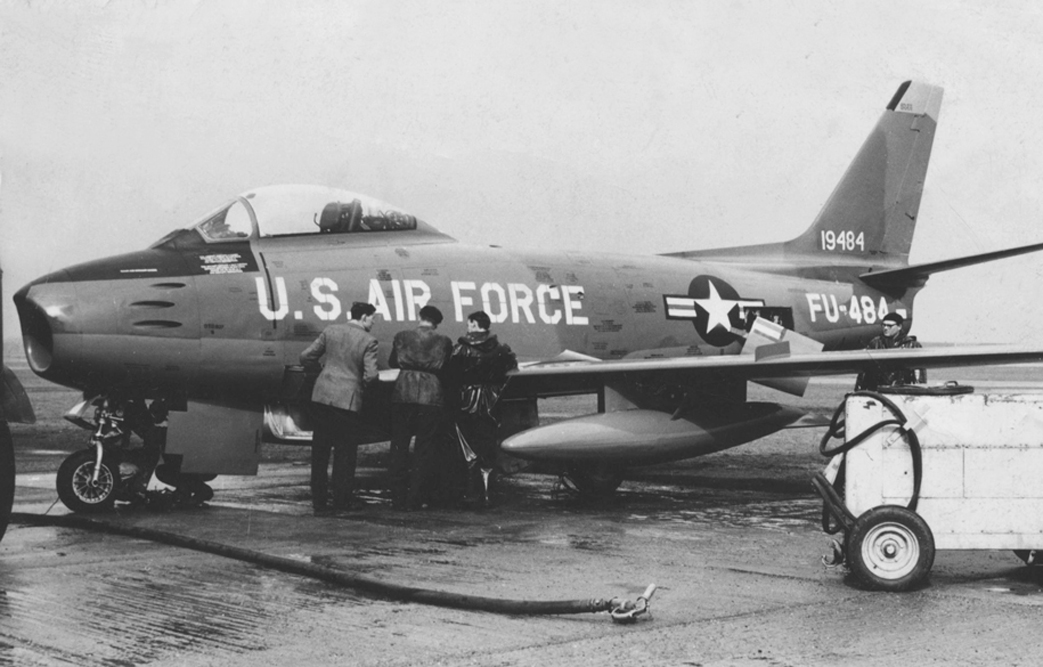
Ex RAF Canadair Sabre Mk 4 in United States Air Force markings before delivery to the Italian A.F. in 1956

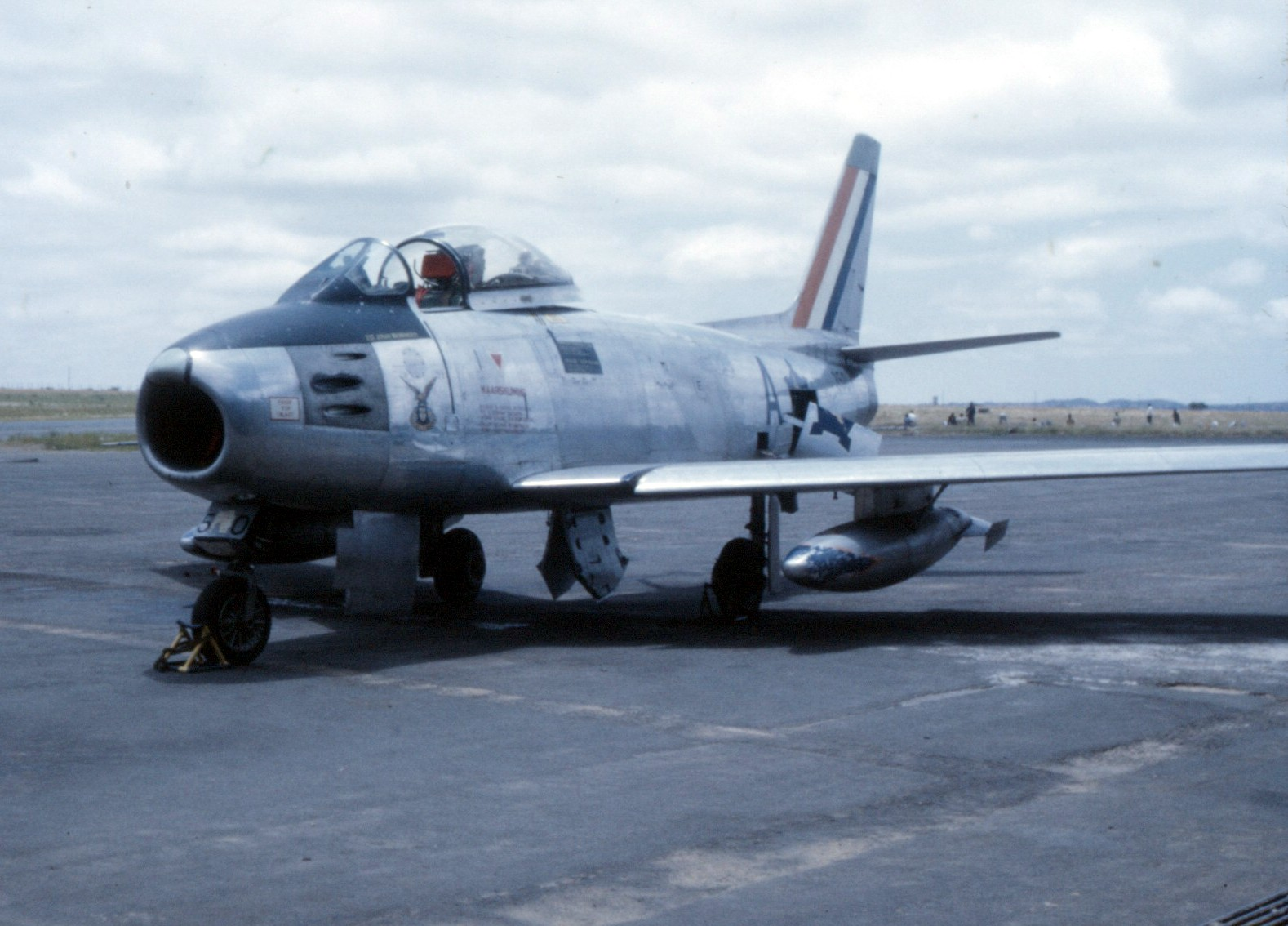
South African Canadair Sabre in 1970

Bangladesh

Canada

- Royal Canadian Air Force
  - No. 400 Squadron RCAF
  - No. 401 Squadron RCAF
  - No. 410 Squadron RCAF
  - No. 411 Squadron RCAF
  - No. 413 Squadron RCAF
  - No. 414 Squadron RCAF
  - No. 416 Squadron RCAF
  - No. 421 Squadron RCAF
  - No. 422 Squadron RCAF
  - No. 427 Squadron RCAF
  - No. 430 Squadron RCAF
  - No. 434 Squadron RCAF
  - No. 438 Squadron RCAF
  - No. 439 Squadron RCAF
  - No. 441 Squadron RCAF
  - No. 442 Squadron RCAF
  - No. 444 Squadron RCAF

Colombia

- Colombian Air Force

West Germany

- German Air Force - operated 75 Canadair Sabre Mk 5 and 225 Canadair Sabre Mk 6, 1957–1964, flown by JG 71, JG 72, and JG 73. The last Mk 6 used for training was retired in 1983.

Greece

- Royal Hellenic Air Force 120 used Canadair CL-13 Mk.4 acquired from Royal Canadian Air Force and redesignated as F-86E(M). Assigned to 341, 342, 343 Interceptor Squadrons (Μοίρες Αναχαιτίσεως) and retired in 1965.

Honduras

- Honduran Air Force Received 10 Ex-Yugoslav Air Force Sabres in 1976.

Italy

- Italian Air Force operated 179 former Royal Air Force Canadair CL-13 Sabre Mk.4 supplied by the Mutual Defense Aid Program, redesignated F-86E(M) from 1956 until 1976

Pakistan

- Pakistan Air Force - Operated 90 Ex-Luftwaffe CL-13B Mk.6s from 1966 to 1980 which were obtained via Iran.
  - No. 14 Squadron "Tail Choppers"
  - No. 17 Squadron "Tigers"
  - No. 18 Squadron
  - No. 19 Squadron "Warhawks"

Union of South Africa

- South African Air Force

Turkey

- Turkish Air Force acquired ex-RCAF 107 Canadair CL-13 Sabre Mk.2 "F-86E(M)" in 1954, retired 1968.

United Kingdom

- Royal Air Force - Acquired three Canadair CL-13 Mark 2s and 428 Mark 4s, 8 December 1952 – 19 December 1953. During 1956–1958, 302 RAF Sabres were overhauled/modified in the UK and returned to the US Government (who, with the Canadians, had financed the aircraft for the Mutual Defense Aid Program) in camouflage colours with Canadian serials and redesignated as F-86E(M); of which 121 were then sent to Yugoslavia and 179 to Italy.
  - 3 Squadron 1953–1956 at RAF Wildenrath then RAF Geilenkirchen
  - 4 Squadron 1954–1955 at RAF Jever
  - 20 Squadron 1953–1955 at RAF Oldenburg
  - 26 Squadron 1953–1955 at RAF Oldenburg
  - 66 Squadron 1954–1956 at RAF Linton-on-Ouse
  - 67 Squadron 1953–1956 at RAF Wildenrath then RAF Bruggen
  - 71 Squadron 1953–1956 at RAF Wildenrath then RAF Bruggen
  - 92 Squadron 1954–1956 at RAF Linton-on-Ouse
  - 93 Squadron 1954–1956 at RAF Jever
  - 112 Squadron 1954–1956 at RAF Bruggen
  - 130 Squadron 1953–1956 at RAF Bruggen
  - 234 Squadron 1953–1956 at RAF Oldenburg then RAF Geilenkirchen

United States

- United States Air Force - Acquired 60 CL-13 Sabre Mk.2 in 1952 under the designation F-86E-6-CAN.

Yugoslavia

- JRV Yugoslav Air Force Received 46 former RAF Canadair CL-13 Mk.IV in 1956/57 through Mutual Defense Aid Program, and bought another 78 ex-RAF machines from MDAP in 1959, for a total of 121 Sabres, redesignated as F-86E(M).

== Specifications (Sabre Mk.6) ==
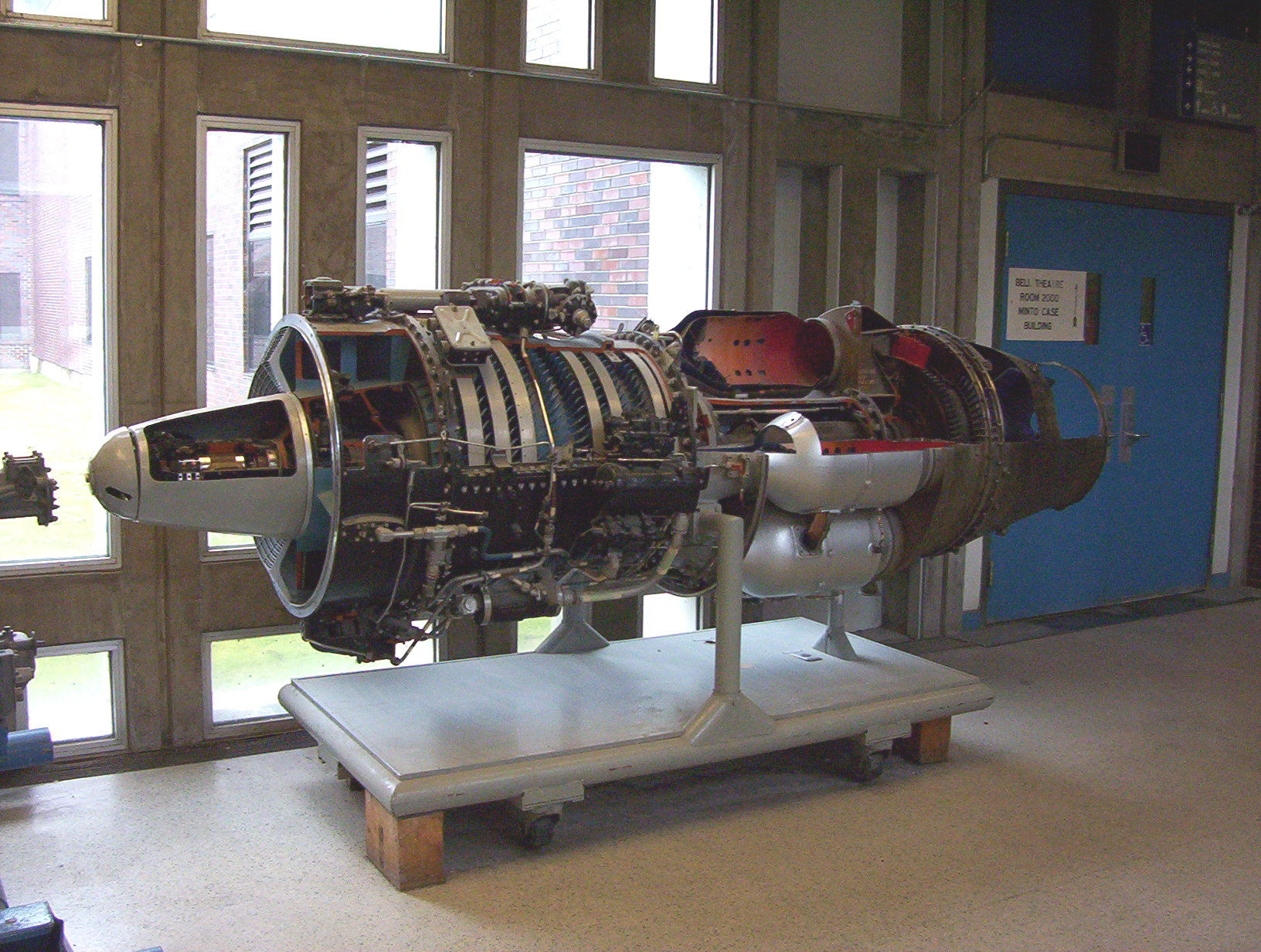
Orenda engine on display at Carleton University

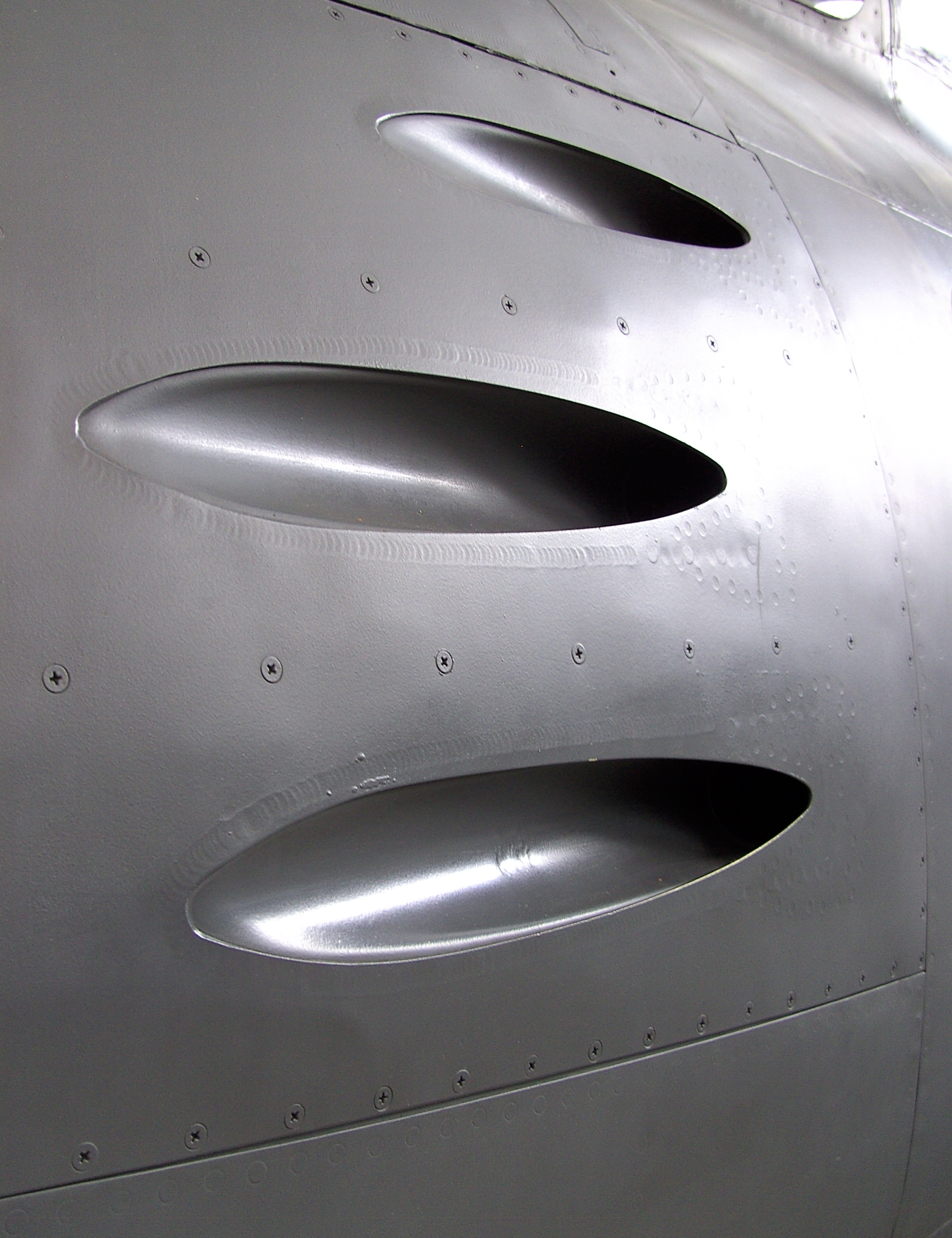
Machine gun ports of a Canadair CL-13B Sabre Mk 6

Data from Specification for the Canadair F-86 Sabre 6 Airplane for the Argentine Air Force, Report No. RD-13B-13 (Issue 1)

General characteristics

- Crew: One
- Length: 37.54 ft (11.44 m)
- Wingspan: 37.12 ft (11.31 m)
- Height: 14.74 ft (4.49 m)
- Wing area: 302.3 sq ft (28.08 m^{2})
- Airfoil: Root: NACA-0012 (11.6)-64 (Modified) / Tip: NACA-0011 (10.2)-64 (Modified)
- Empty weight: 10,638 lb (4,825 kg)
- Gross weight: 14,613 lb (6,628 kg) internal fuel
- Max takeoff weight: 17,580 lb (7,974 kg)
- Powerplant: 1 × Avro Canada Orenda 14 turbojet, 7,500 lbf (33 kN) thrust

Performance

- Maximum speed: 697 mph (1,122 km/h, 606 kn) at sea level
- Stall speed: 110 mph (178 km/h, 96 kn) at sea level
- Range: 1,481 mi (2,384 km, 1,287 nmi) ferry range with 2 x 200 gal drop tanks
- Service ceiling: 54,100 ft (16,500 m)
- Rate of climb: 12,050 ft/min (61.2 m/s)
- Wing loading: 58.154 lb/sq ft (283.93 kg/m^{2})
- Thrust/weight: 0.534
- All performance figures at a weight of ~14,044 lb

Armament

- Guns: 6 x 0.50 in (12.7 mm) M3 Browning machine guns (1,600 rounds total)
- Hardpoints: 4 , with provisions to carry combinations of:
  - Rockets: variety of rocket launchers; e.g: 2 Matra rocket pods with 18 SNEB 68 mm (2.7 in) rockets per pod, 16 5 in (130 mm) HVAR rockets
  - Missiles: 2 x infrared AIM-9B Sidewinders (Mk.6 only)
  - Bombs: 5,300 lb (2,400 kg) of payload on four external hardpoints, bombs are usually mounted on outer two pylons as the inner pairs are wet-plumbed pylons for 2 200 US gal (760 L; 170 imp gal) drop tanks to give the Sabre a useful range. A wide variety of bombs can be carried (max standard loadout being 2 1,000 lb (450 kg) bombs plus 2 drop tanks), napalm bomb canisters and can include a tactical nuclear weapon.

== See also ==
- 1972 Sacramento Canadair Sabre accident

Related development

- CAC Sabre
- North American FJ-1 Fury
- North American F-86 Sabre
- North American F-86D Sabre
- North American FJ-2/-3 Fury

Aircraft of comparable role, configuration, and era

- Dassault Mystère
- Mikoyan-Gurevich MiG-15

Related lists

- List of fighter aircraft
