= No. 96 Squadron RAF =

Defunct flying squadron of the Royal Air Force

- No. 96 Squadron badge
- Active: 8 October 1917 - 4 July 1918; 28 Sep 1918 - November 1918; 18 Dec 1940 - 12 December 1944; 21 Dec 1944 - 1 June 1946; 17 Nov 1952 – 21 January 1959
- Country: United Kingdom
- Branch: Royal Air Force
- Mottos: Latin: Nocturni obambulamus ("We prowl by night")

Insignia
- Squadron badge heraldry: A lion passant facing to the sinister with ten stars representing the constellation of Leo
- Squadron codes: ZJ December 1940 - December 1944; 6H December 1944 - June 1946; L October 1952 - 1955

No. 96 Squadron was a Royal Air Force squadron, formed as a training unit in the latter stages of the First World War. The squadron re-formed and served mainly as night fighter cover during the Second World War. In the aftermath of WWII it took on a transport role, but later returned to night fighter duties, this time with jet aircraft such as the Gloster Meteor and Gloster Javelin. It was disbanded in 1959, when its aircraft and personnel became No. 3 Squadron.

== History ==
No. 96 Squadron was formed on 8 October 1917 at Lincolnshire as an aircrew training unit of the Royal Flying Corps, the air force of the British Army during most of World War I. The unit was disbanded on 4 July 1918 but was reformed at St. Ives, Cambridgeshire on 28 September 1918 as a ground attack squadron of the Royal Air Force.

The headquarters of the squadron at that time were located at RAF Wyton. On 11 November 1918 an armistice between the Allies and the German Empire was signed, marking the end of World War I. As a consequence No. 96 Squadron was disbanded by the end of November, 1918 before becoming operational.

=== World War II ===
On 18 December 1940 No. 422 Flight, a night fighter unit stationed at RAF Shoreham was renamed to No. 96 Squadron. The commanding officer on reformation was Ronald Gustave Kellett, transferred from the Polish No. 303 Squadron RAF. The squadron's headquarters were located at RAF Cranage in Cheshire. During the war it was commanded by Edward Crew.

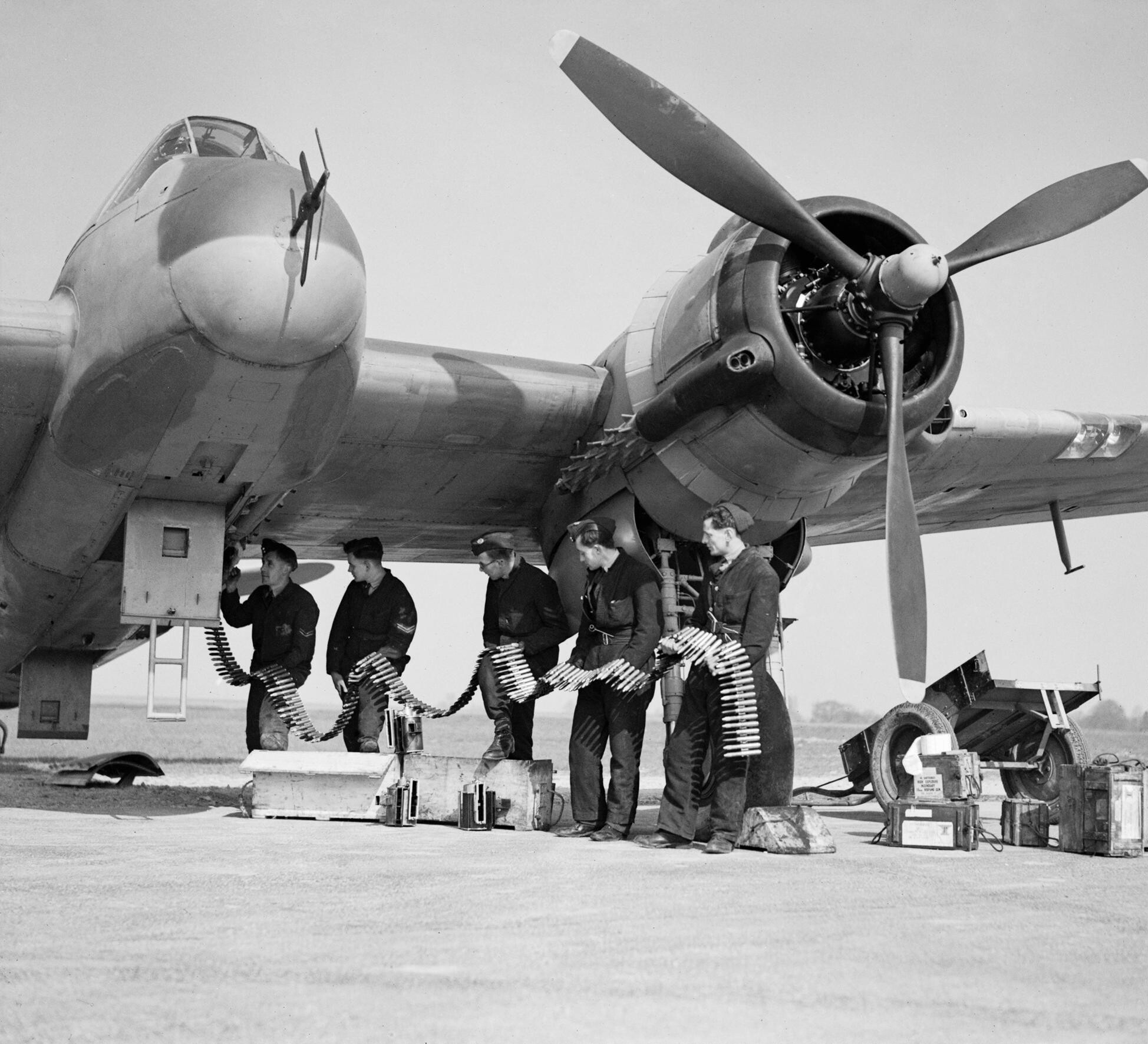
A Bristol Beaufighter VIF of No. 96 Squadron being re-armed at RAF Honiley, March 1943

=== Post World War II ===
In March 1945 the squadron was moved to the Far East. Destined for Egypt, the squadron collected its Dakotas en route in Egypt. The squadron provided parachute and glider training in India whilst also providing detachments for operations in Burma and general transport flights throughout the Far East. In April 1946 96 Squadron moved to Hong Kong where air transport was maintained to Malaya and China before the squadron was renamed No. 110 Squadron on 15 June 1946.

No. 96 Squadron reformed again on 17 November 1952 at RAF Ahlhorn in Germany as part of No. 125 Wing RAF. It moved to RAF Geilenkirchen on 12 February 1958. Equipped with Meteor night fighters the squadron provided fighter cover for Germany until it was renumbered No. 3 Squadron on 21 January 1959, at which point it converted to Gloster Javelins.

== Aircraft operated ==
Dates	Aircraft	Variant	Notes
1918	Sopwith Salamander		Single-engined ground attack biplane
1940-1941	Hawker Hurricane	I	Single-engined fighter
1941-1942	Boulton Paul Defiant	I	Single-engined fighter
1941-1942	Hawker Hurricane	IIC	Single-engined fighter
1942	Boulton Paul Defiant	IA and II	Single-engined fighter
1942-1943	Bristol Beaufighter	IIF and VIF	Twin-engined night fighter
1943-1944	de Havilland Mosquito	NF.XIII	Twin-engined night fighter
1944-1945	Handley Page Halifax	III	Four-engined bomber/transport
1945-1946	Douglas Dakota		Twin-engined transport
1952-1959	Gloster Meteor	NF11	Twin-engined jet night-fighter
1958-1959	Gloster Javelin	FAW4	Twin-engined jet fighter/interceptor

== See also ==
List of Royal Air Force aircraft squadrons
