= RAF Geilenkirchen =

Former Royal Air Force station in North Rhine-Westphalia, Germany

RAF Geilenkirchen
- Geilenkirchen, North Rhine-Westphalia in Germany

Site information
- Type: Royal Air Force station
- Owner: Ministry of Defence
- Operator: Royal Air Force
- Controlled by: RAF Second Tactical Air Force; Royal Air Force Germany

Location
- Shown within Germany
- Coordinates: 50°57′36.7″N 6°2′32.6″E

Site history
- Built: 1952/3
- In use: May 1953 – 28 January 1968

Airfield information
- Identifiers: IATA: GKE, ICAO: ETNG
- Elevation: 90 metres (295 ft) AMSL
Runways
Direction	Length and surface
09/27	3,048 metres (10,000 ft) Concrete
- Motto: Celer Respondere

Royal Air Force Geilenkirchen more commonly known as RAF Geilenkirchen is a former Royal Air Force station in the North Rhine-Westphalia region of Germany, built by the British who used the facility mainly as an airfield for RAF fighter squadrons from May 1953 until 21 January 1968.

== History ==
=== Geilenkirchen squadrons ===
- No 2 Squadron RAF – 1955–1957; operated the Gloster Meteor FR.9 and later the Supermarine Swift FR.5.
- No. 3 Squadron RAF – 1953–1957 and 1959–1961, 1961–68; operated the Hawker Hunter F.4, the Gloster Javelin FAW.4 and the English Electric Canberra B(I).8 (1961–68).
- No. 5 Squadron RAF – 1962–1965; operated the Gloster Javelin FAW.9.
- No. 11 Squadron RAF – 1959–1965; operated the Gloster Meteor NF.11 and later the Gloster Javelin FAW.4, FAW.5, FAW.9.
- No. 59 Squadron RAF – 1957–1961; operated the Canberra B.2 and B(I).8 (1957–61).
- No. 92 Squadron RAF – 1965–1968; operated the English Electric Lightning F.2, F.2A.
- No. 96 Squadron RAF – 1958–1959; operated the Gloster Javelin FAW.4.
- No. 234 Squadron RAF – 1954–1957; operated the Canadair Sabre F.4 and later the Hawker Hunter F.4.
- No. 256 Squadron RAF – 1958-1958; operated the Gloster Meteor NF.11.

=== Post RAF history ===
The RAF handed over the station to the West German Luftwaffe in March 1968. The Germans used the airfield as home for a surface-to-surface missile wing equipped with Pershing missiles with support from the United States Army.

== Current use ==
In 1980, the station became NATO Air Base Geilenkirchen, the main operating base for NATO's Airborne Early Warning and Control force, operating 14 Boeing E-3A Sentry aircraft.

== See also ==
- List of aircraft of the Royal Air Force
- List of former Royal Air Force stations
