= List of wings of the Royal Air Force =

Wings within the Royal Air Force have both administrative and tactical applications. Over the years, the structure and role of wings has changed to meet the demands placed on the RAF. Many of the RAF's numbered wings were originally Royal Flying Corps (RFC) or Royal Naval Air Service (RNAS) units.

Wings can be found at every station in the RAF and also abroad, deployed on operations.

== Wings by number ==
=== No. 1 Wing – No. 99 Wing ===
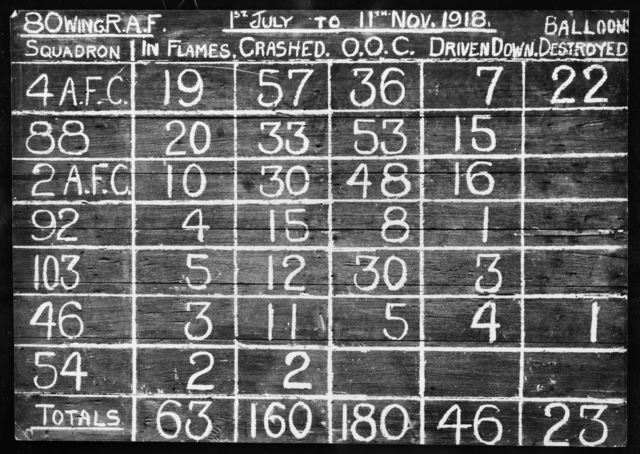
In late 1918, a scoreboard lists the claims for aircraft destroyed by No. 80 Wing RAF between July and November that year. The wing's squadrons at the time (including two from the Australian Flying Corps), are: 4 Sqn AFC, 88 Sqn RAF, 4 Sqn AFC, 92 Sqn RAF, 103 Sqn RAF, 46 Sqn RAF, and 54 Sqn RAF.

Wing	Date of establishment	Date of disestablishment	Notes
No. 1 Wing RAF	29 November 1914	5 March 1919	Originally Royal Flying Corps (RFC) Corps Wing
No. 1 Wing RAF	15 May 1919	?	At RAF Yatesbury
No. 1 Wing RAF	1 January 1926	12 April 1926	Army Cooperation Wing
No. 1 Wing RAF	23 September 1939	15 December 1937	General Reconnaissance Wing during Spanish Civil War with 209 and 210 Squadrons
No. 1 Wing RAF	25 August 1939	22 September 1939	Bomber Wing in Egypt with 30 and 55 Sqns
No. 1 Wing RAF	24 January 1940	24 June 1940	Barrage balloon Wing in France
No. 1 Wing RAF	October 1958	September 1961	Signals Wing
No. 1 Wing RAF	??		Air Mobility Wing
No. 2 Wing RAF	29 November 1914	12 September 1919	Originally RFC Corps Wing
No. 2 Wing RAF	15 May 1919	April 1920	At Plymouth with 238 Sqn
No. 2 Wing RAF	25 August 1939	21 September 1939	Bomber Wing in Egypt
No. 2 Wing RAF	3 November 1941	November 1941	112 Sqn and 3 Sqn RAAF
No. 2 Wing RAF	??		Force Protection Wing
No. 3 Wing RAF	1 March 1915	5 January 1918	Originally RFC Corps Wing
No. 3 Wing RAF	1 August 1918	13 June 1919	Training Wing
No. 3 Wing RAF	??		Force Protection Wing
No. 4 Wing RAF	29 November 1914	23 August 1916	RFC Training Wing
No. 4 Wing RAF	10 January 1917	15 May 1919	Originally RFC Reserve Wing
No. 4 Wing RAF	2 October 1935	24 August 1936	Flying Boat Wing
No. 4 Wing RAF	??		Force Protection Wing
No. 5 Wing RAF	29 November 1914	1 April 1920	Originally RFC; 1917–18: Corps Artillery Wing in Palestine Brigade, with 14 and 113 Squadrons (RE 8 and Nieuport), 142 Squadron (RE 8 and Armstrong Whitworth)
No. 5 Wing RAF	1 April 1923	April 1924	Controlled all fighter squadrons north of the Thames
No. 5 Wing RAF	16 October 1935	14 August 1936	Controlled 3, 35, 47 and 207 Sqns during the Abyssinia Crisis
No. 5 Wing RAF	13 December 1939	6 July 1940	Signals Wing controlling radar units in France
No. 5 Wing RAF	1 April 1953	September 1966	Signals Wing
No. 5 Wing RAF	??		Force Protection Wing
No. 6 Wing RAF	20 August 1915	22 November 1919	Originally RFC Training Wing
No. 6 Wing RAF	31 January 1916	July 1918	Existed concurrently in East Africa, controlling 26 Sqn
No. 7 Wing RAF	8 November 1915	12 September 1918	Originally RFC Training Wing
No. 7 Wing RAF	18 October 1919	9 July 1920	Training Wing
No. 7 Wing RAF	??		Force Protection Wing
No. 8 Wing RAF	15 November 1918	30 June 1919	Training Wing
No. 8 Wing RAF	30 June 1919	27 April 1920	Training Wing
No. 9 Wing RAF	6 May 1916	30 July 1919	Originally RFC HQ Wing
No. 9 Wing RAF	18 October 1918	?	?Training Wing
No. 10 Wing RAF	30 January 1916	5 March 1919	Originally RFC Army Wing
No. 10 Wing RAF	18 October 1919	7 February 1920	?Training Wing
No. 11 Wing RAF	10 February 1916	9 September 1919	Originally RFC Army Wing
No. 11 Wing RAF	April 1920	15 January 1923	Irish Wing
No. 12 Wing RAF	30 January 1916	20 September 1919	Originally RFC Army Wing
No. 12 Wing RAF	2 June 1922	7 February 1923	?Irish Wing
No. 13 Wing RAF	10 March 1916	1 March 1919	RFC Army Wing
No. 14 Wing RAF	1 April 1916	14 March 1919	Originally RFC Army Wing; on Italian Front January–November 1918
No. 15 Wing RAF	21 June 1916	20 March 1919	Originally RFC Reserve Army Wing
No. 15 Wing RAF	15 August 1943	12 July 1944	Fighter Wing
No. 16 Wing RAF	25 June 1916	29 July 1916	RFC Home Defence Wing
No. 16 Wing RAF	20 September 1916	14 November 1919	Originally RFC Corps Wing
No. 16 Wing RAF	5 July 1943	20 April 1944	Mobile Wing
No. 16 Wing RAF	8 March 1946	3 June 1946	
No. 17 Wing RAF	9 August 1916	12 August 1918	Originally RFC training Wing
No. 17 Wing RAF	28 September 1918	14 May 1919	Controlled units in Malta
No. 17 Wing RAF	4 July 1943	12 July 1944	Fighter Wing
No. 18 Wing RAF	25 March 1916	1 October 1919	Originally RFC Training/Home Defence Wing
No. 18 Wing RAF	December 1943	12 May 1944	Fighter Wing
No. 19 Wing RAF	1 May 1916	25 March 1919	Originally RFC Training/Home Defence Wing
No. 19 Wing RAF	December 1943	12 May 1944	Fighter Wing in 2nd Tactical Air Force
No. 20 Wing RAF	25 July 1916	22 July 1919	Originally RFC Training Wing in Egypt
No. 20 Wing RAF	December 1943	12 May 1944	Fighter Wing
No. 21 Wing RAF	9 August 1916	18 February 1919	RFC Training Wing
No. 21 Wing RAF	1 January 1944	12 May 1944	Base Defence Wing
No. 21 Wing RAF	1 May 1960	31 August 1963	Air Defence Missile Wing
No. 22 Wing RAF	14 September 1916	20 May 1919	Originally RFC Training Wing
No. 22 Wing RAF	9 January 1944	20 April 1944	Royal Canadian Air Force (RCAF) Fighter Wing
No. 23 Wing RAF	13 November 1916	31 May 1919	Originally RFC Training Wing
No. 23 Wing RAF	20 January 1944	20 April 1944	Fighter Wing
No. 24 Wing RAF	25 September 1916	8 April 1919	Originally RFC Training Wing
No. 24 Wing RAF	16 February 1944	12 May 1944	Base Defence Wing
No. 24 Wing RAF	1 April 1959	31 August 1963	Air Defence Missile Wing
No. 25 Wing RAF	18 September 1916	1 July 1918	Originally RFC Training Wing
No. 25 Wing RAF	1 March 1944	12 May 1944	Base Defence Wing
No. 26 Wing RAF	1 May 1917	4 April 1919	Originally RFC Training Wing
No. 27 Wing RAF	5 May 1917	1 April 1919	RFC Training Wing
No. 27 Wing RAF	1946		Maritime Strike Wing
No. 28 Wing RAF	15 May 1917	15 May 1919	RFC Training Wing
No. 29 Wing RAF	1 June 1917	9 April 1919	Originally RFC Flying Training Wing based at Shawbury (No. 9 TDS)
No. 30 Wing RAF	1 June 1917	October 1918	Originally RFC Training Wing
No. 30 Wing RAF	15 April 1941	2 July 1941	Became RAF Iceland
No. 31 Wing RAF	5 June 1917	January 1920	Originally RFC HQ/Corps Wing; became Mesopotamia Wing
No. 31 Wing RAF	15 April 1941	15 December 1941	Became RAF Long Kesh
No. 32 Wing RAF	5 November 1917	15 May 1919	Originally RFC Training Wing in Egypt
No. 32 Wing RAF	15 August 1941	1 July 1943	Army Cooperation Wing
No. 33 Wing RAF	30 August 1917	15 May 1919	Originally RFC Training Wing
No. 33 Wing RAF	15 August 1941	1 July 1943	Army Cooperation Wing
No. 34 Wing RAF	8 September 1917	12 October 1918	Originally RFC Training Wing
No. 34 Wing RAF	22 August 1941	30 September 1945	Army Cooperation Wing June 1944: reconnaissance wing in 2nd TAF at Northolt with Nos 16 (Spitfire PRXI), 69 (Wellington XIII) and 140 (Mosquito PRIX/XVI) Squadrons; September 1944 – May 1945: in 2nd TAF in North West Europe (composition as before)
No. 34 Wing RAF	1 April 1953	1 January 1961	Reconnaissance Wing
No. 34 Wing RAF	1 April 2006		Deployable Expeditionary Air Wing (EAW) (ISTAR) at Waddington
No. 35 Wing RAF	22 September 1917	9 April 1919	Originally RFC Training Wing
No. 35 Wing RAF	22 August 1941	22 June 1946	Army Cooperation Wing June 1944: reconnaissance wing in 84 Group, 2nd TAF at Gatwick with Nos 2 (Mustang II), 4 (Spitfire PRXI) and 268 (Mustang IA) Squadrons September 1944 – May 1945: in 84 Group, 2nd TAF in North West Europe with 2, 4 (PR) and 268 Sqns (Spitfire)
No. 36 Wing RAF	8 October 1917	23 June 1918	Originally RFC Training Wing
No. 36 Wing RAF	15 August 1941	16 July 1943	Army Cooperation Wing
No. 37 Wing RAF	15 October 1917	9 April 1919	Originally RFC Training Wing
No. 37 Wing RAF	August 1941	28 July 1943	Army Cooperation Wing
No. 38 Wing RAF	9 November 1917	15 April 1919	Originally RFC Training Wing
No. 38 Wing RAF	19 January 1942	11 October 1943	Army Cooperation Wing, raised to status of 38 Group September 1943: in Northwest African Troop Carrier Command with 296 Squadron (Albemarle)
No. 38 Wing RAF	1 April 2006	2011	Deployable Expeditionary Air Wing (Air Transport) at Lyneham
No. 38 Wing RAF	2011		Deployable Expeditionary Air Wing formed by RAF Brize Norton and RAF Northholt: Deployed to Barbados on Operation Ruman in September 2017 comprised: Elements of No. XXIV Squadron and No. 47 Squadron RAF with Hercules C4/C5.; Elements of No. LXX Squadron RAF with Atlas C1.; Elements of No. 99 Squadron RAF with Boeing C-17 Globemaster III.; Elements of No 1 Air Mobility Wing
No. 39 Wing RAF	27 October 1917	4 April 1919	Originally RFC Training Wing
No. 39 Wing RAF	3 December 1942	7 August 1945	RCAF Reconnaissance Wing June 1944: in 83 Group, 2nd TAF at Odiham with Nos 168, 414 (RCAF) and 430 (RCAF) Squadrons (Mustang I), 400 (RCAF) Squadron (Spitfire PRXI) September 1944 – May 1945: in 83 Group, 2nd TAF in North West Europe with 400 (RCAF), 414 (RCAF) and 430 (RCAF) (Spitfire) Sqns All three constituent squadrons disbanded at Lüneburg Airfield in August 1945, and there is an additional note that the wing disbanded at Lüneburg on 2 August 1945.
No. 40 Wing RAF	5 October 1917	1 April 1920	Originally RFC Army Wing; 1917–18: in Palestine Brigade, with 1 Squadron Australian Flying Corps (Bristol Fighter and Handley Page), 111 (SE-5A), 144 (DH-9) and 145 (SE-5A) Squadrons
No. 41 Wing RAF	11 October 1917	15 February 1919	Originally RFC day bomber wing at Azelot (HQ at Lupcourt) in Independent Air Force (IAF) October 1917 – November 1918 with 55 (DH4), 99 and 104 Sqns (DH9)
No. 42 Wing RAF	October 1917	1919	Originally RFC Training Wing formed in Canada
No. 42 Wing RAF	May 2007		Expeditionary Support Wing
No. 43 Wing RAF	October 1917	1919	Originally RFC Training Wing formed in Canada
No. 44 Wing RAF	October 1917	1919	Originally RFC Training Wing formed in Canada
No. 45 Wing RAF	October 1917	1919	Originally Training Wing to form in Canada, never activated
No. 45 Wing RAF	15 February 1946	15 June 1946	Transport Wing formed from 45 Group
No. 46 Wing RAF	29 October 1917	6 March 1919	Originally RFC Home Defence Wing
No. 47 Wing RAF	29 October 1917	13 June 1919	Originally RFC Home Defence Wing
No. 48 Wing RAF	1 February 1918	13 June 1919	Originally RFC Home Defence Wing
No. 49 Wing RAF	29 October 1917	13 June 1919	Originally RFC Home Defence Wing
No. 50 Wing RAF	29 October 1917	22 May 1919	Originally RFC Home Defence Wing
No. 50 Wing RAF	11 January 1937	6 August 1940	Army Cooperation wing with British Expeditionary Force (BEF) Air Component in France 1939–40, Nos 4, 13, and 16 Squadrons flying Westland Lysanders.
No. 50 Wing RAF	21 April 1941	21 November 1942	Maintenance Wing
No. 51 Wing RAF	November 1917	30 July 1919	Originally RFC Corps Wing in VII Brigade RFC on Italian Front November 1917 – March 1918
No. 51 Wing RAF	11 May 1939	10 June 1940	Army Cooperation Wing with BEF Air Component in France 1939–45 with 2, 26 and 81 Sqns
No. 51 Wing RAF	21 April 1941	21 November 1942	Maintenance Wing
No. 52 Wing RAF	September 1918	1 April 1920	Corps Wing formed in India; redesignated No. 3 Indian Wing
No. 52 Wing RAF	1 November 1939	14 July 1940	Bomber wing with BEF Air Component in France 1939–45, Nos 53 and 59 Sqns
No. 52 Wing RAF	21 May 1941	21 November 1942	Maintenance Wing
No. 53 Wing RAF	8 February 1918	13 June 1919	Originally RFC Home Defence Wing
No. 53 Wing RAF	23 March 1941	1 January 1946	Maintenance Wing
No. 54 Wing RAF	6 March 1918	8 May 1919	Originally RFC Night Wing
No. 54 Wing RAF	25 May 1942	9 October 1946	Maintenance Wing
No. 55 Wing RAF	6 March 1918	25 September 1919	Originally RFC Training Wing
No. 55 Wing RAF	1 August 1942	15 January 1947	Barrack & Clothing/Maintenance Wing
No. 56 Wing RAF	August 1918	15 May 1919	Training Wing
No. 56 Wing RAF	22 July 1944	15 October 1946	Maintenance Wing
No. 57 Wing RAF	1918	3 July 1918	Training Wing
No. 57 Wing RAF	22 July 1944	15 January 1947	Maintenance Wing
No. 58 Wing RAF	1 April 1918	21 December 1918	Training Wing
No. 59 Wing RAF	27 July 1918	24 June 1919	Training Wing
No. 60 Wing RAF	27 July 1918	14 September 1918	Training Wing
No. 60 Wing RAF	30 August 1939	20 January 1940	Fighter Wing, raised to No. 14 Group
No. 60 Wing RAF	20 January 1940	31 May 1940	Fighter wing with BEF Air Component in France 1939–45, Nos 85 and 87 Sqns
No. 61 Wing RAF	1 April 1918	13 November 1918	Naval
No. 61 Wing RAF	10 October 1939	31 May 1940	Fighter wing with BEF Air Component in France 1939–45, Nos 607 and 615 Sqns
No. 62 Wing RAF	1 April 1918	1 October 1918	Naval
No. 62 Wing RAF	10 October 1939	31 May 1940	Fighter Servicing Wing
No. 63 Wing RAF	1 April 1918	21 May 1919	Naval
No. 63 Wing RAF	20 February 1940	31 May 1940	Fighter Servicing Wing
No. 64 Wing RAF	1 April 1918	22 April 1919	Naval
No. 64 Wing RAF	6 June 1918	15 September 1919	Egypt
No. 64 Wing RAF	2 July 1940	1 August 1940	Wing Servicing Unit
No. 65 Wing RAF	1 April 1918	1 March 1919	Naval
No. 65 Wing RAF	1940	24 June 1940	Wing Servicing Unit
No. 66 Wing RAF	1 April 1918	15 August 1919	Former No. 6 Wing RNAS at Otranto, Italy, April–November 1918 with 224 and 225 Sqns
No. 67 Wing RAF	1 April 1918	6 December 1918	Naval at Taranto April–November 1918 with 226 Sqn at Pizzone and 227 Sqn non-operational
No. 67 Wing RAF	6 November 1939	24 July 1940	Fighter wing with RAF Advanced Air Striking Force (AASF) in France 1939–45, Nos 1, 73, and 212 (PR) Squadrons
No. 68 Wing RAF	11 July 1918	1 September 1919	Operations Wing
No. 69 Wing RAF	21 July 1918	25 July 1919	Training Wing
No. 69 Wing RAF	15 March 1945	20 October 1945	Signals Wing
No. 70 Wing RAF	20 August 1918	1 May 1919	Operations Wing
No. 70 Wing RAF	1 September 1939	1 July 1940	Bomber Wing In September 1939, Nos. 18 and 57 Sqns at RAF Upper Heyford as part of No. 2 Group RAF; Bomber-Reconnaissance wing with BEF Air Component in France 1939–45, Nos 18 and 57 Sqns
No. 70 Wing RAF	17 February 1941	31 May 1946	Signals Wing
No. 70 Wing RAF	22 August 1951	1 August 1953	Signals Wing
No. 71 Wing RAF	20 August 1918	1 May 1919	Operations Wing
No. 71 Wing RAF	1 September 1939	1 July 1940	Bomber Wing with RAF AASF in France 1939–45, Nos 105, 114, 139 and 150 Sqns
No. 71 Wing RAF	17 February 1941	30 June 1943	Signals Wing
No. 72 Wing RAF	8 August 1918	15 May 1919	Operations Wing
No. 72 Wing RAF	23 August 1939	6 February 1940	Bomber Wing
No. 72 Wing RAF	17 February 1941	15 May 1944	Signals Wing
No. 72 Wing RAF	15 May 1944	22 September 1946	Signals Wing
No. 73 Wing RAF	20 August 1918	1 May 1919	Operations Wing
No. 73 Wing RAF	17 February 1941	1 November 1946	Signals Wing
No. 74 Wing RAF	20 August 1918	1 May 1919	Operations Wing
No. 74 Wing RAF	24 August 1939	10 February 1940	Bomber Wing
No. 74 Wing RAF	17 February 1941	30 June 1946	Signals Wing
No. 75 Wing RAF	8 August 1918	15 May 1919	Operations Wing
No. 75 Wing RAF	24 August 1939	30 June 1940	Bomber Wing with RAF AASF in France 1939–45; in May 1940 consisted of 88 Sqn at Mourmelon, 103 Sqn at Betheniville and 208 Sqn at Auberive (Battles).
No. 75 Wing RAF	10 February 1941	15 April 1941	Bomber Wing
No. 75 Wing RAF	17 February 1941	1 November 1946	Signals Wing
No. 76 Wing RAF	20 August 1918	1 December 1918	Operations Wing
No. 76 Wing RAF	24 August 1939	24 June 1940	Bomber Wing with RAF AASF in France 1939–45, 12, 142, and 226 Sqns
No. 76 Wing RAF	17 February 1941	30 June 1943	Signals Wing
No. 77 Wing RAF	8 August 1918	1 November 1918	Operations Wing
No. 77 Wing RAF	17 February 1941	15 May 1944	Signals Wing
No. 78 Wing RAF	8 August 1918	November 1918	Operations Wing
No. 78 Wing RAF	25 May 1941	31 July 1946	Signals Wing: Chain Home technical control wing at RAF Ashburton in Devon.
No. 79 Wing RAF	8 August 1918	November 1918	Operations Wing
No. 79 Wing RAF	22 August 1939	?	Bomber Wing September 1939 at Watton in 2 Group, Bomber Command, with 21 and 82 Sqns (Blenheim I & IV)
No. 79 Wing RAF	27 September 1941	30 June 1943	Signals Wing
No. 80 Wing RAF	1 July 1918	1 March 1919	Army Wing consisted of two Australian Flying Corps units (Nos 2 and 4 Squadrons, AFC) as well as Nos 46, 54, 88, 92 and 103 Squadrons, RAF
No. 80 Wing RAF	7 October 1940	24 September 1945	Electronic Countermeasures (ECM) Wing at Radlett
No. 80 Wing RAF	1 August 1953	15 March 1957	
No. 81 Wing RAF	3 June 1918	21 June 1918	Corps Wing
No. 81 Wing RAF	1 July 1918	1 March 1919	Corps Wing
No. 81 Wing RAF	August 1939	18 September 1939	Bomber Wing
No. 81 Wing RAF	2 June 1941	30 April 1946	Signals Wing
No. 82 Wing RAF	3 June 1918	1 March 1919	
No. 82 Wing RAF	August 1939	?	Bomber Wing September 1939: at Wyton in 2 Group, Bomber Command, with 114 and 139 Sqns (Blenheim I & IV)
No. 83 Wing RAF	3 June 1918	1 March 1919	Night bomber wing at Xaffévillers in IAF June–November 1918 with 97, 100 and 215 Sqns (Handley Page O/400)
No. 83 Wing RAF	August 1939	?	Bomber Wing September 1939: at Wattisham in 2 Group, Bomber Command, with 107 and 110 Sqns (Blenheim I & IV)
No. 83 Wing RAF	19 August 1942	July 1943	Signals Wing
No. 84 Wing RAF	12 October 1918	3 November 1919	Night bomber wing at Roville-aux-Chênes in IAF August–November 1918 with 115 and 216 Sqns (Handley Page O/400)
No. 84 Wing RAF	1 May 1943	1 September 1944	Signals Wing
No. 85 Wing RAF	September 1918	November 1918	Day bomber wing at Bettoncourt in IAF September–November 1918 with 110 Sqn (DH9a) and 45 Sqn (Sopwith Camel, re-equipping with Sopwith Snipe for escort)
No. 85 Wing RAF	1 July 1946	31 October 1948	Reformed from 85 (Base) Group 1 July 1946 HQ was at Uetersen, Germany, 1 September 1947 – 31 October 1948.
No. 85 Wing RAF	April 2006		Expeditionary Logistics Wing
No. 86 Wing RAF	29 September 1918	10 December 1918	Night Bomber Wing
No. 86 Wing RAF	13 December 1918	8 October 1919	Communications Wing
No. 86 Wing RAF	5 May 1939	16 February 1940	General Reconnaissance Wing
No. 87 Wing RAF	29 August 1918	10 December 1918	Night Bomber Wing
No. 87 Wing RAF	1944	?	
No. 87 Wing RAF	15 July 1946	26 August 1946	Transport Wing
No. 88 Wing RAF	17 October 1918	1919	Day Bomber Wing
No. 88 Wing RAF	6 August 1942	18 November 1942	
No. 88 Wing RAF	1944		
No. 89 Wing RAF	October 1918	1919	Army Wing
No. 90 Wing RAF	6 November 1918	1 March 1919	Army Wing
No. 91 Wing RAF	24 October 1918	1919	Army Wing
No. 96 Wing RAF	1 October 1941	10 May 1944	Wireless (Observer) Wing

=== No. 100 Wing – No. 199 Wing ===
Wing	Date of establishment	Date of disestablishment	Notes
No. 100 Wing RAF	2 May 1939	9 September 1941	General Reconnaissance Wing
No. 101 Wing RAF	16 February 1940	July 1941	General Reconnaissance Wing
No. 102 Wing RAF	14 April 1941	31 January 1942	General Reconnaissance Wing
No. 103 Wing RAF	12 February 1945	30 September 1946	Air Disarmament Wing
No. 104 Wing RAF	5 February 1945	1 October 1945	Photographic Reconnaissance Wing
No. 105 Wing RAF	28 February 1943	14 August 1944	Combined Operations Wing
No. 106 Wing RAF	3 July 1943	14 April 1944	Photographic Reconnaissance Wing
No. 107 Wing RAF	26 June 1943	7 August 1943	Special Duties Wing
No. 107 Wing RAF	16 October 1944	1 September 1945	Transport Wing
No. 108 Wing RAF	29 September 1944	8 May 1946	Transport Wing
No. 109 Wing RAF	10 October 1944	1 March 1946	Transport Wing
No. 110 Wing RAF	1 March 1940	5 May 1941	Anti-Aircraft Cooperation Wing
No. 110 Wing RAF	3 July 1944	15 February 1946	Transport Wing
No. 111 Wing RAF			
No. 112 Wing RAF			
No. 113 Wing RAF			
No. 114 Wing RAF			
No. 115 Wing RAF			
No. 116 Wing RAF			
No. 117 Wing RAF			
No. 118 Wing RAF			
No. 119 Wing RAF			
No. 120 Wing RAF			
No. 121 Expeditionary Air Wing			June 1944: in 83 Group, 2nd TAF at Holmsley South with 174, 175 and 245 Squadrons (Typhoon); September 1944 – May 1945: in 83 Group, 2nd TAF in North West Europe with 175, 184, 245 (Typhoon) Sqns
No. 121 Expeditionary Air Wing	1 April 2006		Deployable Expeditionary Air Wing based at RAF Coningsby: Deployed to RAF Akrotiri from August to November 2013 for Operation Luminous comprised; Elements of No. XI Squadron with Typhoon FGR4; Elements of No. 8 Squadron with Sentry AEW1; Elements of No. 216 Squadron with Tristar; Elements of No. 1 Air Control Centre with T101 Radar; Elements of No. 4 Force Protection Wing; Deployed to Ämari Air Base from April to September 2015 for Operation Azotize in support of the NATO air policing mission with Typhoon FGR4
No. 122 Expeditionary Air Wing			June 1944:: in 83 Group, 2nd TAF at Funtington with 19, 65 and 122 Squadrons (Mustang III); September 1944 – May 1945: in 83 Group, 2nd TAF in North West Europe with 3, 56, 80, 486 (RNZAF) (Tempest V) and 616 (Meteor) Sqns
No. 122 Expeditionary Air Wing	1 April 2006	2012	Deployable Expeditionary Air Wing based at RAF Cottesmore
No. 123 Wing RAF			June 1944: in 84 Group, 2nd TAF at Thorney Island with 198 and 609 Squadrons (Typhoon) September 1944 – May 1945: in 84 Group, 2nd TAF in North West Europe with 164, 183, 198, 609 (Typhoon) Sqns
No. 124 Wing RAF			June 1944: in 83 Group, 2nd TAF at Hurn with 181, 182 and 247 Squadrons (Typhoon) September 1944 – May 1945: in 83 Group, 2nd TAF in North West Europe with 137, 181, 182, 247 (Typhoon) Sqns
No. 125 Expeditionary Air Wing			June 1944: in 83 Group, 2nd TAF at Ford with 132, 453 (RAAF) and 602 Squadrons (Spitfire IX LF) September 1944 – May 1945: in 83 Group, 2nd TAF in North West Europe with 41, 130, 350 (Belgian) (Spitfire) Sqns; Later: fighter wing at Leuchars
No. 125 Expeditionary Air Wing	1 April 2006	2013	Deployable Expeditionary Air Wing based at RAF Leuchars
No. 126 Wing RAF			June 1944: Canadian wing in 83 Group, 2nd TAF at Tangmere with 401, 411 and 412 RCAF Squadrons (Spitfire IX LF) September 1944 – May 1945: in 83 Group, 2nd TAF in North West Europe with 401 (RCAF), 402 (RCAF), 411 (RCAF), 412 (RCAF) (Spitfire) Sqns
No. 127 Wing RAF			June 1944: Canadian wing in 83 Group, 2nd TAF at Tangmere with 403, 416 and 421 RCAF Squadrons (Spitfire IX LF) September 1944 – May 1945: in 83 Group, 2nd TAF in North West Europe with 403 (RCAF), 416 (RCAF), 421 (RCAF), 443 (RCAF) (Typhoon) Sqns
No. 128 Wing RAF			
No. 129 Wing RAF			June 1944: Canadian wing in 83 Group, 2nd TAF at Westhampnett with 184 Sqn (Typhoon)
No. 130 Wing RAF			
No. 131 Wing RAF			1st Polish Fighter Wing: June 1944 in 84 Group, 2nd TAF at Selsey with 302, 308 and 317 Squadrons (Spitfire IX LF); September 1944 – May 1945: in 84 Group, 2nd TAF in North West Europe (composition as before); attacked by Jagdgeschwader 1 during Operation Bodenplatte
No. 132 Wing RAF			June 1944: Norwegian wing in 84 Group, 2nd TAF at Bognor with 6, 331 (Nor) and 332 (Nor) Sqns (Spitfire IX LF) September 1944 – May 1945: in 84 Group, 2nd TAF in North West Europe with 66, 127, 322 (Dutch)) (Spitfire) Sqns
No. 133 Wing RAF			2nd Polish Fighter Wing: June 1944 in 84 Group, 2nd TAF at Coolham with 129, 306 (Pol) and 315 (Pol) Sqns (Mustang III)
No. 134 Wing RAF			June 1944: Czech wing in 84 Group, 2nd TAF at Appledram with 310, 313 Czech Sqns (Spitfire IX LF)
No. 135 Wing RAF			June 1944: in 84 Group, 2nd TAF at Chailey with 222, 349 (Belgian) and 485 (RNZAF) Sqns (Spitfire IX LF) September 1944 – May 1945: in 84 Group, 2nd TAF in North West Europe with 33, 222, 274 (Typhoon) 349 (Belgian) (Spitfire) Sqns
No. 135 Wing RAF	1 April 2006		Deployable Expeditionary Air Wing based at RAF Leeming: Deployed to Šiauliai, Lithuania from April to September 2014 for Operation Azotize in support of the NATO air policing mission with Typhoon FGR4; Deployed to Mihail Kogalniceanu airbase near Constanta, in Romania in April 2017 in support of the NATO air policing mission with Typhoon FGR4; Deployed to Mihail Kogalniceanu airbase near Constanta, in Romania in April 2018 in support of the NATO air policing mission with Typhoon FGR4; Deployed to Šiauliai, Lithuania from April to September 2019 for Operation Azotize in support of the NATO air policing mission with Typhoon FGR4.
No. 136 Wing RAF			June 1944: in 84 Group, 2nd TAF at Thorney Island with 164 and 183 Squadrons (Typhoon) September 1944 – May 1945: in 2 Group, 2nd TAF in North West Europe with 418 (RCAF), 605 (Mosquito) Sqns
No. 137 Wing RAF			June 1944: in 2 Group, 2nd TAF at Hartford Bridge with 88 (Boston IIIA), 226 (Mitchell II) and 342 (French) (Boston IIIA) Squadrons September 1944 – May 1945: in 2 Group, 2nd TAF in North West Europe with 226, 342 (French) (Mitchell) Sqns
No. 138 Wing			June 1944: in 2 Group, 2nd TAF at Lasham with 107, 305 (Polish) and 613 Sqns (Mosquito VI); September 1944 – May 1945: in 2 Group, 2nd TAF in North West Europe (composition as before); Today: Fighter / Ground Attack wing at Marham
No. 138 Wing	1 April 2006		Deployable Expeditionary Air Wing based at RAF Marham: Believed to have deployed to West Africa in 2014 for Operation Turus with Tornado GR4
No. 139 Wing RAF			June 1944: in 2 Group, 2nd TAF at Dunsfold with 98, 180 and 320 (Dutch) Sqns (Mitchell II) September 1944 – May 1945: in 2 Group, 2nd TAF in North West Europe (composition as before)
No. 140 Wing RAF	20 September 1943	May 1945	June 1944: in 2 Group, 2nd TAF at with 21, 464 (RAAF) and 487 (RNZAF) Sqns (Mosquito VI) at Gravesend; 137 Sqn (Typhoon) at Manston September 1944 – May 1945: in 2 Group, 2nd TAF in North West Europe with 21, 461 (RAAF), 487 (RNZAF) (Mosquito) Sqns
No. 140 Wing RAF	1 April 2006		Deployable Expeditionary Air Wing based at RAF Lossiemouth: Deployed to RAF Akrotiri from August to December 2014 for Operation Shader, succeeded by 903 EAW, comprised: Elements of the RAF Tornado Force (Tornado GR4 strike aircraft); Elements of the RAF Air Mobility Force: Hercules C5 transport aircraft; Voyager KC3 tanker aircraft; Deployed to Ämari Air Base from April to September 2016 for Operation Azotize in support of the NATO air policing mission with Typhoon FGR4
No. 141 Wing RAF			June 1944: in 85 Group, 2nd TAF at Hartford Bridge with 91, 124 and 322 (Dutch) Sqns (Spitfire XIV)
No. 142 Wing RAF			June 1944: Night fighter wing in 85 Group, 2nd TAF with 264 and 604 Sqns (Mosquito XIII) September 1944 – May 1945: Air/Sea Rescue wing in 85 Group, 2nd TAF in North West Europe with 276 Sqn (Spitfire/Walrus)
No. 143 Wing RAF			June 1944: Canadian wing in 83 Group, 2nd TAF at Hurn with 438, 439 and 440 RCAF Sqns (Typhoon) September 1944 – May 1945: in 83 Group, 2nd TAF in North West Europe (composition as before)
No. 144 Wing RAF			June 1944: Canadian wing in 83 Group, 2nd TAF at Ford with 441, 442 and 443 (RCAF) Sqns (Spitfire IX LF) g
No. 145 Wing RAF			June 1944: in 2nd TAF at Merston with 329, 340 and 341 Sqns (Spitfire IX LF) September 1944 – May 1945: French wing in 84 Group, 2nd TAF in North West Europe with 74, 340 (French), 341 (French), 345 (French), 485 (RNZAF) (Spitfire) Sqns
No. 146 Wing RAF			June 1944: in 2nd TAF at Needs Oar Point with 193, 197, 257 and 266 Sqns (Typhoon)
No. 147 Wing RAF			June 1944: Night fighter wing in 85 Group, 2nd TAF with 29 Sqn (Mosquito)
No. 148 Wing RAF			June 1944: Night fighter wing in 85 Group, 2nd TAF with 409 (RCAF) Sqn (Mosquito) September 1944 – May 1945: in 85 Group, 2nd TAF in North West Europe with 264, 409 (RCAF) (Mosquito) Sqns
No. 149 Wing RAF			June 1944: Canadian night fighter wing in 85 Group, 2nd TAF with 410 and 488 RCAF Sqs (Mosquito) September 1944 – May 1945: in 85 Group, 2nd TAF in North West Europe with 219, 410 (RCAF), 488 (RCAF) (Mosquito) Sqns
No. 150 Wing RAF			June 1944: in 85 Group under operational control of 2nd TAF with 3 (Tempest V), 56 (Spitfire IX LF; Tempest from July) and 486 (RNZAF) (Tempest V) Sqns at Newchurch and 124 (Spitfire VII) Sqn at Bradwell Bay
No. 151 Wing RAF			Fought alongside the Soviets on the Kola Peninsula during the first months of Operation Barbarossa during the Second World War. After the war, an air defence missile formation.
No. 152 Wing RAF			
No. 153 Wing RAF			
No. 154 Wing RAF			
No. 155 Wing RAF			
No. 156 Wing RAF			
No. 157 Wing RAF			
No. 159 Wing RAF			
No. 160 Wing RAF			
No. 164 Wing RAF			
No. 165 Wing RAF			June 1943: at Comilla in 224 Group with 79 and 146 Sqns (Hurricane)
No. 166 Wing RAF			June 1943: at Chittagong in 224 Group with 67 and 261 Sqns (Hurricane) Redesignated 902 Wing
No. 167 Wing RAF			
No. 168 Wing RAF			June 1943: at Digri in 221 Group with 159 Sqn (Liberator) at Salbani and detachment 28 Sqn (Hurricane) at Alipore; non-operational: 2 Sqn (RIAF) (Hurricane) at Ranchi, 5 Sqn (Hurricane) at Kharagpur, 45 and 110 Sqns (Vengeance) at Digri, 82 Sqn (Vengeance) at Salbani and 177 Sqn (Beaufighter) at Amarda Road.
No. 169 Wing RAF			June 1943: at Agartala in 224 Group with 17 (Hurricane) and 27 (Beaufighter) Sqns
No. 170 Wing RAF			June 1943: at Imphal in 221 Group with 155 (Mohawk) and detachment 28 Sqn (Hurricane), and 42 Sqn at Kumbhirgram Redesignated 908 Wing
No. 171 Wing RAF			25/11/1942 - 30/9/1944; Army Co-operation/Reconnaissance/Photo Reconnaissance No. 681 Squadron RAF and No. 684 Squadron RAF 1 July 1944
No. 172 Wing RAF			18/10/1942 - 1/12/1944; Composite
No. 173 Wing RAF			25/11/1942 - 1/3/1945; Composite; Naval Co-operation
No. 174 Wing RAF			
No. 175 Wing RAF			June 1943: at Jessore in 221 Group with 99 and 215 Sqns (Wellington) December 1944 and June 1945: in 231 Group with 99 Sqn (Liberator) Sqn
No. 177 Wing RAF			December 1944: Transport Wing in Combat Cargo Task Force, Eastern Air Command (EAC) with 31, 62, 117 and 194 Sqns (Dakota)
No. 179 Wing RAF			
No. 180 Wing RAF			
No. 181 Wing RAF			
No. 182 Wing RAF			
No. 183 Wing RAF			
No. 183 Wing RAF			
No. 184 Wing RAF			December 1944 and June 1945: in 231 Group, Strategic Air Force EAC, with 355 and 356 Sqns (Liberator)
No. 185 Wing RAF			December 1944: in 231 Group, Strategic Air Force EAC, with 159, 215, 357 Sqns (Liberator) June 1945: in 231 Group, RAF Burma, with 159 (Liberator), 357 (Liberator/Dakota), 358 (Liberator) Sqns and 1341 Flight (Halifax) October 1945: at Penang in RAF Malaya with a detachment of 27 Sqn (Beaufighter)
No. 186 Wing RAF			
No. 187 Wing RAF			
No. 188 Wing RAF			
No. 189 Wing RAF			
No. 190 Wing RAF			
No. 191 Wing RAF			
No. 192 Wing RAF			

=== No. 200 Wing – No. 299 Wing ===
Wing	Date of establishment	Date of disestablishment	Notes
No. 215 Wing RAF			Helilifted into Port Said Airport in November 1956 during the Suez Crisis. Seemingly the RAF unit which ran the airfield. Stayed until December 1956 when the airfield was handed over to the Danish Battalion of UNEF I.
No. 231 Wing RAF			May 1942: Medium Bomber Wing in 205 Group at El Daba, Egypt, with 37, 70 and 108 Squadrons (Wellington IC); September–October 1942: 37 and 70 Squadrons; September 1943: in Northwest African Strategic Air Force (NASAF) with 37 and 70 Sqns (Wellington III/X); January 1944: in Mediterranean Allied Strategic Air Force (MASAF) with 37 and 70 Sqns (Wellington X); April 1945: in 205 Group MASAF with 37 and 70 Sqns (Liberator VI)
No. 232 Wing RAF			October 1942: Bomber Wing in Western Desert Air Force (WDAF) with 55 and 223 Squadrons RAF (Baltimore), 82, 83 and 343 Bombardment Squadrons, USAAF (Mitchell II); January 1944: in Desert Air Force (DAF) with 18, 114 (Boston) and 223 (Baltimore) Sqns; April 1945: in DAF with 13, 18, 114 Sqns (Boston IV/V), 55 Sqn (Boston V) and 256 Sqn (Mosquito XII/XIII)
No. 233 Wing RAF			May–October 1942: Fighter Wing in 211 Group WDAF at Gambut with 2 (SAAF) and 260 Squadrons (Kittyhawk I) and 4 (SAAF) and 5 (SAAF) (Tomahawk)
No. 234 Wing RAF			October 1942: in Egypt with 889 Squadron Fleet Air Arm (FAA) (Fulmar II and Hurricane IIC)
No. 235 Wing RAF			October 1942: General Reconnaissance Wing under 201 Group in Egypt with 13 (Greek) (Blenheim IV/Bisley), 47 (Wellesley), 450 (RAAF) (Hudson III) and 701 (FAA) (Walrus) Squadrons; January 1944: in 201 Group under RAF Middle East Command with 13 (Greek), 15 (SAAF) (Baltimore), 47 (Beaufighter), 459 (RAAF) (Hudson/Ventura) and 603 (Beaufighter) Sqns
No. 236 Wing RAF			May 1942: Medium Bomber Wing in 205 Group at El Daba with 104 and 148 Squadrons (Wellington IC and II); September–October 1942: 108 and 148 Squadrons; September 1943: in NASAF with 40 and 104 Sqns (Wellington III/X); January 1944: in MASAF with 40 and 104 Sqns (Wellington III/X); April 1945: in 205 Group MASAF, with 40 and 104 Sqns (Liberator VI)
No. 237 Wing RAF			
No. 238 Wing RAF			May 1942:Medium Bomber Wing in 205 Group with 38 Squadron at Maaten Bagush and 140 Squadron at Shallufa (Wellington IC); September–October 1942: 40 (Wellington IC) and 104 (Wellington II) Squadrons; September 1943: in Air Defences, Eastern Mediterranean, with 16 (SAAF) Sqn (Beaufort)
No. 239 Wing RAF			May and September 1942: Fighter Wing in 211 Group WDAF at Gambut with 3 (RAAF), 112, 250 and 450 (RAAF) Squadrons (Kittyhawk I); October 1942: 66 Fighter Squadron USAAF attached September 1943: in DAF with 112, 250, 260 and 450 (RAAF) Sqns (Kittyhawk); January 1944: in DAF with 3 (RAAF), 5 (SAAF), 112, 250, 260 and 450 (RAAF) Sqns (Kittyhawk); April 1945: in DAF with 3 (RAAF), 5 (SAAF), 112, and 260 Sqns (Mustang III/IV), 250 and 450 (RAAF) Sqns (Kittyhawk IV)
No. 240 Wing RAF			September 1943: Heavy Bomber wing in US 9th Air Force with 178 (Halifax/Liberator) and 462 (RAAF) (Halifax) Sqns; January 1944: under RAF Middle East with 178 (Liberator) and 462 (RAAF) (Halifax) Sqns; April 1945: in 205 Group MASAF with 178 Sqn (Liberator VI)
No. 241 Wing RAF			
No. 242 Wing RAF			October 1942: Heavy Bomber Wing in 205 Group in Egypt with 160 Squadron (Liberator)
No. 243 Wing RAF			May 1942: Fighter Wing in 211 Group WDAF at Gambut with 33 Squadron and 274 Squadrons (Hurricane IIA/B), 80 Squadron (Hurricane IIC) and 143 Squadron (from June) (Spitfire VC) September 1942: 33, 73 and 213 Squadrons (Hurricane IIC), 145 and 601 Squadrons (Spitfire VC) October 1942: 212 Group WDAF with 80 (Hurricane IIC), 127 and 335 (Greek) (Hurricane IIB) and 274 (Hurricane IIE) Squadrons
No. 244 Wing RAF			September 1942: Fighter Wing in 211 Group WDAF at Amiriya with 1 (SAAF) and 238 Squadrons (Hurricane IIB), 80 Squadron (Hurricane IIC) and 92 Squadron (Spitfire VB/C); October 1942: 73 (Hurricane IIC), 92 (Spitfire VB/C), 145, 601 (Spitfire VB) Squadrons; September 1943: in DAF with 1 (SAAF), 91, 145, 417 (RCAF) and 601 Sqns (Spitfire); January 1944: under US 64th Fighter Wing with 80, 92, 145, 241, 274, 417 (RCAF) and 601 Sqns (Spitfire); April 1945: in DAF with 91, 145, 417 (RCAF) Sqns (Spitfire VIII), 241 Sqn (Spitfire VIII/IX), and 601 Sqn (Spitfire IX)
No. 245 Wing RAF			October 1942: Bomber Wing in 205 Group in Egypt with 14 (Boston III/Marauder), 462 (RAAF) (Halifax) Squadrons; September 1943: in Air Defences, Eastern Mediterranean, with 1 General Reconnaissance Unit (1 Flt) (Wellington); January 1944: in 201 Group under RAF Middle East with 1 GRU (Wellington) and 252 Sqn (Beaufighter), detachment under Allied HQ Levant, with 17 (SAAF) (Ventura) and Picardy (Free French) (Blenheim/Vengeance) Sqns
No. 246 Wing RAF			October 1942: Fighter-Bomber Wing in 207 Group in East Africa with 41 (SAAF) Squadron (Hurricane IIB and Hartebeest); September 1943 and January 1944: Reconnaissance Wing in East Africa with 209, 259, 262 (Catalina) and 230 (Sunderland) Sqns; April 1945: under Air HQ, East Africa, with 259 Sqn (Sunderland V/Catalina I/IB)
No. 247 Wing RAF			October 1942: Torpedo Bomber/Reconnaissance Wing under 201 Group in Egypt with 38 (Wellington IC/VIII), 203 (Baltimore) and 252 (Beaufighter) Sqns; September 1943: in Air Defences, Eastern Mediterranean, with 38 (Wellington) 203 (Baltimore) and 252 (Beaufighter) Sqns; January 1944: in 201 Group under RAF Middle East with 16 (SAAF) and 227 (Beaufighter), 38 (Wellington) and 454 (RAAF) (Baltimore) Sqns
No. 248 Wing RAF			October 1942: Torpedo Bomber Wing under 201 Group in Egypt 38 and 221 Squadrons (Wellington IC/VIII), 39 Squadron (Beaufort) and 203 Squadron (Blenheim IV, Bisley, Baltimore I/II/III, Maryland); September 1943: in Malta with 69 (Baltimore) and 221 (Wellington) Sqns
No. 249 Wing RAF			September 1943: in 216 Group, Middle East Air Command, with 117 (Dakota), 162 (Wellington/Bisley) and 28 (SAAF) (Dakota/Anson/Wellington) Sqns; January 1944: in 216 Group, RAF Middle East, with 216 and 267 Sqns (Dakota); April 1945: in 216 Ferry and Air Transport Group RAF, Mediterranean Allied Air Forces (MAAF), with 44 (SAAF) (Air Ambulance) (Dakota/Anson/Expeditor)
No. 250 Wing RAF			November 1941: in 202 Group at Ismailia with 1 GRU (Wellington I/IC) and 73 Squadron (Hurricane I) at Port Said October 1942: in Egypt with 89 (Beaufighter) and 94 (Hurricane IIC and Spitfire VC) Squadrons
No. 251 Wing RAF			
No. 252 Wing RAF			November 1941: in 202 Group at Alexandria, with 213 Squadron (Heliopolis) and part of 73 Squadron (Hurricane I) October 1942: in Egypt with 46 (Beaufighter) and 417 (RCAF) (Hurricane IIC and Spitfire VC) Squadrons
No. 253 Wing RAF			Until November 1941: Army Cooperation Wing in WDAF at Ghot Wahas with 208, 237 (Rhodesian) and 451 (RAAF) Squadrons (Hurricane I); April 1945: in DAF with 15 (SAAF), 454 (RAAF) and 500 Sqns (Baltimore)
No. 254 Wing RAF			July 1944: in Balkan Air Force (BAF) at Termoli with 39 (Beaufighter TF X), 213 (Mustang III) and 13 (Greek) (Baltimore IV/V) Squadrons; April 1945: in BAF with 25 (SAAF) and 30 Sqns (Marauder III), 28 and 132 Italian Co-Belligerent Air Force (ItAF) Sqns (Baltimore IV/V)
No. 255 Wing RAF			
No. 256 Wing RAF			
No. 257 Wing RAF			
No. 258 Wing RAF			November 1941: Fighter Wing in WDAF with 2 (SAAF), 3 (RAAF), 4 (SAAF), 112 and 250 Squadrons (Tomahawk); September 1943 and January 1944: Reconnaissance Wing in East Africa with 265 Sqn (Catalina); April 1945: under Air HQ, East Africa, with 265 Sqn (Catalina I/IB)
No. 259 Wing RAF			November 1941: at Nicosia with 213 Squadron (Hurricane I) and 815 Squadron Fleet Air Arm at Lakatamia; September 1943: in Air Defences, Eastern Mediterranean, with 46 (Beaufighter) and 208 (Hurricane) Sqns; January 1944: Fighter Reconnaissance Wing in Cyprus under Allied HQ Levant, with 208 Sqn (Hurricane/Spitfire)
No. 260 Wing RAF			
No. 261 Wing RAF			
No. 262 Wing RAF			November 1941: Fighter Wing in WDAF with 1 (SAAF), 94, 229, 238, 260 and 274 Squadrons (Hurricane I)
No. 263 Wing RAF			November 1941: at Beirut with 335 (Greek) Squadron in Palestine (Hurricane I), a Free French squadron in Lebanon (Morane 406) and a Free French flight in Syria (Blenheim IV); January 1944: in Air Defences, Eastern Mediterranean, with 55 Sqn (Baltimore)
No. 264 Wing RAF			
No. 265 Wing RAF			
No. 266 Wing RAF			
No. 267 Wing RAF			
No. 268 Wing RAF			
No. 269 Wing RAF			November 1941: Fighter Wing in WDAF at Sidi Haniesh, with 30 and RN(F) (FAA) Squadrons (Hurricane I/IIA/B)
No. 270 Wing RAF			November 1941: Light Bomber Wing in WDAF at Fuka with 8 (detachment), 45 and 55 Squadrons at Fuka, 14 and 84 Squadrons at Maaten Bagush, and 342 (Lorraine) (Free French) Squadron at Abu Sueir (Blenheim IV)
No. 272 Wing RAF			
No. 273 Wing RAF			
No. 274 Wing RAF			
No. 275 Wing RAF			
No. 276 Wing RAF			
No. 280 Wing RAF			
No. 281 Wing RAF			July 1944: Fighter Wing in Balkan Air Force at Termoli with 32 (Spitfire VC/B/VIII/IX), 249 (Spitfire VC) and 253 (Spitfire VC) Squadrons RAF, 102 (Macchi C.202) and 155 (Macchi C.205) Squadrons ItAF; April 1945: in BAF with 73 (Spitfire IX), 253 (Spitfire VIII/IX), 352 (Yugoslav) (Spitfire Vc), 6 and 351 (Yugoslav) (Hurricane IV) Sqns
No. 282 Wing RAF			April 1945: in 216 Ferry and Air Transport Group MAAF with 216 Sqn (Dakota/Anson/Expeditor)
No. 283 Wing RAF			October 1942: Transport Wing in 216 Group in East Africa with 163 Squadron (Hudson VI); April 1945: in BAF with 16 (SAAF), 19 (SAAF) (Beaufighter X), 213 (Mustang III/IV) and 249 (Mustang III) Sqns
No. 284 Wing RAF			January 1944: Transport Wing in 216 Group MAAF with 28 (SAAF) Sqn (Dakota/Anson); April 1945: in 216 Ferry and Air Transport Group MAAF with 28 (SAAF) Sqn (Dakota/Anson/Expeditor)
No. 285 Wing RAF			September 1942: Reconnaissance Wing in WDAF at Burg el Arab, with 2 PRU (Spitfire VB), 1437 Flight (Maryland and Baltimore) and 60 (SAAF) Squadron at Wadi Natrun (Maryland); joined in October by 208 and 40 (SAAF) Squadrons (Hurricane I/IIA/B); September 1943: in DAF with 40 (SAAF) and 225 Sqns (Spitfire), 1437 Flt (Mustang); January 1944: in DAF with 40 (SAAF) (Spitfire) and 600 (Beaufighter) Sqns; April 1945: in DAF with 40 (SAAF) (Spitfire IX) and 318 (Polish) (Spitfire V/IX) Sqns
No. 286 Wing RAF			(As Malta Wing) September 1943: 126, 185, 229, 249 Sqns and 1435 Flight (Spitfire); January 1944: in 242 Group, Mediterranean Allied Coastal Air Force (MACAF), with 14 Sqn (Marauder), 126, 249 Sqns and 1435 Flt (Spitfire), 255 and 416 (USAAF) Sqns (Beaufighter), and 608 (Hudson) Sqn
No. 287 Wing RAF			April 1945: in MACAF with 272 Sqn (Beaufighter X) and 1435 Flt (Spitfire IX)
No. 292 Wing RAF			
No. 293 Wing RAF			June 1943: at Calcutta in 221 Group with 136 (Hurricane) and 176 (Beaufighter) Sqns at Baigachi, 607 and 615 (Hurricane) Sqns at Alipore. December 1944: in Air Defence of Calcutta, EAC, with 69 (Beaufighter) and 615 (Spitfire) Sqns
No. 294 Wing RAF			
No. 295 Wing RAF			West Africa: 343 (Sunderland) and 344 (Wellington). Both were French-manned and both were actually Flottilles of the Aeronavale (Naval Air Service).
No. 296 Wing RAF			
No. 297 Wing RAF			
No. 298 Wing RAF			Included 26 Squadron SAAF

=== No. 300 Wing – No. 499 Wing ===
Wing	Date of establishment	Date of disestablishment	Notes
No. 300 Wing RAF			
No. 301 Wing RAF			
No. 302 Wing RAF			
No. 303 Wing RAF			
No. 321 Wing RAF			
No. 322 Wing RAF			November 1942: Mobile Wing in Eastern Air Command (North West Africa) at Maison Blanche with 81, 154 and 242 Squadrons (Spitfire VC), and 225 Squadron (Hurricane IIE); September 1943: in DAF covering Operation Baytown with 81, 151, 154, 232 and 242 Sqns (Spitfire); January 1944: in Air Defences, Eastern Mediterranean, with 154, 232 and 242 Sqns (Spitfire)
No. 323 Wing RAF			November 1942: Non-mobile Wing in EAC (NWA) at Maison Blanche with 43 and 253 Squadrons (Hurricane IIC) and 4 PRU (Spitfire PR IV); September 1943: in Northwest African Coastal Air Force (NACAF) with 32, 73, 253 (Spitfire), 87 (Hurricane/Spitfire) and 219 (Beaufighter) Sqns January 1944: in 242 Group MACAF with 73 Sqn (Spitfire); In May 1944, B Flight, 1st Emergency Rescue Squadron, USAAF, flying Consolidated OA-10 Catalinas, was attached to the wing for operations in Italy. April 1945: in MACAF with 38 (Wellington XIV) and 624 (Walrus) Sqns and ItAF Seaplane Wing (82°, 83°, 84°, 85° Gruppi) (CANT Z.501/506/RS 14)
No. 324 Wing RAF			November 1942: Mobile Wing in EAC (NWA) at Maison Blanche with 72, 93, 111 and 152 Squadrons (Spitfire VB) and 255 Squadron (Beaufighter VIF) September 1943: in DAF covering Operation Baytown with 43, 72, 93, 111, 243 (Spitfire) and 600 (BeaufighterVIF) Sqns; April 1945: in DAF with 42, 73, 93 Sqns (Spitfire IX)
No. 325 Wing RAF	14 September 1942	30 June 1943	Naval Co-operation wing November 1942: Mobile Wing in EAC (NWA) at Algiers with 32 and 87 Squadrons (Hurricane IIC), 232 and 243 Squadrons (Spitfire VB), 241 (Hurricane IIE) and 600 (Beaufighter VIF) Aqns
No. 325 Wing RAF	25 August 1943	12 August 1944	General Reconnaissance Wing in NACAF with 272 and 603 (Beaufighter), 608 (Hudson) and 614 (Bisley) Sqns; January 1944: in Malta with 52 (Baltimore) and 614 (Bisley) Sqns
No. 325 Wing RAF	1 April 2006	2013	Deployable Expeditionary Air Wing based at RAF Kinloss
No. 326 Wing RAF			November 1942: Semi-mobile Wing in EAC (NWA) at Blida with 13, 18, 114 and 614 Squadrons (Bisley)
No. 328 Wing RAF			November 1942: Non-mobile Wing in EAC (NWA) at Blida with 500 and 608 Squadrons (Hudson V), 700 (FAA) Squadron (Walrus) and 813 (FAA) Squadron (Swordfish); September 1943: in NACAF with 13 (Bisley), 14 (Marauder), 39, 47, 255 (Beaufighter), 52 (Baltimore) and 458 (RAAF) (Wellington) Sqns; January 1944: in US 63d Fighter Wing, with I/22 (French) (Marauder), 23 (Mosquito) and 500 (Hudson/Ventura) Sqns
No. 329 Wing RAF			
No. 330 Wing RAF			September 1943: in NASAF with 142 and 150 Squadrons (Wellington III/X); January 1944: in MASAF with 142 and 150 Sqns (Wellington X)
No. 331 Wing RAF			September 1943: in NASAF with 420, 424 and 425 Squadrons RCAF (Wellington X)
No. 332 Wing RAF			
No. 333 Wing RAF			January 1944: in Malta with 52 (Baltimore) and 614 (Bisley) Sqns
No. 334 Wing RAF			July 1944: Special Duties Wing in Balkan Air Force at Brindisi and Lecce with 148 Squadron RAF (Halifax II/V and Lysander), 1586 Polish Flight (Halifax II/IIA and Liberator III), and 1 and 88 ItAF Sqns (SM.82 and Cz 1007); April 1945: in BAF with 1 (SM.82) and 88 (Z.1007) ItAF Sqns, 148 (Halifax IV/V/Lysander IIIA) and 44 (SAAF) (Dakota) Sqns, and 16 (USAAF) Sqn (Dakota I/III)
No. 335 Wing RAF			January 1944: in Malta with 87 (Hurricane/Spitfire) and 272 (Beaufighter) Sqns
No. 336 Wing RAF			January 1944: in Mediterranean Allied Photographic Reconnaissance Wing, with 60 (SAAF) (Mosquito) and 683 (Spitfire) Sqns; April 1945: in MAAF with 681 and 683 Sqns (Spitfire PR IX/PR XIX), 60 (SAAF) and detachment 680 Sqn (Mosquito PR XVI)
No. 337 Wing RAF			January 1944: in MACAF, with I/5 and III/6 French (Airacobra) and 417 (USAAF) (Beaufighter) Sqns; April 1945: in Air HQ Greece, BAF, with 13 (Greek) (Baltimore V), 335 (Greek) and 336 (Greek) (Spitfire Vb/Vc), 252 (Beaufighter XC) and detachment 624 (Walrus) Sqns
No. 338 Wing RAF			January 1944: in MACAF with I/4 (Airacobra) and II/3 (Hurricane) French, 32 (Spitfire), 39 (Beaufighter X) and 153 (Beaufighter VIF) Sqns; April 1945: in MACAF with 237 (Rhodesian) (Spitfire IX) and 255 (Mosquito XIX) Sqns
No. 339 Wing RAF			
No. 340 Wing RAF			April 1945: in MACAF with II/6 and II/9 (French) (Airacobra), 2S French (Latécoère) and 4S (French) (Walrus) Sqns
No. 341 Wing RAF			June 1945: Transport Wing in 232 Group, RAF Burma, with 62, 194 and 267 Sqns (Dakota)
No. 342 Wing RAF			June 1945: Transport Wing in 232 Group, RAF Burma, with 31, 117 and 436 (RCAF) Sqns (Dakota)
No. 343 Wing RAF			
No. 344 Wing RAF			
No. 345 Wing RAF			June 1945: Transport Wing in 232 Group, RAF Burma, with 435 (RCAF) Sqn (Dakota)
No. 346 Wing RAF			June 1945: in 222 Group with 22 (Beaufighter), 230 (Sunderland), 136 (Spitfire) Sqns
No. 347 Wing RAF			June 1945: Photo Reconnaissance Wing in 231 Group, RAF Burma, with 681 (Spitfire) and 684 (Mosquito) Sqns
No. 348 Wing RAF			
No. 349 Wing RAF			
No. 350 Wing RAF			
No. 351 Wing RAF			

=== No. 500 Wing – No. 999 Wing ===
Wing	Date of establishment	Date of disestablishment	Notes
No. 500 Wing RAF			
No. 551 Wing RAF			Would have been part of Tiger Force, scheduled to be operational by 1 January 1946 at RAF Coningsby, as of August 1945. Formation does not seem to have been completed. Later served as part of Second Tactical Air Force at RAF Gutersloh in Germany in the mid-1950s.
No. 552 Wing RAF			
No. 553 Wing RAF			
No. 554 Wing RAF			
No. 700 Wing RAF			
No. 701 Wing RAF			
No. 900 Wing RAF			
No. 901 Wing RAF	1 October 1944	December 1945	December 1944: Tactical Wing at Chiringa, India, in 224 Group 3rd Tactical Air Force (3 TAF), with 27, 177, and 211 Sqns (Beaufighter) June 1945: Non-operational in 224 Group with 45, 82, 84 (Mosquito) and 211 (Beaufighter) Sqns; November 1945: at St. Thomas Mount
No. 901 Wing RAF	1 April 2006		Expeditionary Air Wing deployed to Middle East within No 83 Expeditionary Air Group
No. 902 Wing RAF	1 December 1944		Tactical Wing formed from 166 (Tactical) Wing; December 1944: at Chittagong in 224 Group EAC with 9 (RIAF) (Hurricane), 39 and 135 (Thunderbolt), and 459 USAAF (Lightning) Sqns June 1945: Non-operational in 224 Group with 11 Sqn (Hurricane); October 1945: at Tengah in RAF Malaya with 152 and 155 Sqns (Spitfire)
No. 902 Wing RAF	1 April 2006		Expeditionary Air Wing deployed to Middle East within No 83 Expeditionary Air Group
No. 903 Wing RAF	1 December 1944	31 October 1945	Tactical Wing formed at Patenga in 224 Group, 3 TAF December 1944: temporarily at Comilla with 67 Sqn (Spitfire); October 1945: at Kallang in RAF Malaya with 31 Sqn (Dakota)
No. 903 Wing RAF	2003	2009	Expeditionary Air Wing at Contingency Operating Base Basra/Basra Airport, Iraq for Operation Telic
No. 903 Wing RAF	2009	2014	Expeditionary Air Wing at Camp Bastion, Helmand Province, Afghanistan for Operation Herrick
No. 903 Wing RAF	14 December 2014		Expeditionary Air Wing at RAF Akrotiri, Cyprus in support of Operation Shader
No. 904 Wing RAF			December 1944: at Cox's Bazar in 224 Group EAC with 2 (RIAF) and 4 (RIAF) Sqns (Hurricane) and 237 Sqn (Spitfire) June 1945: Non-operational in 224 Group with 134 and 258 Sqns (Thunderbolt); December 1945: at Batavia with 60 and 81 Sqns (Thunderbolt), 84 and detachments 47 and 110 Sqns (Mosquito), detachment 681 (Spitfire PR), 155 (Spitfire), 31 (Dakota) and 656 (AOP) (Auster) Sqns
No. 904 Wing RAF	2006	2015	Expeditionary Air Wing at Kandahar Airfield, Afghanistan for Operation Herrick
No. 905 Wing RAF	November 1944	31 October 1945	December 1944: at Jalia, India, in 224 Group, EAC with 134 and 258 Sqns (Thunderbolt) June 1945: Non-operational in 224 Group with 5, 30, 123 and 135 Sqns (Thunderbolt); October 1945: at Kuala Lumpur in RAF Malaya with 60, 81, 131, 258 (Thunderbolt) and 656 (AOP) (Auster) Sqns
No. 905 Wing RAF	1 April 2006		Expeditionary Air Wing at RAF Mount Pleasant Falkland Islands
No. 906 Wing RAF	1 December 1944	13 November 1945	Tactical Wing formed at Tulihal from 170 (Bomber) Wing; December 1944: at Imphal in 221 Group EAC with 1 (RIAF), 42 and 60 Sqns (Hurricane) June 1945: in 221 Group, RAF Burma, with 28 (Hurricane), 176 (Beaufighter), 273 and 607 (Spitfire) Sqns
No. 906 Wing RAF	2011	2011	Expeditionary Air Wing at Gioia del Colle Air Base, Italy in support of Operation Ellamy
No. 906 Wing RAF	15 January 2013		Expeditionary Air Wing at Al Minhad Air Base, United Arab Emirates
No. 907 Wing RAF			December 1944: at Tamu in 221 Group EAC with 11 (Hurricane) and 152 (Spitfire) Sqns June 1945: Non-operational in 224 Group with 20 Sqn (Hurricane)
No. 907 Wing RAF	2011	2011	Expeditionary Air Wing at RAF Akrotiri in support of Operation Ellamy
No. 908 Wing RAF			December 1944: at Kumbhirgram in 221 Group EAC with 43 Sqn (Mosquito) June 1945: in 221 Group, RAF Burma, with 47 and 110 Sqns (Mosquito)
No. 909 Wing RAF			December 1944: at Pallel in 221 Group EAC with 17, 153 and 607 Sqns (Spitfire), 34 and 113 Sqns (Hurricane) June 1945: in 221 Group, RAF Burma, with 152 and 155 Sqns (Spitfire)
No. 910 Wing RAF			December 1944: at Wangjing in 221 Group EAC with 79, 146 and 261 Sqns (Thunderbolt) June 1945: in 221 Group, RAF Burma, with 34, 42, 79 and 113 Sqns (Thunderbolts)

== Expeditionary Air Wings ==
Formed on 1 April 2006, Expeditionary Air Wings (EAW) are established at the following RAF Flying Stations:

- RAF Waddington – 34 EAW (ISTAR)
- RAF Brize Norton – 38 EAW (Air Transport)
- RAF Coningsby – 121 EAW (Fighter)
- RAF Leeming – 135 EAW
- RAF Marham – 138 EAW (Ground Attack)
- RAF Lossiemouth – 140 EAW

=== Deployed EAWs ===
- No. 901 EAW – Deployed to Middle East
- No. 902 EAW – Deployed to Middle East
- No. 903 EAW – RAF Akrotiri
- No. 905 EAW – RAF Mount Pleasant, Falkland Islands
- No. 906 EAW – Al Minhad Air Base, United Arab Emirates since 15 January 2013

=== Disbanded EAWs ===
- 122 EAW – RAF Cottesmore
- 125 EAW – RAF Leuchars
- 904 EAW – Kandahar Airfield, Afghanistan – stood down December 2014
- 907 EAW – RAF Akrotiri

== Force Protection wings ==
Formed from RAF Regiment field squadrons and RAF Police components, Force Protection (FP) Wings are responsible for defending aircraft and personnel whilst deployed on operations. the overarching Combat Readiness Force HQ is located at RAF Honington. Each Wing is parented by an RAF Station with whom it is usually deployed:

- No 2 Force Protection Wing – RAF Leeming
- No 3 Force Protection Wing – RAF Marham
- No 5 Force Protection Wing – RAF Lossiemouth
- No 7 Force Protection Wing – RAF Coningsby
- No. 20 Wing RAF Regiment – RAF Honington
- RAF Force Protection Centre – RAF Honington
- RAF Regiment Training Wing – RAF Honington

=== Disbanded FPWs ===
RAF Force Protection Wings were, until April 2004, known as Tactical Survive To Operate Headquarters (Tac STO HQs).

- No 4 Force Protection Wing – RAF Brize Norton
- No 8 Force Protection Wing – RAF Waddington

== Miscellaneous wings ==
- No 1 Air Mobility Wing – RAF Brize Norton – HQ Squadron, 44 Mobile Air Movements Squadron and 45 Mobile Air Movements Squadron. This is UK Mobile Air Movements Squadron (UKMAMS) expanded to wing strength.
- No. 42 (Expeditionary Support) Wing – RAF Wittering
- No. 85 (Expeditionary Logistics) Wing – RAF Wittering
- No. 1 Intelligence, Surveillance and Reconnaissance (ISR) Wing – RAF Waddington
- ISTAR Air Wing – RAF Waddington
- 2nd Tactical Air Force Communication Wing RAF - formed 31 March 1945; disbanded 15 July 1945 at RAF Buckeburg. Became British Air Forces of Occupation Communication Squadron.

== Station-based wings ==
A typical Royal Air Force flying station (not training) will have the following integrated wing-based structure:

- Administrative Wing / Base (Station) Support Wing / Support Wing
- Depth Support Wing
- Forward Support Wing
- Operations Wing

On a smaller RAF Station, these functions may be termed squadrons but their role is identical.

== Specialised station-based wings ==
Some stations has Wings which are customised to their particular role with the RAF:

- Airport of Embarkation Wing – RAF Brize Norton

== Tactical wings ==
Wings termed 'Tactical' within the Royal Air Force provide are cohesive, specialised teams.

- Tactical Communications Wing – RAF Leeming
- Tactical Medical Wing – RAF Brize Norton – This unit has the Latin motto "Summum Bonum" which means 'for the highest good'. It became operational on 1 April 1996 and its CO is currently Wing Commander Alan Cranfield. Some of its sub-units are Aeromedical Evacuation Squadron, Deployable Aeromedical Response Teams (DARTS), Operational Training Squadron and Operations and Logistics Squadron.
- Tactical Provost Wing – RAF Honington
- Tactical Supply Wing – MOD Stafford

=== Disbanded ===
Tactical Imagery-Intelligence Wing – RAF Marham – Disbanded, merged to become No. 1 Intelligence, Surveillance, and Reconnaissance Wing RAF based at RAF Waddington

== Airfield Headquarters ==
Airfield Headquarters were a temporary form of a wing formation used between 1943 & 1944.

airfield HQ	formed on	formed at	disbanded on	disbanded at	became	notes
121	22 February 1943	RAF Wrexham	12 May 1944	RAF Holmsley South	No. 121 (Rocket Projectile) Wing RAF	
122	15 February 1943	RAF Zeals	12 May 1944	RAF Funtington	No. 122 (Rocket Projectile) Wing RAF	
123	1 April 1943	RAF Stoney Cross	12 May 1944	RAF Thorney Island	No. 123 (Rocket Projectile) Wing RAF	
124	1 April 1943	RAF Lasham	12 May 1944	RAF Hurn	No. 124 (Rocket Projectile) Wing RAF	
125	24 June 1943	RAF Gravesend	12 May 1944	RAF Ford	No. 125 (Fighter) Wing RAF	
126	4 July 1943	RAF Redhill	12 May 1944	RAF Tangmere	No. 126 (RCAF) (Fighter) Wing RAF	
127	4 July 1943	RAF Kenley	12 May 1944	RAF Tangmere	No. 127 (RCAF) (Fighter) Wing RAF	
128	4 July 1943	RAF Dunsfold	12 May 1944	RAF Odiham	No. 128 (RCAF) (Fighter) Wing RAF	
129	4 July 1943	RAF Gatwick	12 May 1944	RAF Westhampnett	No. 129 (Fighter Bomber) Wing RAF	
130	10 July 1943	RAF Gravesend	12 May 1944	RAF Gatwick	No. 130 (Reconnaissance) Wing RAF	
131 (Polish)	4 October 1943	RAF Northolt	12 May 1944	RAF Selsey	No. 131 (Polish) (Fighter) Wing RAF	
132 (Norwegian)	1 November 1943	RAF North Weald	12 May 1944	RAF Bognor	No. 132 (Norwegian) (Fighter) Wing RAF	
133 (Polish)	1 November 1943	RAF Heston	12 May 1944	RAF Coolham	No. 133 (Polish) (Fighter) Wing RAF	
134 (Czech)	8 November 1943	RAF Ibsley	12 May 1944	RAF Appledram	No. 134 (Czech) (Fighter) Wing RAF	
135	15 November 1943	RAF Hornchurch	12 May 1944	RAF Chailey	No. 135 (Fighter) Wing RAF	
136	22 November 1943	RAF Fairlop	12 May 1944	RAF Thorney Island	No. 136 (Fighter) Wing RAF	
137	14 November 1943	RAF Hartford Bridge	12 May 1944	RAF Hartford Bridge	No. 137 (Bomber) Wing RAF	
138	10 November 1943	RAF Lasham	12 May 1944	RAF Lasham	No. 138 (Bomber) Wing RAF	
139	17 November 1943	RAF Dunsfold	12 May 1944	RAF Dunsfold	No. 139 (Bomber) Wing RAF	
140	1 December 1943	RAF Sculthorpe	12 May 1944	RAF Gravesend	No. 140 (Bomber) Wing RAF	
141	1 January 1944	RAF Church Fenton	12 May 1944	RAF Hartford Bridge	No. 131 (Fighter) Wing RAF	
142	1 January 1944	RAF Scorton	12 May 1944	RAF Horne	No. 142 (Fighter) Wing RAF	
143 (RCAF)	10 January 1944	RAF Ayr	12 May 1944	RAF Hurn	No. 143 (RCAF) (Fighter) Wing RAF	
144 (RCAF)	1 February 1944	RAF Digby	12 May 1944	RAF Funtington	No. 144 (RCAF) (Fighter) Wing RAF	
145 (French)	1 February 1944	RAF Perranporth	12 May 1944	RAF Merston	No. 145 (French) (Fighter) Wing RAF	
146	31 January 1944	RAF Tangmere	12 May 1944	RAF Needs Oar Point	No. 146 (Fighter) Wing RAF	
147	16 February 1944	RAF Acklington	12 May 1944	RAF Zeals	No. 147 (Night Fighter) Wing RAF	
148	23 February 1944	RAF Drem	12 May 1944	RAF West Malling	No. 148 (Night Fighter) Wing RAF	
149	1 March 1944	RAF Castle Camps	12 May 1944	RAF Deanland	No. 149 (Long Range Fighter) Wing RAF	
150	8 March 1944	RAF Bradwell Bay	12 May 1944	RAF Newchurch	No. 150 (Fighter) Wing RAF	

== See also ==
Royal Air Force

- List of Royal Air Force aircraft squadrons
- List of Royal Air Force aircraft independent flights
- List of conversion units of the Royal Air Force
- List of Royal Air Force Glider units
- List of Royal Air Force Operational Training Units
- List of Royal Air Force schools
- List of Royal Air Force units & establishments
- List of RAF squadron codes
- List of RAF Regiment units
- List of Battle of Britain squadrons
- Royal Air Force roundels

Army Air Corps

- List of Army Air Corps aircraft units

Fleet Air Arm

- List of Fleet Air Arm aircraft squadrons
- List of Fleet Air Arm groups
- List of aircraft units of the Royal Navy
- List of aircraft wings of the Royal Navy

Others

- List of Air Training Corps squadrons
- University Air Squadron
- Air Experience Flight
- Volunteer Gliding Squadron
- United Kingdom military aircraft registration number
- United Kingdom aircraft test serials
- British military aircraft designation systems
