= No. 19 Sector RAF =

No. 19 (Fighter) Sector RAF 19th Training Wing RFC No. 19 (Fighter) Wing RAF
- Active: 1916-19; 1943-44; 1944
- Country: United Kingdom
- Branch: Royal Flying Corps; Royal Air Force
- Type: Sector; Previously Wing

No. 19 Sector RAF is a former Royal Air Force Sector that was operational during both the First and the Second World Wars.

== First World War ==
19th (Training) Wing RFC was formed on 1 May 1916 from 8th Wing in Newcastle-on-Tyne controlling Catterick Aerodrome, Cramlington Aerodrome, Montrose Aerodrome, Stirling Aerodrome and Turnhouse Aerodrome. It was under the command of Northern Group Command from 10 January 1917, moving to 17th Group RAF on 1 April 1918. It was disbanded on 25 March 1919 while under the command of 16th Group RAF.

== Second World War ==
No. 19 (Fighter) Wing RAF was formed during December 1943 at RAF North Weald within No. 84 Group RAF controlling:

- No. 132 Airfield Headquarters RAF
- No. 134 Airfield Headquarters RAF
- No. 145 Airfield Headquarters RAF (from 20 April 1944)

The wing was disbanded on 12 May 1944.

No. 19 (Fighter) Sector was formed on 12 May 1944 at RAF Appledram controlling:

- No. 132 Wing RAF
- No. 134 Wing RAF
- No. 144 Wing RAF

The sector disbanded at RAF Hurn on 12 July 1944.

== See also ==
- List of wings of the Royal Air Force
