= No. 23 Wing RAF =

No. 23 Wing RAF 23rd (Training) Wing RFC No. 23 Wing Servicing Unit RAF No. 23 (Fighter) Wing RAF
- Active: 1916-19; 1940; 1941; 1944
- Country: United Kingdom
- Branch: Royal Flying Corps; Royal Air Force
- Type: Wing

No. 23 Wing RAF is a former Royal Air Force wing that was operational during the First and the Second World Wars.

== First World War ==
23rd (Training) Wing RFC was formed on 13 November 1916 at South Carlton Aerodrome to control Scampton Aerodrome, South Carlton, Waddington Aerodrome and Doncaster Aerodrome. It joined Northern Group Command on 10 January 1917, transferring to No. 12 Group RAF on 1 April 1918 and to 16th Group RAF in March 1919 before being disbanded on 31 May 1919.

== Second World War ==
No. 23 Wing Servicing Unit RAF was disbanded at RAF Henlow on 24 June 1940. It was reformed in Northern Ireland and was disbanded during December 1941

No. 23 (Fighter) Wing RAF was formed on 20 January 1944 under No. 84 Group RAF at RAF Tangmere it controlled:

- No. 135 Airfield Headquarters RAF
- No. 145 Airfield Headquarters RAF
- No. 146 Airfield Headquarters RAF (from 1 March 1944)

The wing was disbanded still at RAF Tangmere on 20 April 1944.

== See also ==
- List of wings of the Royal Air Force
