= No. 141 Wing RAF =

No. 141 Wing RAF No. 141 (Fighter Bomber) Wing RAF No. 141 (Fighter) Wing RAF No. 141 Airfield Headquarters RAF
- Active: 1944; 1944; 1944-45
- Country: United Kingdom
- Branch: Royal Air Force
- Size: Wing
- Last base: B.80 Volkel

No. 141 Wing RAF is a former Royal Air Force wing that was operational during the Second World War.

The unit was previously No. 141 Airfield Headquarters RAF during 1944.

== History ==
No. 141 Airfield Headquarters was formed on 1 January 1944 at RAF Church Fenton within No. 85 Group RAF. It consisted of:

- No. 124 (Baroda) Squadron RAF (arrived 18 March 1944, departed 24 April 1944) with Supermarine Spitfire VIIs
- No. 234 (Madras Presidency) Squadron RAF (departed 28 January 1944) with Spitfire VBs
- No. 264 (Madras Presidency) Squadron RAF with de Havilland Mosquito XIIIs
- No. 322 (Dutch) Squadron RAF (arrived 23 April 1944) with Spitfire VB, VC & XIVs
- No. 410 Squadron RCAF (arrived 28 April 1944) with Mosquito XIIIs
- No. 604 Squadron AAF (arrived 25 April 1944, departed 2 May 1944) with Mosquito XII & XIIIs

The unit was disbanded on 12 May 1944 and became No. 141 Wing while at RAF Hartford Bridge.

No. 141 (Fighter) Wing RAF was formed within No. 85 Group RAF, RAF Second Tactical Air Force on 12 May 1944 still at Hartford Bridge, consisting of:

- No. 91 (Nigeria) Squadron RAF (arrived 19 June 1944) with Spitfire XIV & IXBs
- No. 264 (Madras Presidency) Squadron RAF (departed 19 June 1944) with Mosquito XIIIs
- No. 322 (Dutch) Squadron RAF (departed 19 June 1944) with Spitfire XIVs
- No. 345 (GC II/2 'Berry') Squadron RAF (arrived 16 August 1944, departed 1 November 1944) with Spitfire VB & HF IXs
- No. 410 Squadron RCAF (departed 18 June 1944) with Mosquito XIIIs

still with Spitfires. The wing was moved to Air Defence of Great Britain control on 5 October 1944. The wing moved to RAF Deanland on 21 July 1944, moving to RAF Biggin Hill on 18 October 1944. The wing disbanded into No. 136 Wing RAF on 5 November 1944.

No. 141 (Fighter Bomber) Wing RAF was reformed on 25 November 1944 at RAF Hartford Bridge within No. 2 Group RAF, 2 TAF consisting of:

- No. 418 Squadron RCAF with Mosquito VIs
- No. 615 Squadron AAF with Spitfire VIIIs

The wing was moved to France on 15 March 1945 to B.71 Coxyde then to B.80 Volkel on 28 April 1945 and was disbanded on 31 August 1945 still at B.80 Volkel.

== See also ==
- List of Wings of the Royal Air Force
