= No. 25 Sector RAF =

No. 25 (Base Defence) Sector RAF 25th (Training) Wing RFC No. 25 (Base) Defence Wing RAF
- Active: 1916-18; 1944; 1944-45
- Country: United Kingdom
- Branch: Royal Flying Corps; Royal Air Force
- Type: Sector; Previously Wing

No. 25 Sector RAF is a former Royal Air Force Sector that was operational during both the First and the Second World Wars.

== First World War ==
25th (Training) Wing RFC was formed on 18 September 1916 at Castle Bromwich Aerodrome, it joined Southern Group Command on 10 January 1917. The wing controlled Castle Bromwich, Lilbourne Aerodrome & Tern Hill Aerodrome and was transferred to Western Group Command on 26 September 1917 then on 1 April 1918 it was transferred 13th Group RAF and disbanded on 1 July 1918.

== Second World War ==
No. 25 (Base) Defence Wing RAF was formed on 1 March 1944 within No. 11 Group RAF at RAF Castle Camps it controlled:

- No. 149 Airfield Headquarters RAF
- No. 150 Airfield Headquarters RAF

It moved to RAF Hornchurch during April 1944, then to RAF Martlesham Heath on 2 May 1944. It was disbanded on 12 May 1944.

No. 25 (Base Defence) Sector RAF was formed on 12 May 1944 at RAF Hornchurch controlling No. 150 Wing RAF. The sector landed on Utah Beach on 28 August 1944, moving to Vannes then Everburg before disbanding on 16 March 1945 and becoming No. 85 Group Operation Room.

== See also ==
- List of wings of the Royal Air Force
