= No. 130 Wing RAF =

No. 130 Wing RAF No. 130 Airfield Headquarters RAF No. 130 (Reconnaissance) Wing RAF
- Active: 1943-44; 1944; 1945
- Country: United Kingdom
- Branch: Royal Air Force
- Type: Wing
- Last base: RAF Dunsfold

No. 130 Wing RAF is a former Royal Air Force wing that was operational during the Second World War.

== Second World War ==
No. 130 (Reconnaissance) Wing RAF was formed on 12 May 1944 at RAF Odiham within No. 84 Group RAF, RAF Second Tactical Air Force with No. 2 Squadron RAF, No. 4 Squadron RAF and No. 268 Squadron RAF. It was merged into No. 35 Wing RAF on 7 July 1944.

No. 130 Wing RAF was reformed on 7 May 1945 at RAF Turnhouse within No. 88 Group RAF for Operation Apostle controlling RAF units in Trøndelag. This included No. 129 (Mysore) Squadron RAF and No. 165 (Ceylon) Squadron RAF, the wing moved to Oslo Airport on 5 June 1945 before moving to RAF Dunsfold on 14 November 1945, with the wing being disbanded on 15 December 1945.

== History of No. 130 Airfield Headquarters ==
The unit was formed on 10 July 1943 at RAF Gravesend within No. 35 Wing RAF, it moved to RAF Odiham on 7 August 1943, RAF North Weald on 15 November 1943, RAF Sawbridgeworth on 29 February 1944 and finally RAF Gatwick on 4 April 1944. The unit was disbanded on 12 May 1944 to become No. 130 (Reconnaissance) Wing RAF.

Squadrons controlled:

- No. 331 (Norwegian) Squadron RAF (10 July 1943 to 12 May 1944)
- No. 332 (Norwegian) Squadron RAF (10 July 1943 to 12 May 1944)
- No. 268 Squadron RAF (15 September 1943 to 15 October 1943)
- No. 2 Squadron RAF (15 November 1943 to 30 November 1943)
- No. 4 Squadron RAF (15 November 1943 to 30 November 1943) (3 January 1944 to 12 May 1944)
- No. 63 Squadron RAF (30 November 1943 to 12 May 1944)
- No. 168 Squadron RAF (30 November 1943 to 21 February 1944)

== See also ==
- List of wings of the Royal Air Force
