= RAF wings =

RAF wings may refer to:

- The aircrew badge worn by pilots and other aircrew. See Aircrew brevet#United Kingdom.
- The formations formed of several squadrons which are either part of a group or a station. See List of wings of the Royal Air Force.
