= No. 20 Sector RAF =

No. 20 (Fighter) Sector RAF 20th (Reserve) Wing RFC 20th (Training) Wing RFC No. 2062 Wing Servicing Unit RAF No. 20 (Fighter) Wing RAF
- Active: 1916-19; 1940; 1943-44; 1944
- Country: United Kingdom
- Branch: Royal Flying Corps; Royal Air Force
- Type: Sector; Previously Wing

No. 20 Sector RAF is a former Royal Air Force Sector that was operational during both the First and the Second World Wars.

== First World War ==
20th (Reserve) Wing RFC was formed on 25 July 1916 under the Middle East Brigade at Aboukir. The wing was renamed to 20th (Training) Wing RFC on 31 May 1917 and was disbanded two years later on 22 July 1919.

== Second World War ==
No. 2062 Wing Servicing Wing was active until 24 June 1940 at RAF Cosford where it was disbanded.

No. 20 (Fighter) Wing RAF was formed during December 1943 at RAF Hornchurch within No. 84 Group RAF controlling:

- No. 123 Wing RAF (from 10 March 1944)
- No. 135 Airfield Headquarters RAF (until 1 March 1944)
- No. 136 Airfield Headquarters RAF
- No. 146 Airfield Headquarters RAF (from 20 April 1944)

The wing moved to RAF Thorney Island on 9 April 1944 and was disbanded on 12 May 1944.

No. 20 (Fighter) Sector was formed on 12 May 1944 at RAF Thorney Island controlling:

- No. 123 Wing RAF
- No. 136 Wing RAF
- No. 146 Wing RAF

The sector disbanded still at Thorney Island on 12 July 1944.

== See also ==
- List of wings of the Royal Air Force
