= TPW =

TPW or TP&W may refer to:

- Tactical Provost Wing or Tactical Police Squadron, a unit of the British Royal Air Force Police
- Tampines West MRT station, Singapore, MRT station abbreviation TPW
- Texas Parks and Wildlife Department
- Texas Press Women, former name of Press Women of Texas, organisation of journalists
- Tokyo Pro Wrestling
- Toledo, Peoria and Western Railway
- Total precipitable water
