= No. 128 Wing RAF =

No. 128 Wing RAF No. 128 Airfield Headquarters RAF No. 128 (Fighter) (RCAF) Wing RAF No. 128 (Reconnaissance) Wing RAF No. 128 (Tactical) Wing RAF
- Active: 1943-44; 1944; 1945; 1954-55
- Country: United Kingdom
- Branch: Royal Air Force
- Type: Wing
- Last base: RAF Habbaniya

No. 128 Wing RAF is a former Royal Air Force wing that was operational during both the Second World War and the Cold War.

== Second World War ==
No. 128 (RCAF) (Fighter) Wing RAF was formed on 12 May 1944 in No. 83 Group RAF, RAF Second Tactical Air Force at RAF Odiham with No. 400 Squadron RCAF, No. 414 Squadron RCAF, No. 430 Squadron RCAF. The wing moved to B.8 Sommervieu on 29 June 1944 and was merged into No. 39 Wing RCAF on 1 July 1944.

No. 128 (Reconnaissance) Wing RAF was formed on 7 May 1945 at RAF North Weald within No. 88 Group RAF controlling units deployed near Oslo as part of Operation Doomsday. The wing moved to RAF Dyce on 14 May 1945 then to Oslo/Gardermoen on 22 May 1945 controlling No. 331 (Norwegian) Squadron RAF, No. 332 (Norwegian) Squadron RAF, No. 334 (Norwegian) Squadron RAF and No. 333 (Norwegian) Squadron RAF at Oslo/Fornebu. On 14 November 1945 the wing moved to RAF Dunsfold and was disbanded there on 12 December 1945.

== History of No. 128 Airfield Headquarters ==
The unit was formed on 4 July 1943 at RAF Dunsfold under No. 39 Wing RCAF. It moved to RAF Woodchurch on 28 July 1943, RAF Redhill on 1 October 1943 and RAF Odiham on 19 February 1944 where the unit was disbanded on 12 May 1944.

Squadrons controlled:

- No. 231 Squadron RAF (4 July 1943 to 15 January 1944)
- No. 400 Squadron RCAF (4 July 1943 to 12 May 1944)
- No. 168 Squadron RAF (21 February 1944 to 12 May 1944)

== Cold War ==
No. 128 (Tactical) Wing RAF was formed on 4 March 1954 at RAF Habbaniya under AHQ Iraq controlling No. 6 Squadron RAF and No. 73 Squadron RAF, both operating de Havilland Venoms. It was disbanded on 31 October 1955.

== See also ==
- List of wings of the Royal Air Force
