= RAF Selsey =

Former RAF station in West Sussex, England

RAF Selsey
- Selsey, West Sussex in England

Site information
- Type: Advanced Landing Ground
- Code: ZS
- Owner: Air Ministry
- Operator: Royal Air Force
- Controlled by: Second Tactical Air Force * No. 83 Group RAF * No. 84 Group RAF

Location
- Shown within West Sussex RAF Selsey (the United Kingdom)
- Coordinates: 50°45′19″N 000°46′10″W

Site history
- Built: 1943
- Built by: RAF Airfield Construction Service
- In use: 1943-1945
- Battles/wars: European theatre of World War II

Airfield information
- Elevation: 20 feet (6 m) AMSL
Runways
Direction	Length and surface
NE/SW	1,280 metres (4,199 ft) Sommerfeld Tracking
SE/NW	1,189 metres (3,901 ft) Sommerfeld Tracking

Royal Air Force Selsey or more simply RAF Selsey is a former Royal Air Force Advanced Landing Ground located 2 miles (3.2 km) north east of Selsey, West Sussex and 5 miles (8.0 km) south of Chichester, West Sussex, England.

The following units were here at some point:

- No. 121 Airfield Headquarters RAF
  - No. 65 (East India) Squadron RAF (1943)
  - No. 245 (Northern Rhodesian) Squadron RAF (1943)
- No. 135 Airfield Headquarters RAF (renamed No. 135 (Fighter) Wing RAF on 15 May 1944)
  - No. 222 (Natal) Squadron RAF (1944)
  - No. 349 (Belgian) Squadron RAF (1944)
  - No. 485 Squadron RNZAF (1944)
- No. 145 (French) (Fighter) Wing RAF
  - No. 329 (GC I/2 'Cicognes') Squadron RAF (1944)
  - No. 340 (GC IV/2 Île-de-France) Squadron RAF (1944)
  - No. 341 (GC III/2 'Alsace') Squadron RAF (1944)
- No. 33 Squadron RAF (1944)
- No. 74 Squadron RAF (1944)
- No. 131 Airfield Headquarters (Polish) RAF (1944)
- No. 421 Repair & Salvage Unit
- No. 1316 Mobile Wing RAF Regiment
- No. 2731 Squadron RAF Regiment
- No. 2800 Squadron RAF Regiment
- No. 2955 Squadron RAF Regiment
