= No. 122 Expeditionary Air Wing =

No. 122 Expeditionary Air Wing RAF Previous units: No. 122 (Rocket Projectile) Wing RAF No. 122 Wing RAF
- Active: April 2006 - 2011; 1943-44; 1944; 1944-45; 1953-60
- Country: United Kingdom
- Branch: Royal Air Force
- Type: Expeditionary Air Wing
- Last base: RAF Cottesmore

Aircraft flown
- Fighter: British Aerospace Harrier II GR.9

No. 122 Expeditionary Air Wing is a former deployable Expeditionary Air Wing of the Royal Air Force based at RAF Cottesmore, Rutland, England.

The current wing was established on 1 April 2006 the wing has history dating back to May 1944:

== Second World War ==
No. 122 (Rocket Projectile) Wing within No. 15 Sector RAF, No. 83 Group RAF, RAF Second Tactical Air Force was formed on 12 May 1944 at RAF Gravesend operating North American Mustangs controlling:

- No. 19 Squadron RAF
- No. 65 (East India) Squadron RAF
- No. 122 (Bombay) Squadron RAF

The wing moved to RAF Funtington on 13 May 1944 then to RAF Ford on 18 June 1944. It moved to France on 23 June 1944, going to B.2 Bazonville, B.7 Martragny, B.12 Ellon, No.24 St Andre-De-L'Eure, B.24 Beauvais and B.60 Grimbergen before moving to England and RAF Matlaske on 28 September 1944. Where the wing was disbanded and became No. 150 Wing RAF.

No. 122 Wing was reformed on 28 September 1944 at Grimbergen, it moved to B.80 Volkel, B.112 Rheine-Hopsten, B.152 Fassberg, B.160 Kastrup and finally B.166 Flensburg where the unit was disbanded on 7 September 1945.

=== History of No. 122 Airfield ===
No. 122 Airfield Headquarters was formed on 15 February 1943 at RAF Zeals, moving shortly afterwards to RAF Chilbolton on 24 February 1943. The HQ then moved to back to Zeals on 13 March 1943 and moved to RAF Eastchurch on 4 April 1943, moving to RAF Bognor on 1 June 1943. The HQ moved to RAF Kingsnorth on 1 July 1943m then to RAF Gravesend on 20 October 1943. On 15 April 1944 it had a four day stay at RAF Ford before returning to Gravesend. Finally it moved to RAF Funtington on 29 April 1944 and was disbanded there on 12 May 1944.

Squadrons:

- No. 19 Squadron RAF (15 February 1943 to ?)
- No. 132 (City of Bombay) Squadron RAF (1 March 1943 to 18 May 1943) replaced by No. 122 (Bombay) Squadron RAF (18 May 1943 to 12 May 1944)
- No. 174 (Mauritius) Squadron RAF (1 March 1943 to 3 May 1943) replaced by No. 181 Squadron RAF (3 May 1943 to 12 May 1944)
- No. 184 Squadron RAF (1 March 1943 to 12 June 1943) replaced by No. 174 (Mauritius) Squadron RAF (12 June 1943 to 1 July 1943) replaced by No. 65 (East India) Squadron RAF (1 July 1943 to 12 May 1944)
- No. 602 (City of Glasgow) Squadron AAF (31 May 1943 to 13 August 1943) replaced by No. 184 Squadron RAF (14 August 1943 to 18 August 1943) replaced by No. 19 Squadron RAF (18 August 1943 to 12 May 1944)

== Post war ==
The wing was reformed on 1 April 1953 at RAF Jever, it controlled:

- No. 4 Squadron RAF
- No. 92 (East India) Squadron RAF
- No. 98 Squadron RAF (1 April 1953 to 15 July 1957)
- No. 118 Squadron RAF (6 May 1955 to 22 August 1957)

It was disbanded on 1 January 1960 stil at Jever.
