= RAF Deanland =

Former RAF station in East Sussex, England

RAF Deanland
- Near Ripe, East Sussex in England
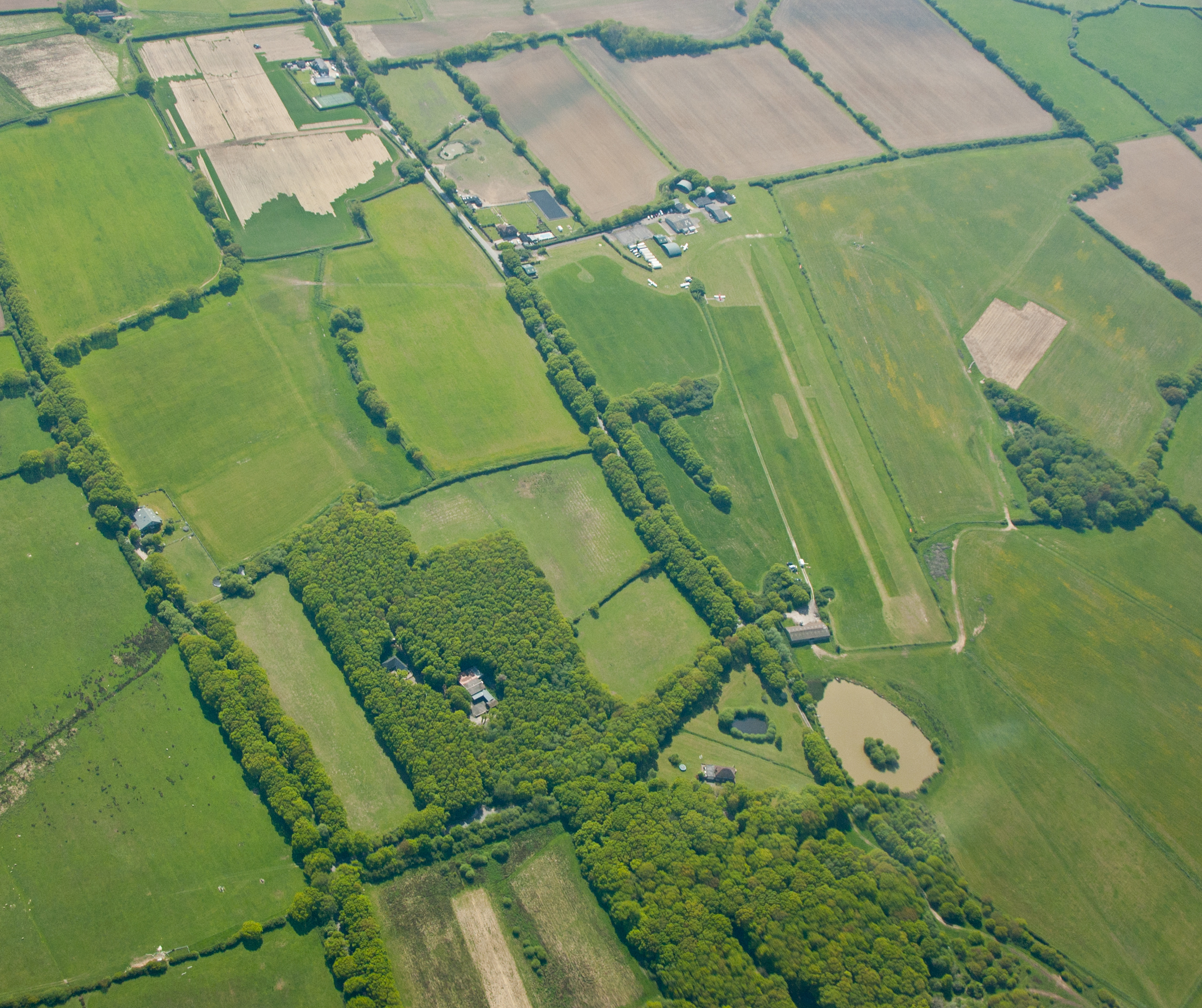
- Aerial view of Deanland Airfield in 2013

Site information
- Type: RAF advanced landing ground
- Code: XB
- Owner: Air Ministry
- Operator: Royal Air Force
- Controlled by: RAF Second Tactical Air Force * No. 84 Group RAF

Location
- Shown within East Sussex RAF Deanland (the United Kingdom)
- Coordinates: 50°52′50″N 000°09′09″E

Site history
- Built: 1943/44
- Built by: RAF Airfield Construction Service; Royal Engineers Airfield Construction Group
- In use: April 1944 – January 1945
- Battles/wars: European theatre of World War II

Airfield information
- Identifiers: ICAO: EGKL
- Elevation: 18 metres (59 ft) AMSL
Runways
Direction	Length and surface
06/24	457 metres (1,499 ft) Grass
00/00 (WW2)	Sommerfeld Tracking
00/00 (WW2)	Sommerfeld Tracking

Royal Air Force Deanland or more simply RAF Deanland is a former Royal Air Force advanced landing ground located 4 miles (6.4 km) west of Hailsham, East Sussex and 13.4 miles (21.6 km) north east of Brighton, East Sussex, England.

== History ==
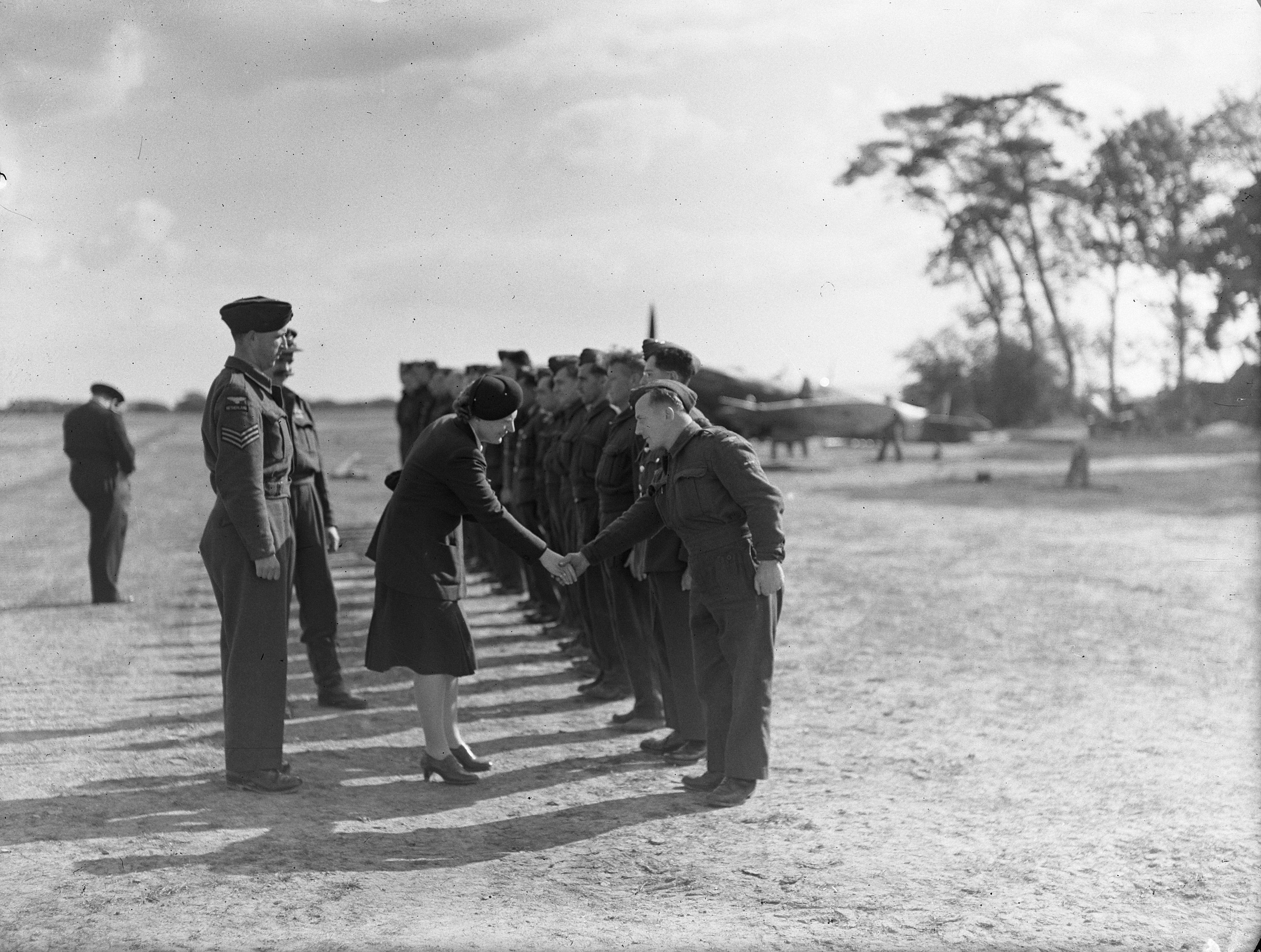
Princess Juliana of the Netherlands visiting men of No. 322 (Dutch) Squadron RAF at RAF Deanland, September 1944

RAF Deanland was planned as an Advanced Landing Ground in order to provide support for the D-Day Landings on 6 June 1944, with construction started in Spring 1943. The first aircraft to take to the air on D-Day flew from RAF Deanland, providing top-cover over the OMAHA and GOLD landing beaches.

The airfield was heavily involved in the fight against the V-1 flying bombs (with 185 destroyed) and during D-Day in which it is believed to have been the home of the first Supermarine Spitfire squadron to provide air cover.

The landing ground was used by multiple units:

- No. 64 Squadron RAF
- No. 91 (Nigeria) Squadron RAF
- No. 234 (Madras Presidency) Squadron RAF
- No. 302 Polish Fighter Squadron
- No. 308 Polish Fighter Squadron
- No. 317 Polish Fighter Squadron
- No. 322 (Dutch) Squadron RAF
- No. 345 (GC II/2 'Berry') Squadron RAF
- No. 611 (West Lancashire) Squadron AAF
- No. 131 Airfield Headquarters RAF
- No. 149 Airfield Headquarters RAF
- No. 149 (Long Range Fighter) Wing RAF

Along with the following ground units at some point:

- No. 2719 Squadron RAF Regiment
- No. 2750 Squadron RAF Regiment
- No. 2768 Squadron RAF Regiment
- No. 2823 Squadron RAF Regiment

On 6 June 1994, an oak-tree was planted at the western end of the airfield entrance-road. This tree is a memorial to those pilots who flew from Deanland and died in operations.

== Current use ==
The Airfield was dormant for a time, post-war, but the land came into the ownership of Richard Chandless, a farmer, who reactivated the site as an airfield in 1963. Richard operated his own aircraft, and he was for a number of years the main U.K. agent for Avions Pierre Robin demonstrating and selling new and used aircraft from Deanland. Richard invited a number of other aircraft owners to keep their machines at Deanland. During Chandless' time Deanland became a very active airfield, both day and night: lights were installed shortly after the runway was re-activated. It was used by a number of local business people, farmers and visitors to the area. With Glyndebourne Opera House close it was very normal to see both light aircraft and helicopters parked while their owners enjoyed the opera. In 1991 the airfield came into the ownership of Deanland Airfield LLP. In 2012 the airfield is still in use as a private airstrip.
