= No. 129 Wing RAF =

No. 129 Wing RAF No. 129 Airfield Headquarters RAF No. 129 (Fighter Bomber) Wing RAF No. 129 (RAF) Wing RAF
- Active: 1943-44; 1944; 1945
- Country: United Kingdom
- Branch: Royal Air Force
- Type: Wing
- Last base: RAF Chilbolton

No. 129 Wing RAF is a former Royal Air Force wing that was operational during the Second World War.

== Second World War ==
No. 129 (Fighter Bomber) Wing RAF was formed on 12 May 1944 at RAF Westhampnett within No. 15 Sector RAF, No. 83 Group RAF, RAF Second Tactical Air Force controlling No. 184 Squadron RAF. The wing moved to France and B.10 Plumetot on 28 June 1944 and was disbanded there on 12 July 1944.

No. 129 (RAF) Wing RAF was formed on 7 May 1945 at RAF Turnhouse within No. 88 Group RAF for Operation Apostle controlling RAF units near Stavanger, Norway. The wing moved to Stavanger/Sola on 30 May 1945 while controlling No. 330 (Norwegian) Squadron RAF and returned to England and RAF Chilbolton on 29 November 1945. The wing was disbanded on 12 December 1945.

== History of No. 129 Airfield Headquarters ==
The unit was formed on 4 July 1943 at RAF Gravesend within No. 35 Wing RAF controlling No. 414 Squadron RCAF and No. 430 Squadron RCAF, it moved to RAF Odiham on 7 August 1943. It then moved to RAF North Weald on 15 November 1943, RAF Sawbridgeworth on 29 February 1944 and finally RAF Gatwick on 4 April 1944, where the unit was disbanded on 12 May 1944.

== See also ==
- List of wings of the Royal Air Force
