= No. 134 Wing RAF =

No. 134 Wing RAF No. 134 (Czech) (Fighter) Wing RAF No. 134 (Czech) Airfield Headquarters RAF
- Active: 1943-44; 1944-45
- Country: United Kingdom
- Allegiance: (Czech Republic) Czechoslovak government-in-exile
- Branch: Royal Air Force
- Size: Wing
- Last base: RAF Manston

Aircraft flown
- Fighter: Supermarine Spitfire

No. 134 (Czech) (Fighter) Wing RAF is a former Royal Air Force wing that was operational during the Second World War.

The unit was previously No. 134 (Czech) Airfield Headquarters RAF between 1943 and 1944.

== History ==
No. 134 (Czech) Airfield Headquarters was formed on 8 November 1943 at RAF Ibsley within Air Defence of Great Britain controlling:

- No. 310 (Czechoslovak) Squadron RAF
- No. 312 (Czechoslovak) Squadron RAF
- No. 313 (Czechoslovak) Squadron RAF

which all operated the Supermarine Spitfire.

On 7 January 1944 control of the HQ changed to No. 84 Group RAF and shortly afterwards on 18 February 1944 the HQ moved to RAF Mendlesham. On 3 April 1944 the HQ moved to RAF Appledram and was transferred to No. 19 Wing RAF on 20 April 1944. The HQ became No. 134 (Czech) (Fighter) Wing RAF on 12 May 1944.

No. 134 (Czech) (Fighter) Wing RAF was formed within No. 84 Group RAF, RAF Second Tactical Air Force (2 TAF) at RAF Appledram, still with 310, 312 and 313 Squadrons. On 22 June 1944 the Wing moved to RAF Tangmere with 33, 74 and No. 127 Squadron RAF arriving on 3 July 1944. The wing moved to RAF Lympne on 3 July 1944 and was temporarily loaned to No. 11 Group RAF. 33 and 74 Squadrons left on 17 July and the wing moved to RAF North Weald on 27 August 1944. Moving again on 30 December 1944 to RAF Bradwell Bay then finally to RAF Manston on 27 February 1945. The squadrons left on 24 August 1945 and the wing was disbanded.

== See also ==
- List of Wings of the Royal Air Force
