= No. 138 Expeditionary Air Wing =

No. 138 Expeditionary Air Wing RAF Previous units: No. 138 Airfield RAF No. 138 (Bomber) Wing RAF No. 138 Wing RAF No. 138 Expeditionary Air Wing (Fighter / Ground Attack) RAF

- No. 138 Wing Badge
- Active: 1 April 2006 - 10 November 1943 - 12 May 1944; 12 May 1944 - 14 April 1946; 1 April 1953 - 1 January 1960
- Country: United Kingdom
- Branch: Royal Air Force
- Type: Expeditionary Air Wing
- Role: Fighter / Ground Attack
- Size: Wing
- Garrison/HQ: RAF Marham
- Motto(s): Defend by Attack

Commanders
- Officer Commanding: Group Captain P C Osborn

Aircraft flown
- Fighter: Lockheed Martin F-35B Lightning II

No. 138 Expeditionary Air Wing RAF is a deployable Expeditionary Air Wing of the Royal Air Force based at RAF Marham, Norfolk, England, UK.

The current wing was established on 1 April 2006 the unit has history dating back to February 1943.

== Second World War ==
No. 138 Airfield RAF

The unit was formed on 10 November 1943 at RAF Lasham within No. 2 Group RAF.

No. 138 (Bomber) Wing RAF

No. 138 Wing fought with No. 2 Group RAF, RAF Second Tactical Air Force (2TAF) in North-West Europe after D-Day.

== Current use ==
Re-formed on 1 April 2006 as an EAW, the Wing is led by the Station Commander of RAF Marham, supported by their Station management team. The deployable elements of the RAF Marham form the core of the EAW, reinforced by assigned Capability-based Module Readiness System (CMRS) personnel and elements of the Air Combat Support Units (ACSUs). EAWs enable the RAF to train as cohesive units of Air Power which are prepared and capable of transitioning quickly from peacetime structures and deploying swiftly on operations.

During December 2021 the unit deployed to Stornoway, Outer Hebrides, Scotland, UK.

== See also ==
- List of Wings of the Royal Air Force
