= RAF Bognor =

Former Royal Air Force flying base in West Sussex, England

RAF Bognor
- Near Bognor, West Sussex in England

Site information
- Type: RAF Advanced landing ground
- Code: OG
- Owner: Air Ministry
- Operator: Royal Air Force
- Controlled by: Second Tactical Air Force * No. 83 Group RAF * No. 84 Group RAF

Location
- Shown within West Sussex RAF Bognor (the United Kingdom)
- Coordinates: 50°47′15″N 000°42′30″W

Site history
- Built: 1943
- Built by: Royal Canadian Engineers
- In use: June 1943-January 1945
- Battles/wars: European theatre of World War II

Airfield information
- Elevation: 23 feet (7 m) AMSL
Runways
Direction	Length and surface
05/23	1,280 metres (4,199 ft) Sommerfeld tracking
07/25	1,463 metres (4,800 ft) Sommerfeld tracking

Royal Air Force Bognor or more simply RAF Bognor (also known as Bognor Advanced Landing Ground (A.L.G.)) is a former Royal Air Force Advanced landing ground 2 miles (3.2 km) north of Bognor, West Sussex, England.

== History ==
Survey work on the site was undertaken in "mid-1942", with construction beginning in early 1943, completed by the Royal Canadian Engineers. Bognor was one of 82 planned Operation Hadrian sites planned with only 26 being built. The original budget for the site was £20,500. The airfield became operational on 1 June 1943 with two intersecting Sommerfield track runways. The site was under the control of RAF Tangmere located four miles further north.

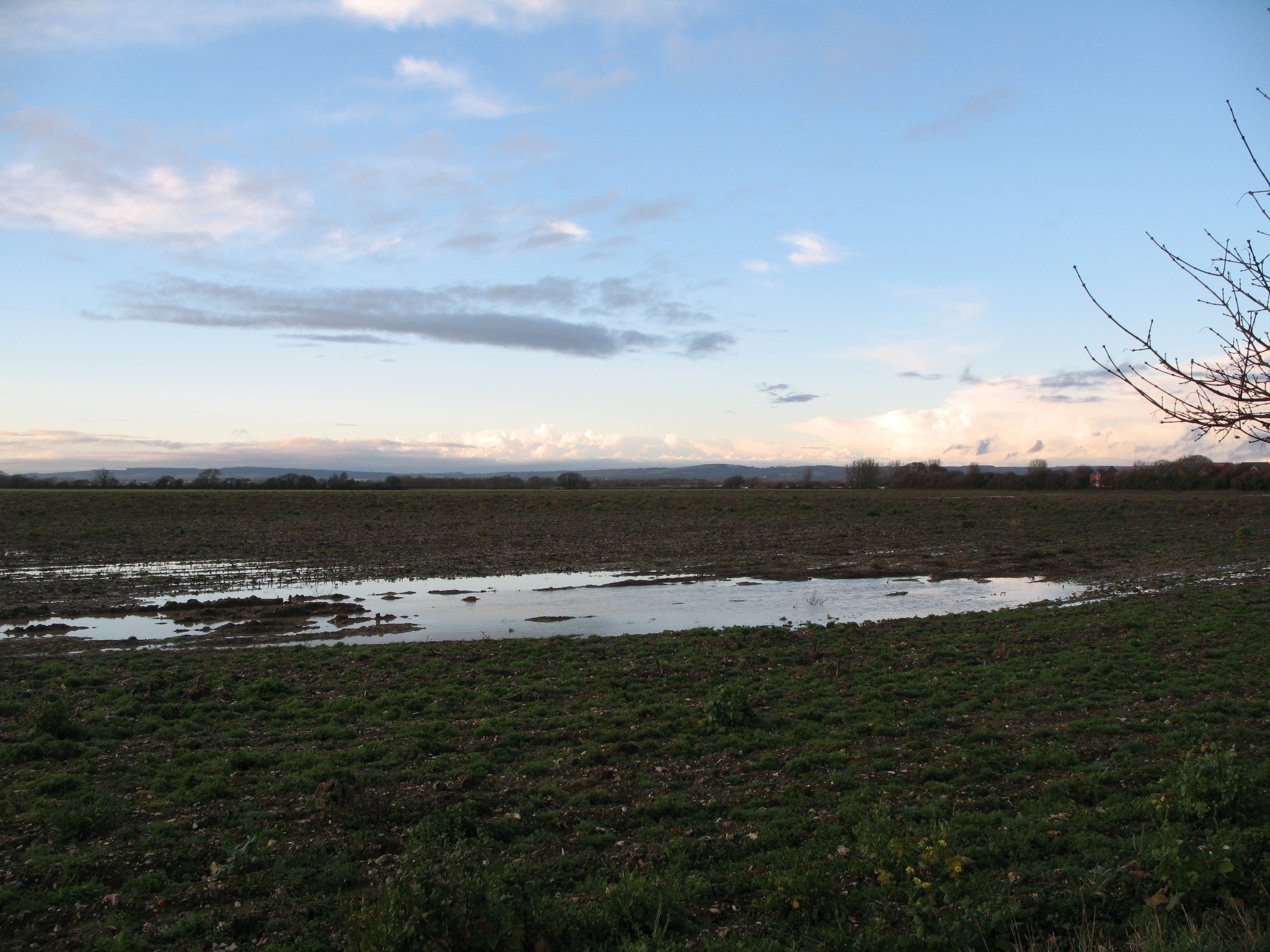
A photo of the field where RAF Bognor used to be

The site was originally a training site for aircrews to practise operating with few facilities, however, in Autumn 1943, extra over blister hangars were installed. These provided shelter for most aircraft that were stationed at Bognor, little accommodation was provided for the aircrews who lived in tented camps. The site was used as a forward staging base for a number of fighter and ground attack units for the D-Day assault, however, these soon moved to back to Tangmere and were replaced by 83 Group and 1310 Flight. 1310 flew Ansons from Bognor in an air ambulance and medical supply capacity to the advancing forces on the French coastline.

83 Group left the site in late September 1944 and need for the airfield ceased to exist. Runway removal works were carried out during the Autumn of 1944 and by early 1945, the site had been returned to its original owners. Parts of the site have now been built over by the expanding Bognor Regis or returned to farmland with few noticeable remnants of the airfield remaining.

== Units ==
Squadron	Dates	Aircraft
No. 19 Squadron RAF	6 Jun 1943 – 2 Jul 1943	Supermarine Spitfire
No. 66 Squadron RAF	31 Mar 1944 – 22 Jun 1944	Supermarine Spitfire
No. 122 (Bombay) Squadron RAF	1 Jun 1943 – 1 Jul 1943	Supermarine Spitfire
No. 331 (Norwegian) Squadron RAF	31 Mar 1944 – 22 Jun 1944	Supermarine Spitfire
No. 332 (Norwegian) Squadron RAF	31 Mar 1944 – 22 Jun 1944	Supermarine Spitfire
No. 602 (City of Glasgow) Squadron AAF	1 Jun 1943 – 1 Jul 1943	Supermarine Spitfire
No. 1310 Flight RAF	25 Jun 1944 – 21 Jul 1944	Avro Anson
No. 83 (Composite) Group Support Unit	25 Jun 1944 – 25 Sep 1944	Supermarine Spitfire, Mustang IV, Typhoon

Additional units:

- No. 122 Airfield Headquarters RAF between 1 June and 1 July 1943
- No. 132 (Norwegian) (Fighter) Wing RAF between 12 May and 21 June 1944
- No. 2765 Squadron RAF Regiment
- No. 2893 Squadron RAF Regiment
- No. 2894 Squadron RAF Regiment
- No. 3205 Servicing Commando
- No. 3207 Servicing Commando
