= No. 137 Wing RAF =

No. 137 Wing RAF No. 137 (Bomber) Wing RAF No. 137 Airfield Headquarters RAF
- Active: 1943-44; 1944-45; 1953-60
- Country: United Kingdom
- Branch: Royal Air Force
- Size: Wing
- Last base: RAF Wildenrath

Aircraft flown
- Bomber: Bostons; Mitchells

No. 137 Wing RAF is a former Royal Air Force wing that was operational during the Second World War and the early Cold War.

The unit was previously No. 137 Airfield Headquarters RAF between 1943 and 1944.

== History ==
No. 137 Airfield Headquarters was formed on 14 November 1943 at RAF Hartford Bridge (renamed to RAF Blackbushe on 18 November 1944) within No. 2 Group RAF. It consisted of:

- No. 88 (Hong Kong) Squadron RAF
- No. 107 Squadron RAF
- No. 342 (GB I/20 'Lorraine') Squadron RAF

which flew Douglas Bostons and North American Mitchells.

The unit was disbanded on 12 May 1944 and became No. 137 Wing.

No. 137 (Bomber) Wing RAF was formed within No. 2 Group RAF, RAF Second Tactical Air Force on 12 May 1944 still at Hartford Bridge, consisting of:

- No. 88 (Hong Kong) Squadron RAF (disbanded 4 April 1945)
- No. 226 Squadron RAF (disbanded 20 September 1945)
- No. 305 Polish Bomber Squadron (arrived 7 September 1945, departed 24 November 1945)
- No. 342 (GB I/20 'Lorraine') Squadron RAF

still with Bostons and Mitchells. The wing moved to France and Advanced landing ground B.50 Vitry-en-Artois on 17 October 1944, moving to B.77 Glize-Rijen on 22 April 1945. The wing was disbanded on 30 November 1945.

No. 137 Wing RAF was reformed on 1 April 1953 at RAF Wildenrath within No. 83 Group RAF consisting of:

- No. 67 Squadron RAF (departed 5 July 1955)
- No. 71 Squadron RAF (departed 7 July 1955)
- No. 88 (Hong Kong) Squadron RAF (arrived 15 January 1956)
- No. 17 Squadron RAF (arrived 3 April 1957)

The wing was moved to No. 2 Group RAF during August 1958 and was disbanded on 1 January 1960 still at Wildenrath.

== See also ==
- List of Wings of the Royal Air Force
