= RAF Appledram =

Former Royal Air Force Advanced Landing Ground in West Sussex, England

RAF Appledram
- Near Apuldram, West Sussex in England

Site information
- Type: RAF Advanced landing ground
- Code: AO
- Owner: Air Ministry
- Operator: Royal Air Force
- Controlled by: Second Tactical Air Force * No. 83 Group RAF * No. 84 Group RAF

Location
- Shown within West Sussex RAF Appledram (the United Kingdom)
- Coordinates: 50°48′36″N 000°48′21″W

Site history
- Built: 1943
- Built by: RAF Airfield Construction Service
- In use: May 1943 - November 1944
- Battles/wars: European theatre of World War II

Airfield information
- Elevation: 22 feet (7 m) AMSL
Runways
Direction	Length and surface
00/00	Sommerfeld Tracking
00/00	Sommerfeld Tracking

Royal Air Force Appledram or more simply RAF Appledram is a former Royal Air Force Advanced landing ground 2 miles (3.2 km) southwest of Chichester, West Sussex, England and 12 miles (19 km) east of Portsmouth, Hampshire.

== History ==
Authorisation was given to build an Advanced landing ground south-west of Chichester and near the village of Apuldram in December 1942. Advanced Landing Grounds were temporary airfields with limited facilities intended for the upcoming invasion of France. A total of 23 Advanced Landing Grounds were built in the South and South-East of England in 1943–1944. Work began on the airfield in February 1943, with two runways made of Sommerfeld tracking being laid. Accommodation consisted largely of tents, with one Blister hangar and metal mesh hardstanding for aircraft added during the autumn/winter of 1943–44. The airfield was completed in May that year.

The first users of the airfield were the Hawker Typhoon fighters of three squadrons of 124 Airfield Headquarters, (175, 181 and 182 Squadrons), which moved in on 2 June 1943. They carried out attacks against airfields, communications centres and radar stations before leaving for airfields in Kent early in July 1943, with the airfield temporarily being used for grazing farm animals.

The next user of the airfield was 134 Airfield Headquarters, which consisted of the Czechoslovak-manned, Supermarine Spitfire-equipped 310, 312 and 313 Squadrons, which moved in on 3 April 1944. The three squadrons carried out a mixture of fighter sweeps, bomber escort and attacks against V-weapon launch sites. On 6 June 1944, as Operation Overlord (the invasion of German-occupied Europe) took place, the wing's aircraft provided fighter cover over the beaches. These operations continuing until 22 June when the wing moved to RAF Tangmere to intercept V-1 flying bombs. The wing was replaced by the Polish-manned No. 131 Wing RAF (302, 308 and 317 Squadrons), which carried out ground attack operations in support of the advancing allied troops before leaving for RAF Ford on 16 July and then transferring to airfields in France.

RAF Appledram saw no further operational use, and it was released for farming in November 1944, with the hangar, runways and dispersals removed in January 1945.

== Posted units ==
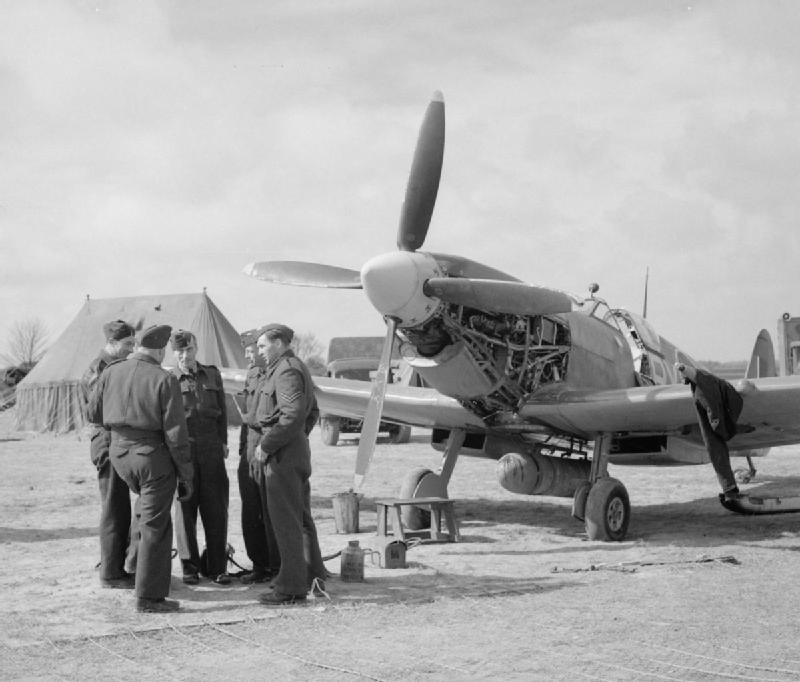
Ground crew changing the engine oil of a Spitfire LF My IX at RAF Appledram

- No. 175 Squadron RAF
- No. 181 Squadron RAF
- No. 182 Squadron RAF
- No. 302 Polish Fighter Squadron
- No. 308 Polish Fighter Squadron
- No. 310 (Czechoslovak) Squadron RAF
- No. 312 (Czechoslovak) Squadron RAF
- No. 313 (Czechoslovak) Squadron RAF
- No. 317 Polish Fighter Squadron

Units

- No. 124 Airfield Headquarters RAF (June - July 1943)
- No. 131 (Polish) (Fighter) Wing RAF (June - July 1944)
- No. 134 Airfield Headquarters RAF (April 1944) became No. 134 (Czech) (Fighter) Wing RAF (May - June 1944)
- No. 411 (Polish) Repair & Salvage Unit (July - August 1944)
- No. 420 Repair & Salvage Unit (March - July 1944)
- No. 1312 Mobile Wing RAF Regiment
- No. 1315 Mobile Wing RAF Regiment
- No. 2804 Squadron RAF Regiment

== See also ==
- List of former Royal Air Force stations
