= No. 147 Wing RAF =

No. 147 Wing RAF was a wing of the Royal Air Force operational between 12 May 1944 and 24 March 1945 during the Second World War.

It was previously No. 147 Airfield Headquarters RAF which was operational between 16 February and 12 May 1944.
