= RAF Newchurch =

Former RAF station in Kent, England

RAF Newchurch
- Near Newchurch, Kent in England
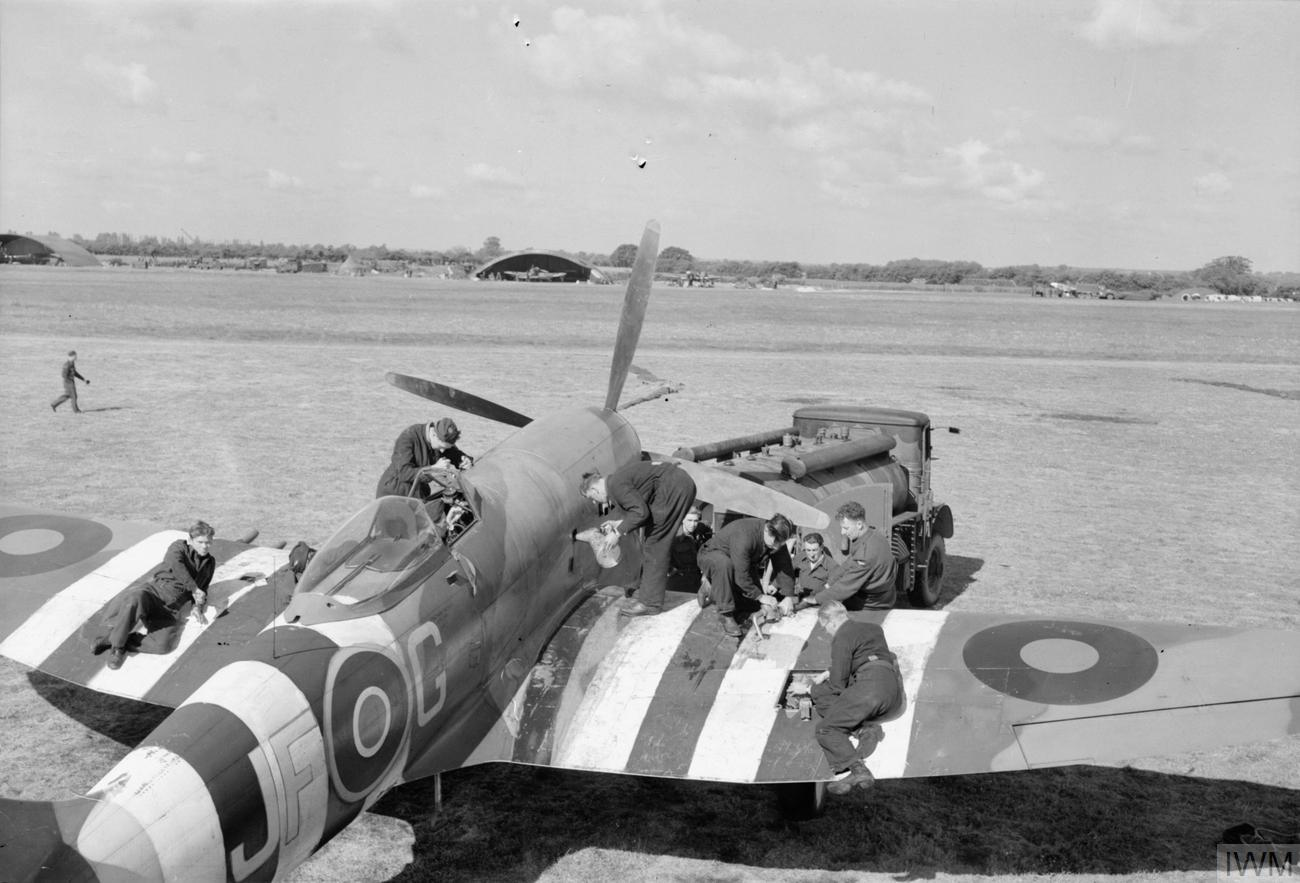
- Ground crew refuel and re-arm Hawker Tempest Mark V 'JF-G' of No. 3 Squadron RAF at Newchurch

Site information
- Type: RAF Advanced landing ground
- Code: XN
- Owner: Air Ministry
- Operator: Royal Air Force
- Controlled by: RAF Fighter Command * No. 83 Group RAF * No. 85 Group RAF

Location
- Shown within Kent RAF Newchurch (the United Kingdom)
- Coordinates: 51°03′04″N 00°55′13″E

Site history
- Built: 1943
- Built by: RAF Airfield Construction Service
- In use: July 1943 – 1945
- Battles/wars: European theatre of World War II

Airfield information
- Elevation: 0 metres (0 ft) AMSL
Runways
Direction	Length and surface
00/00	Sommerfeld Tracking
00/00	Sommerfeld Tracking

Royal Air Force Newchurch or RAF Newchurch was a temporary Second World War airfield at Newchurch, Kent. It was a base for a Hawker Tempest wing that gave fighter cover over occupied France in the period up to and beyond D-Day and later defended south-east England against attack from V-1 flying bombs.

== History ==
Newchurch was one of a number of Advanced Landing Grounds (ALG) built in Kent during 1943. From July 1943 it became the base for three Supermarine Spitfire and one Hawker Hurricane squadrons. In October 1943 the squadrons moved to RAF Detling while the airfield was improved.

In April 1944 it became the base of 150 Wing comprising three squadrons of Hawker Tempests. Commanded by Wing Commander Roland Beamont the Newchurch Tempest Wing provided air cover for the Normandy landings it was then tasked with defending against attacks by V-1 flying bombs. The Wing destroyed 638 V-1s before leaving Newchurch to support the advance through Belgium and the Netherland. No longer needed in December 1944 the airfield was restored to farmland.

== Royal Air Force units and aircraft ==
Unit	Dates	Aircraft	Variant	Notes
No. 3 Squadron RAF	28 April 1944 – 21 September 1944	Hawker Tempest	V	
No. 19 Squadron RAF	2 July 1943 – 18 August 1943	Supermarine Spitfire	VB & VC	
No. 56 Squadron RAF	28 April 1944 – 23 September 1944	Hawker Tempest	V	
No. 132 (City of Bombay) Squadron RAF	3 July 1943 – 12 October 1943	Supermarine Spitfire	VB/IXB	
No. 184 Squadron RAF	17 September 1943 – 12 October 1943	Hawker Hurricane	IV	
No. 486 Squadron RNZAF	29 April 1944 – 19 September 1944	Hawker Tempest	V	
No. 602 (City of Glasgow) Squadron AAF	13 August 1943 – 12 October 1943	Supermarine Spitfire	VB	

The following units were also here at some point:

- No. 125 Airfield Headquarters RAF (August – October 1943)
- No. 150 Airfield Headquarters RAF (April – May 1944)
- No. 2749 Squadron RAF Regiment
- No. 2800 Squadron RAF Regiment
- No. 2834 Squadron RAF Regiment
- No. 2878 Squadron RAF Regiment
- No. 2880 Squadron RAF Regiment
