= No. 136 Wing RAF =

No. 136 (Fighter Bomber) Wing RAF No. 136 (Fighter) Wing RAF No. 136 Airfield Headquarters RAF
- Active: 1943–44; 1944; 1944–45
- Country: United Kingdom
- Branch: Royal Air Force
- Size: Wing
- Last base: B.80 Volkel

Aircraft flown
- Fighter: Hawker Typhoon

No. 136 Wing RAF is a former Royal Air Force wing that was operational during the Second World War.

The unit was previously No. 136 Airfield Headquarters RAF between 1943 and 1944.

== History ==
No. 136 Airfield Headquarters was formed on 22 November 1943 at RAF Fairlop within No. 84 Group RAF.

It was transferred to No. 20 Wing RAF on 1 January 1944. It moved to RAF Thorney Island on 6 April then RAF Llanbedr on 11 April, returning to Thorney Island on 22 April 1944.

It was disbanded on 12 May 1944 and became No. 136 (Fighter) Wing RAF.

No. 136 (Fighter) Wing RAF was formed within No. 84 Group RAF, RAF Second Tactical Air Force at RAF Thorney Island on 12 May 1944.

It was disbanded into No. 123 Wing RAF on 26 July 1944.

No. 136 (Fighter Bomber) Wing RAF was reformed on 20 October 1944 within No. 2 Group RAF at RAF Hartford Bridge.

It was disbanded on 15 September 1945 at B. 80 Volkel.

== See also ==
- List of Wings of the Royal Air Force
