= No. 146 Wing RAF =

No. 146 Wing RAF No. 146 (Fighter) Wing RAF No. 146 Airfield Headquarters RAF
- Active: May 1944 – September 1945
- Country: United Kingdom
- Branch: Royal Air Force
- Size: Wing

No. 146 Wing RAF was a formation of the Royal Air Force during the Second World War. It comprised No. 193 (Fellowship of the Bellows) Squadron RAF, No. 197 Squadron RAF, No. 257 (Burma) Squadron RAF, No. 263 (Fellowship of the Bellows) Squadron RAF and No. 266 (Rhodesia) Squadron RAF.

From April 1944 RAF Needs Oar Point was a base for Hawker Typhoon fighter-bomber squadrons of No. 146 Wing of the 2nd Tactical Air Force supporting the Normandy landings. RAFWeb.org however lists the actual establishment date of the wing as 12 May 1944.

The squadrons operated Hawker Typhoons in ground attack operations under the command of John Robert Baldwin.

On 6 June 1944, the day of the Normandy landings, the wing was under the command of No. 20 (Fighter) Sector, No. 84 Group RAF.

The wing was disbanded on 7 September 1945.
