= Tactical Provost Wing =

The Tactical Police Squadron (TPS) is a group of around 150 regular and 50 reservist (RAuxAF) Royal Air Force Police with its headquarters at RAF Honington in Suffolk, England. The reservists comprise No 3 (Royal Auxiliary Air Force) Police Squadron.

TPS is soon to be disbanded and broken into Tactical Police Flts, which will be integrated in to RAF Regt Field Sqns. This will remove them from any traditional Police roles.

== History ==
Originally established in 2001 to provide support to two simultaneous lines of communication military policing operations (one warlike, one non-warlike) it comprised 2 regular Squadrons and one Auxiliary Squadron. Since this time it has trained and been resourced to provide a function similar to that of an RMP Provost Support unit. However, in 2006/2007 a decision was made to reduce the establishment to one regular squadron and one reserve squadron (No. 3 Squadron, TPW) with an establishment of 50.

== Operations ==
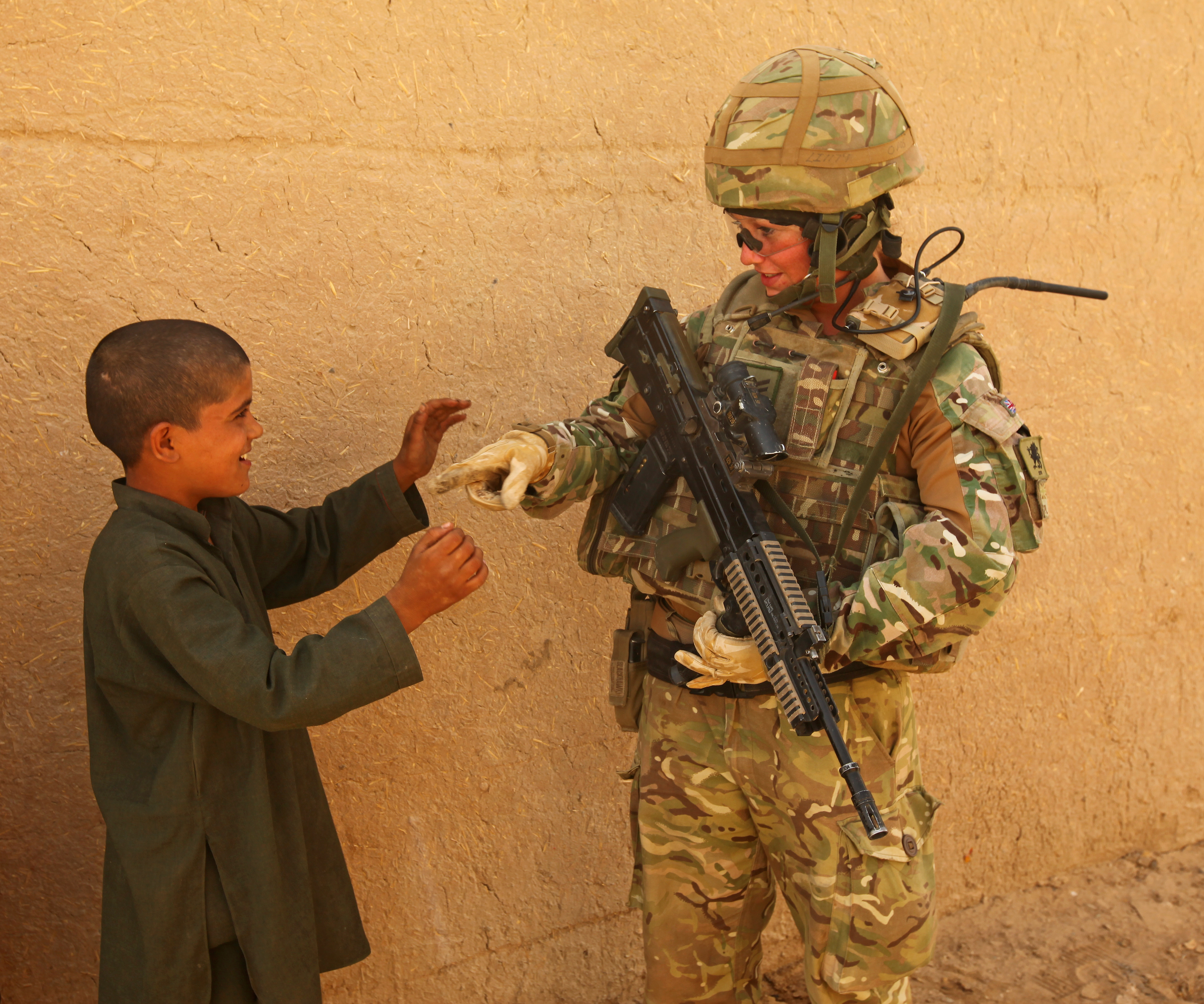
Security patrol for a shura outside Camp Leatherneck, Afghanistan

TPW's first major operational deployment was in Iraq 2003, where No. 1 Sqn, TPW operated as a full sub-unit under command of CO 5 RMP, as part of the Joint Force Logistics component and was the first full MP sub-unit to deploy to the theatre. OC 1 Sqn was Sqn Ldr Girvan Stewart, his 2i/c was Flt Lt Gavin Outteridge and they were joined by the WgWO, WO "Tosh" Thomas, Wg QM FS Kev Huggins, FS Fred Dawson as FS Ops, Sgt Gaz Edwards RSI and Sgt Phil Rodd HQ Flt,

The primary role of 1 Sqn during major conflict operations was LoCP (Line of Communication Policing) on the military road-route network linking the air and sea ports in Kuwait to the front line. This included route reconnaissance and signing, escort of troops and supplies along the road network, traffic policing and counter-terrorist patrolling. In 2003, the entire UK joint force was moved into and out of theatre with no own forces fatalities in 1 Sqn's Area of Responsibility.

Additional duties undertaken within the standard MP roles of regulation, protection and information included Air Transport Security (ATSy) duties at coalition airheads, enforcement of discipline e.g. patrolling areas out of bounds to UK forces in Kuwait, and close protection for UK Air rank officers. TPW now performs similar tasks in both Iraq and Afghanistan.

== See also ==
- British Armed Forces
- Royal Air Force
