= No. 144 Wing RAF =

No. 144 Wing RAF was a wing of the Royal Air Force operational between 12 May and 12 July 1944 during the Second World War.

It was previously No. 144 Airfield Headquarters RAF which was operational between 1 February and 12 May 1944.
