= No. 175 Squadron RAF =

Defunct flying squadron of the Royal Air Force

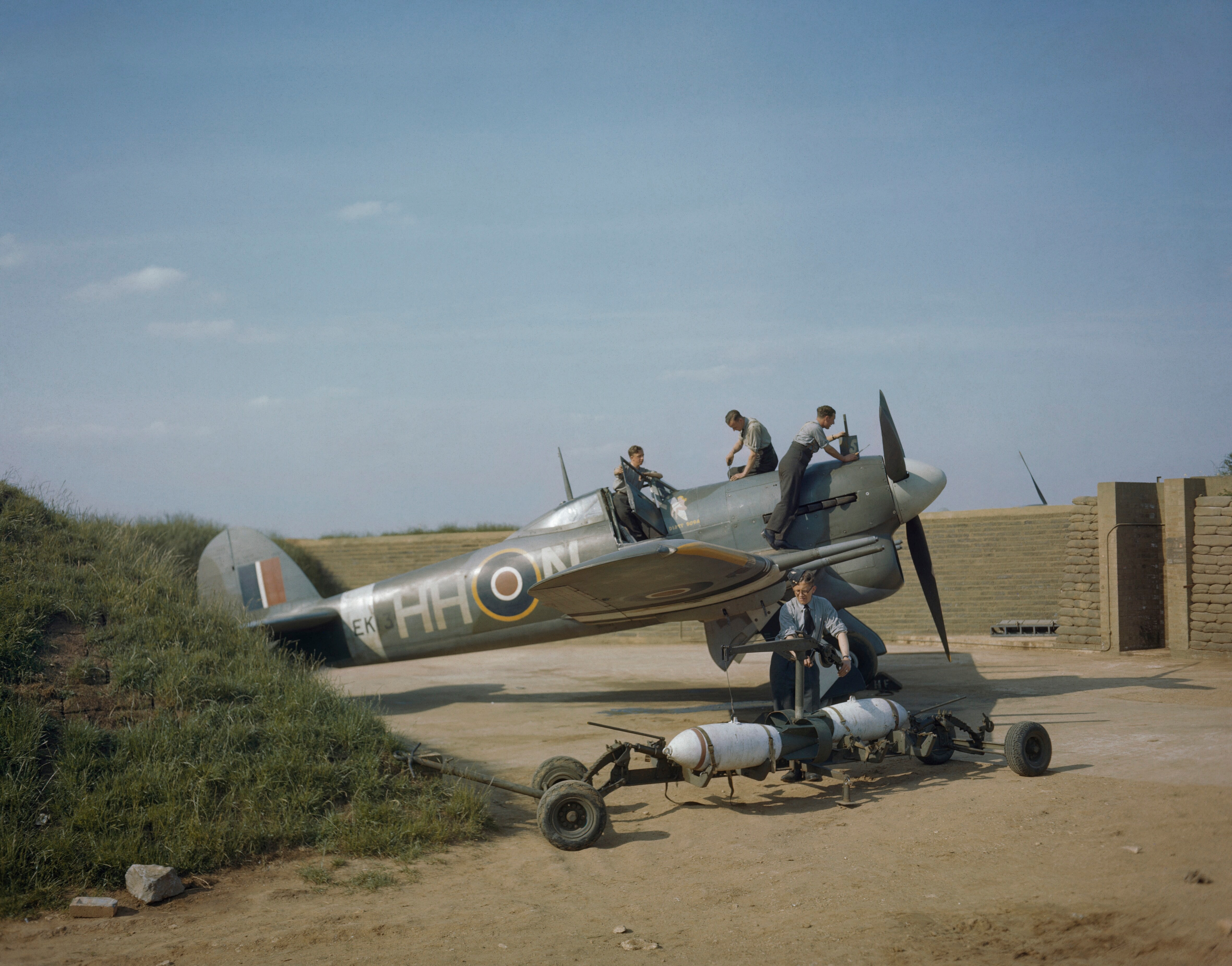
- Hawker Typhoon Ib EK139 N "Dirty Dora" being armed with 500 lb (227 kg) concrete practice bombs in late 1943
- Active: 3 March 1942 – 29 September 1945
- Country: United Kingdom
- Branch: Royal Air Force
- Motto: Stop at nothing

No. 175 Squadron RAF was a part of 121 Wing; 83 Group; 2nd Tactical Airforce; RAF in support of World War II Normandy landings, and supported the allied advance through France Holland and Belgium on into Germany. The squadron was active from under canvas on temporary landing grounds in a matter of days after the D-Day landings. The squadron initially flew Hawker Hurricane fighters and was later outfitted with Hawker Typhoons prior to the invasion. The squadron was based in various locations during World War II such as RAF Redhill and RAF Dunsfold.

On 13 April 1942, during a demonstration ground attack at Imber Ranges, a pilot from the squadron killed 25 military personnel, having mistaken them for targets. The demonstration was a dress rehearsal for a visit by Winston Churchill and General George Marshall, Chief of Staff of the United States Army, which went ahead as planned three days later.
