= No. 150 Wing RAF =

No. 150 Wing RAF Previous units: No. 150 Airfield Headquarters RAF
- Active: March 1944–March 1945
- Country: United Kingdom
- Branch: Royal Air Force
- Type: Fighter wing

Aircraft flown
- Attack: Hawker Tempest

No. 150 Wing RAF was a wing of the Royal Air Force operational between 12 May 1944 and 8 March 1945, during the Second World War. From mid-June to early September, its Hawker Tempest fighters was involved in Operation Diver, the RAF's campaign against the V-1 flying bombs launched against the southeast of England.

It was previously No. 150 Airfield Headquarters RAF which was operational between 8 March and 12 May 1944.

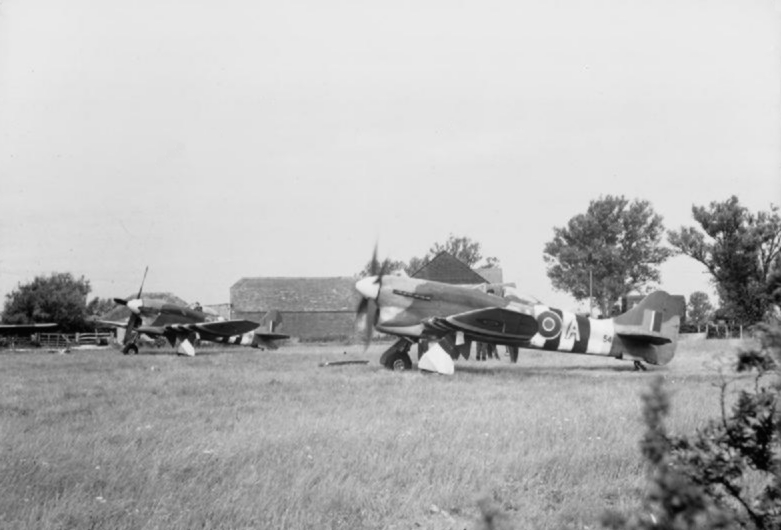
No. 486 Squadron was part of No. 150 Wing; it operated Hawker Tempest fighters from Newchurch in 1944
