= No. 132 Wing RAF =

No. 132 Wing RAF No. 132 (Norwegian) (Fighter) Wing RAF No. 132 (Norwegian) Airfield Headquarters RAF
- Active: 1944-45
- Country: United Kingdom
- Branch: Royal Air Force
- Role: Air supremacy
- Size: Wing

Aircraft flown
- Attack: Hawker Typhoon

No. 132 Wing RAF was a formation of the Royal Air Force during the Second World War. No. 66 Squadron RAF, No. 127 Squadron RAF, No. 322 (Dutch) Squadron RAF, No. 331 (Norwegian) Squadron RAF and No. 332 (Norwegian) Squadron RAF were some of the fighter squadrons assigned to the wing during the war.

The wing was transferred to the Royal Norwegian Air Force on 21 November 1945.

== See also ==
- List of Wings of the Royal Air Force

== Bibliography ==
- Shores, Christopher F.; Thomas, Chris (2004). 2nd Tactical Air Force. Vol. 1: Spartan to Normandy: June 1943 to June 1944. Hersham, UK: Classic Publications. ISBN 1-903223-40-7.
- Sturtivant, Ray; Hamlin, John (2007). Royal Air Force flying training and support units since 1912. Tonbridge, UK: Air-Britain (Historians). ISBN 978-0851-3036-59.
