= No. 149 Wing RAF =

No. 149 Wing RAF Previous units: No. 149 Airfield Headquarters RAF
- Active: May 1944–June 1945
- Country: United Kingdom
- Branch: Royal Air Force

No. 149 Wing RAF was a wing of the Royal Air Force operational between 12 May 1944 and 9 June 1945 during the Second World War.

It was previously No. 149 Airfield Headquarters RAF which was operational between 1 March and 12 May 1944.
