= No. 145 Wing RAF =

No. 145 Wing RAF No. 145 (French) (Fighter) Wing RAF No. 145 (French) Airfield Headquarters RAF
- Active: 1944-45
- Country: United Kingdom
- Branch: Royal Air Force
- Size: Wing

No. 145 Wing RAF was a largely French-manned formation of the Royal Air Force during the Second World War.

It comprised No. 341 (G.C.III/2 'Alsace') Squadron RAF, No. 74 Squadron RAF, No. 329 (GC I/2 'Cicognes') Squadron RAF, No. 345 (GC II/2 'Berry') Squadron RAF and No. 575 Squadron RAF.

== See also ==
- List of Wings of the Royal Air Force
