= No. 84 Group RAF =

Former Royal Air Force operations group

No. 84 Group RAF No. 84 (Composite) Group
- Active: 15 July 1943 – 15 December 1947
- Country: United Kingdom
- Branch: Royal Air Force
- Part of: RAF Second Tactical Air Force
- Last base: Brandenburg Barracks, Celle

Commanders
- Last AOC: AVM Percy Maitland

Aircraft flown
- Fighter: Hawker Typhoon; North American Mustang; Supermarine Spitfire

No. 84 Group RAF was a group of the Royal Air Force Second Tactical Air Force which was operational during the Second World War

It was formed at Cowley Barracks, Oxford on 15 July 1943. By 24 July 1944 a Rear Headquarters had been formed at Cowley.

On 5 June 1944 it consisted of:

- Hawker Typhoon fighter-bombers
  - No. 123 Wing RAF at RAF Thorney Island
  - No. 136 Wing RAF at RAF Thorney Island
  - No. 146 Wing RAF at RAF Needs Oar Point
- North American Mustangs
  - No. 133 (Polish) Wing RAF at RAF Coolham
- Supermarine Spitfire fighters
  - No. 131 Wing RAF at RAF Chailey
  - No. 132 Wing RAF at RAF Bognor
  - No. 134 Wing RAF at RAF Appledram
  - No. 135 Wing RAF at RAF Selsey
  - No. 145 Wing RAF at RAF Merston

Its last Air Officer Commanding was Air Vice Marshal Percy Maitland. By January 1948 Maitland was taking over command of No. 22 Group RAF.
