= UPASI Tea Research Foundation =

Research organisation in Tamil Nadu, India

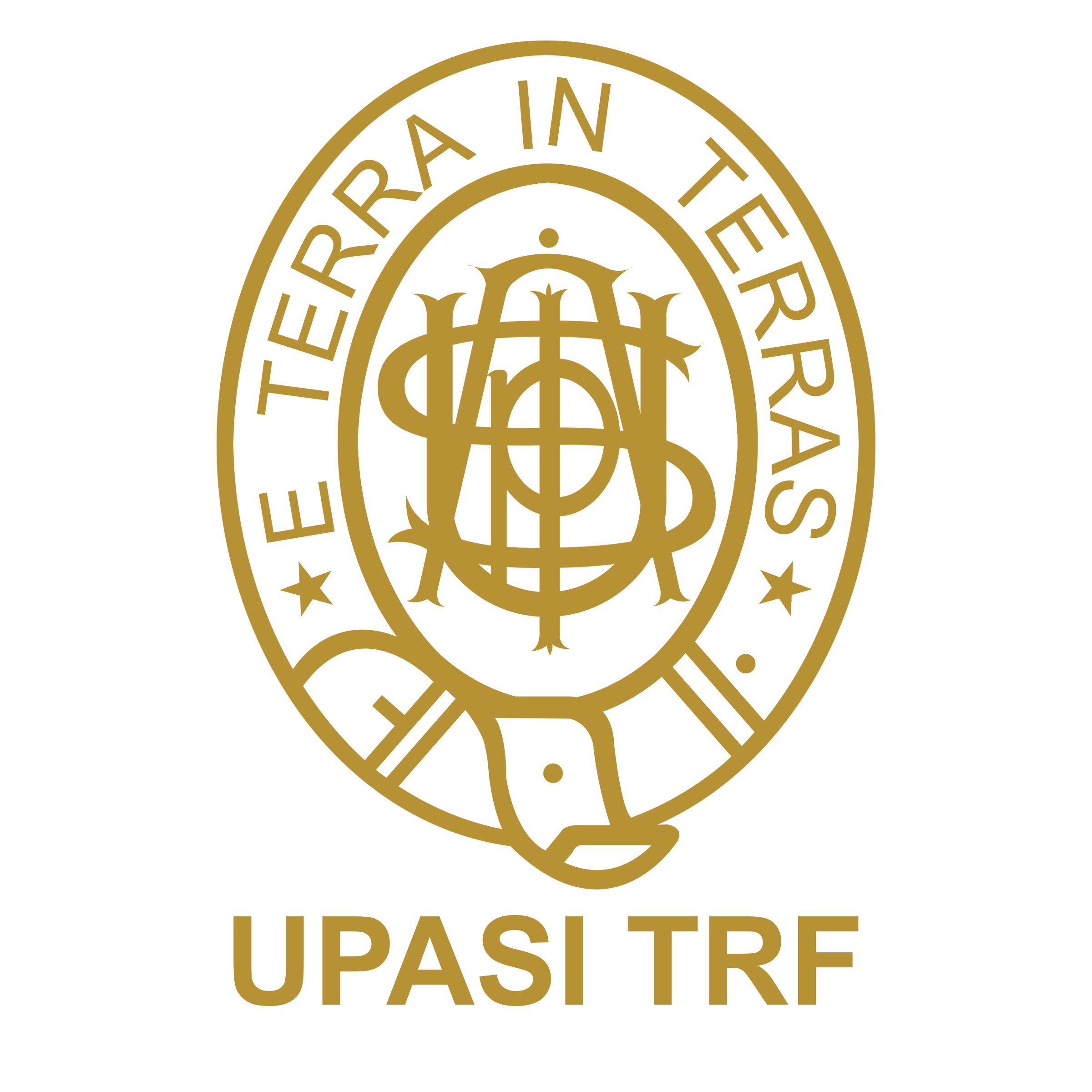
- Abbreviation: UPASI TRF
- Formation: October 1926; 100 years ago (as Tea Experimental Station, Gudalur); reconstituted as a Foundation in 1999
- Type: Agricultural research institute
- Legal status: Trust
- Purpose: Research and advisory services for the tea industry of South India
- Headquarters: UPASI Tea Research Institute, Valparai
- Location: Valparai, Coimbatore district, Tamil Nadu, India
- Region served: Tamil Nadu, Kerala, Karnataka
- Parent organization: United Planters' Association of Southern India (UPASI)
- Affiliations: Tea Board of India, Ministry of Commerce and Industry (India)
- Website: www.upasitearesearch.org

The UPASI Tea Research Foundation (UPASI TRF) is an agricultural research organisation based in Coonoor, Nilgiris district, Tamil Nadu, India, that conducts research on the cultivation, production and processing of tea for the plantation industry of southern India. It operates as the research wing of the United Planters' Association of Southern India (UPASI) and is one of three principal tea research bodies recognised by the Tea Board of India, alongside the Tea Research Association (Tocklai). The Ministry of Commerce and Industry, Government of India, through Tea Board, finances the industry-based tea research institutes viz., Tea Research Association (TRA) and UPASI Tea Research Foundation to undertake research work on various tea-related areas.

UPASI TRF's main research campus, the Tea Research Institute (TRI), is located near the Nirar Dam in the Anamalai Hills, Valparai, Coimbatore district, while its administrative office is at Coonoor. The Foundation operates an agricultural extension network for delivering its scientific services to tea growers across Tamil Nadu, Kerala, and Karnataka with Regional (Advisory) Centres located at Coonoor, Gudalur, Koppa, Munnar, Meppadi, and Vandiperiyar.

== History ==
Organised tea research by the United Planters' Association of Southern India dates to a Tea Experimental Station established in 1926 at Devarshola near Gudalur, Nilgiris with Dr. W.S. Shaw as the first Chief Scientific Officer. In 1999, UPASI reconstituted the department as a separate, formally administered body named Tea Research Foundation, with representation from the Ministry of Commerce and Industry and the Tea Board of India on its governing board, in order to give scientific research on tea cultivation, production and processing a dedicated administrative structure.

Since 1999, UPASI TRF's research institute has received recurring government funding, administered through the Tea Board of India as grant-in-aid from the Ministry of Commerce and Industry, supplemented by membership subscriptions and project-specific grants from other government agencies. Government of India supports UPASI Tea Research Foundation by contributing 49 per cent of their annual expenditure on certain approved administrative items subject to a specified ceiling, from the Plan Budget of Tea Board.

== Organisation and Governance ==
UPASI TRF is governed by a Board of Trustees of up to 15 members, nominated by the executive committee of UPASI together with government-nominated representatives: two from the Ministry of Commerce and three from the Tea Board of India, including the Tea Board's Chairman. Day-to-day administration is carried out by a Management Committee drawn from the Board of Trustees, with the Foundation's Director as an ex officio member and UPASI's Secretary General serving as Secretary to the Foundation.

The Foundation's research institute at Valparai is complemented by regional (advisory) centres serving tea-growing areas across Tamil Nadu, Kerala and Karnataka, including Coonoor, Gudalur, Koppa, Munnar, Meppadi and Vandiperiyar.

== Research ==
UPASI TRF conducts research on tea breeding, crop improvement, soil and nutrient management, plant protection, food safety and climate adaptation for the tea industry. Since the 2000s, UPASI TRI has expanded its research to include climate change adaptation, precision agriculture and tea genomics. Its long-term meteorological observations from plantation regions including Valparai and Munnar have been used in studies examining the effects of climate variability on tea cultivation and productivity in India.

=== Plant Breeding ===
UPASI TRF develops and releases clonal tea varieties for commercial cultivation in South India. Beginning with a germplasm collection programme initiated in 1963, the institute developed a series of commercially cultivated tea clones known as the "UPASI clones", several of which have been studied for their agronomic performance, biochemical characteristics and genetic diversity. By the early 2010s it had released more than 30 clones since the programme began. In 2012, the Foundation released the drought-tolerant, high-yielding clone TRF-5, a hybrid of TRI-2025 and UPASI-21 developed after roughly 25 years of field trials at its Coonoor, Valparai and Anamalais research stations; the clone was registered with the Tea Board as an accepted variety for new planting and replanting. UPASI-bred clones such as UPASI-9, UPASI-2, UPASI-6, UPASI-20 and UPASI-26 are cultivated for characteristics including drought tolerance and adaptation to Nilgiri growing conditions, and continue to be referenced in tea agronomy literature.

=== Plant Pathology ===
Research undertaken at UPASI TRF has also focused on tea diseases, particularly blister blight (Exobasidium vexans), one of the most economically significant diseases affecting tea cultivation in South Asia. Studies conducted by scientists at the institute have investigated disease resistance, host-pathogen interactions and integrated disease management. UPASI TRF scientists have published field studies on biological and chemical control of tea diseases, including branch canker (Macrophoma theicola). It's research on blister blight resistance in South Indian tea clones has been cited in the wider plant pathology literature on tea diseases, including a review published in the American Phytopathological Society journal Plant Disease. Research on molecular characterisation of tea clones using RAPD and ISSR markers has also appeared in the International Journal of Tea Science.

=== Entomology ===
Entomological research has been a core area of work at the institute, addressing arthropod pests of tea in southern India including the red spider mite, tea mosquito bug, and thrips. Research by UPASI TRF entomologists on the natural enemies of tea pests occurring in southern India, published in the journal ''Insect Science and its Application'' in 1988, is among the foundation's major contributions in the global tea entomology literature. The tea mosquito bug (Helopeltis spp.) is a major sap-sucking pest of tea addressed through UPASI TRF research spanning several decades, including early work by G.N. Rao on its control published in the UPASI Tea Science Department Bulletin in 1970, which is a foundational historical reference in later studies covering "Helopeltis" management not only in tea but in other crops such as cashew. UPASI TRF has also studied thrips species affecting tea, including "Scirtothrips bispinosus". UPASI TRF's pest management research is popularly cited as standard reference point in studies on integrated tea pest management.

=== Plant Physiology and Biotechnology ===
UPASI TRF has contributed to the development of micropropagation and tissue culture protocols to facilitate the rapid multiplication of elite, high-yielding tea clones. These efforts laid the groundwork for systematic comparison between tissue-culture-raised (micropropagated) plants and conventional, vegetatively propagated tea plants and demonstrated that micropropagated tea plants can match or exceed conventionally propagated counterparts in critical parameters. UPASI TRF has prioritized the study of tea plant physiology under water-deficit conditions and mapped the distinct variations in the tea metabolome under varying temperature and water stress regimes. The institute has utilized molecular biology tools to assist in variety identification, characterize plant pathogens, and map the genetic diversity of South Indian tea. The institute's elite germplasm has served as a primary reference collection for marker-based population genetics in India. TRF scientists have applied RAPD and ISSR marker technologies to study agricultural pathology, including the molecular characterization of Pestalotiopsis species (a fungal pathogens responsible for grey blight disease in South Indian tea plantations) to enable precise disease diagnostic and management strategies.

=== Tea Technology ===
UPASI TRF has extensively conducted research into the biochemistry of black tea processing, including the fermentation and withering stages of manufacture. UPASI TRF scientists have also worked on tea processing technologies beyond conventional black tea manufacture.

=== Soil Chemistry ===
TRF scientists have conducted research on the composition and management of soils in South Indian tea-growing districts, including studies on soil organic matter, micronutrient toxicity, and macronutrient uptake by tea plants. It has developed a methodology for extracting and characterising humic and fulvic acid fractions from lateritic soils under tea cultivation were carried out, correlating the extracted fractions with soil nutrient content and productivity. Structural, physiological, and biochemical responses of tea plantlets to critical micronutrient were also studies under Soil Chemistry.

=== Pesticide Residue ===
The institute has also undertaken research on pesticide residues, tea quality and food safety, publishing studies on residue monitoring in South Indian tea and methods to improve compliance with international food safety standards.

=== Laboratory Accreditation ===
UPASI TRF's laboratory at its Coonoor Regional Centre is accredited by the National Accreditation Board for Testing and Calibration Laboratories (NABL).

== Regional Advisory Centres ==
Alongside its research activities, UPASI Tea Research Foundation (UPASI TRF) operates an agricultural extension network directed at both estate-sector planters and smallholder tea growers across Tamil Nadu, Kerala, and Karnataka. This network comprises Regional (Advisory) Centres located at Coonoor, Gudalur, Koppa, Munnar, Meppadi, and Vandiperiyar, which advise on cultivation, plant protection, crop production, and processing, and are staffed with advisory officers who conduct field visits, training, laboratory analysis and field trials for tea estates in their respective districts.

== Role in Indian Tea Research ==
UPASI TRF's area of work covers the tea-growing tracts of Tamil Nadu, Kerala and Karnataka. The Nilgiris tract, advised in part by UPASI TRF's Coonoor Regional Centre, produces predominantly orthodox tea graded under the "Nilgiris" geographical indication, registered with the Tea Board of India in 2007-2008.

Alongside the Tea Research Association (Tocklai) which is the oldest and largest tea research institute in the world, serving Assam and North Bengal, UPASI TRF is the only body conducting applied tea research in Southern states of India viz., Karnataka, Tamil Nadu and Kerala. The institute conducts research on various aspects including cultivation techniques, tea quality, pest management and climate resilience. Increases in Indian tea productivity from roughly 424 kg/ha in 1900 to about 2,153 kg/ha in 2017 have been attributed in tea-science literature partly to the research programmes of Tocklai, UPASI TRF and other institutes.

== See also ==
- United Planters' Association of Southern India
- Karnataka Planters Association
- Central Travancore Planters' Association
- Nilgiri Planters' Association
- Tea Board of India
- Nilgiri tea
