= Planters' Association of Tamil Nadu =

- Abbreviation: PAT
- Formation: 1954
- Type: State-level planters' association
- Purpose: Represents tea, coffee, rubber, cardamom and other plantation owners in Tamil Nadu
- Headquarters: Coimbatore, Tamil Nadu, India
- Region served: Tamil Nadu, India
- Website: http://planterstn.org/

The Planters' Association of Tamil Nadu (PAT) is a state-level trade association representing owners of tea, coffee, rubber and cardamom plantations in the Indian state of Tamil Nadu. It is affiliated to the United Planters' Association of Southern India (UPASI), and is headquartered in Coimbatore, Tamil Nadu.

== History ==
The Planters' Association of Tamil Nadu traces its origins to a reorganisation of UPASI's structure in the period immediately following Indian independence. According to historical accounts of UPASI, the prospect of the Central Government's linguistic reorganisation of Indian states in the mid-1950s, together with new pressures such as the possible imposition of agricultural income tax on plantations, prompted UPASI to devolve many of its labour-relations and general planting functions to autonomous state-level bodies rather than retain them centrally. Separate state Planters' Associations were accordingly formed for the Madras State, the former princely state of Travancore-Cochin, and the combined state of Mysore and Coorg, while UPASI itself retained industry-wide coordination and representation functions. The Madras State body was PAT's institutional predecessor.

PAT was formed in the year 1954 in anticipation of the separate linguistic State for Tamil Nadu. PAT's historical base for several decades earlier had been in Coonoor, in the Nilgiris district which was relocated to Coimbatore later. Planters' Association of Tamil Nadu is treated by government, trade unions and researchers alike as the principal industry interlocutors for plantation labour and wage questions in the state.

== Role and activities ==
The Planters' Association of Tamil Nadu is one of the state-level bodies, alongside those for Kerala and Karnataka, affiliated to the regional apex body United Planters' Association of Southern India (UPASI). PAT represents corporate and individual growers of tea, coffee, rubber and cardamom across several districts of Tamil Nadu. PAT represents plantation owners before the government of Tamil Nadu in labour and industrial matters concerning the state's plantation sector.

A 1990s academic survey of the Tamil Nadu tea industry recorded that the state's roughly 38,000 hectares of Tea Board-registered tea holdings and approximately 97,000 permanent plantation workers were concentrated mainly in the Nilgiris and Coimbatore districts, the same geographic base in which PAT-affiliated estates operate.

== See also ==
- United Planters' Association of Southern India
- Karnataka Planters Association
- Nilgiri Planters' Association
- Central Travancore Planters' Association
