= North Eastern Tea Association =

Indian manufacturer's group

- Abbreviation: NETA
- Formation: 1981; 45 years ago
- Headquarters: G.F. Road Begenekhowa; Golaghat
- Region served: Assam, India
- Members: 170
- Official language: Assamese, English
- Chairman: Kamal Jalan
- Parent organization: Committee of Plantation Associations (CCPA)

The North Eastern Tea Association (NETA) is an association of tea producers' headquartered in Golaghat, Upper-Assam in the state of Assam, India. It is a constituent member of the Joint Forum and the Consultative Committee of Plantation Associations (CCPA), Assam Valley branch. The association promotes interests of its members, in addition to playing a pivotal for the enrichment of the tea industry in Assam.

== History ==
NETA was formed in the year 1981 in Golaghat. The organization issues advice and the consensus of professional opinions' of tea producers to its members and associated groups, and to the government about current issues as they arise pertaining to Assam's tea industry, besides making various suggestions to the government for the betterment and the upscaling of the industry sector.

== Activities ==
The organization has made numerous suggestions to the Government of Assam for the upscaling the tea industry in the region. NETA has recently suggested to move the Tea Board of India's head office to Guwahati on the basis of the fact that the other five statutory Commodity Boards under the Department of Commerce, Govt. of India – Tea, Coffee, Rubber, Spices and Tobacco are headquartered in the State where the product is mainly grown. Although Assam produces 52.9% of the country's total tea production as opposed to Bengal which produces 24.8%, the Tea Board is headquartered in Kolkata (Calcutta).

NETA also urged the Tea Board to make an amendment in the definition of Small Tea Grower in order to accommodate the one who holds land up to 50.6 hectares as a small tea grower.

The organization also emphasizes on the growth of high quality tea from time to time and advises the tea planters and tea growers of the region to produce quality tea to attract buyers in the international markets.

== Structure ==
NETA has a large presence in Golaghat, Jorhat and Karbi Anglong districts. With 170 members, the organization has tea estates with factories, tea estates without factories (above 10.12 hectares) and bought leaf factories (BLFs) are under its membership fold. It is currently organized under 5 zonal divisions, with central zone in Golaghat, and other zonal offices in Dibrugarh, Jorhat etc.
