= Karnataka Planters Association =

Karnataka Planters' Association
- Abbreviation: KPA
- Formation: 1958
- Type: Trade association
- Headquarters: Chikmagalur, Karnataka, India
- Website: http://www.kpa.org.in

The Karnataka Planters' Association (KPA) is a state-level trade body representing coffee, tea, pepper and cardamom growers of the Indian state of Karnataka. Headquartered in Chikmagalur, the association was formed in 1958, with members whose estates are situated in the plantation districts of Chikmagalur, Kodagu, Hassan, Chamarajanagar and Dakshina Kannada.

== History ==
The Karnataka Planters' Association (KPA) traces its institutional lineage to the Mysore Planters' Association, formed by European coffee planters in the princely state of Mysore. The origins of organised planter representation in the region that became Karnataka predate the state's own formation. Before the 1956 reorganisation of Indian states, planting interests in the area were represented by four separate bodies: the Coorg Planters' Association, the Coorg Indian Planters' Association, the Mysore Planters' Association, and the Indian Planters' Association of Chikmagalur. Following the merger of Coorg with the erstwhile Mysore State, members of these associations, who were also members of the apex body United Planters' Association of Southern India (UPASI), formed a single body to represent all plantations in the enlarged state. The new organisation was named the Mysore State Planters' Association and was headquartered at Chikmagalur; the older Mysore Planters' Association, after nearly a century of activity, merged into it, while the Coorg Planters' Association continued on as a district-level affiliate. When Mysore State was renamed Karnataka in 1973, the association adopted its present name, the Karnataka Planters' Association.

== Objectives and structure ==
The KPA functions as an association of individual plantation growers, partnership firms, companies and other members holding interests in coffee, tea, pepper and cardamom. It is led by an elected Executive Committee headed by a Chairman, generally elected at the association's Annual General Meeting. The KPA represents growers in Chikmagaluru, Hassan and Kodagu, the three districts that together account for more than 70 percent of India's total coffee production, and regularly makes representations to the Union and state governments on behalf of the plantation sector. The association also engaged with the Coffee Board of India and other industry bodies on matters pertaining to the plantation sector in Karnataka.

== Coffee research ==
Organised scientific research on coffee cultivation in the Mysore region began in the early twentieth century under Leslie Coleman, a Canadian-trained entomologist and plant pathologist appointed Mysore's first Director of Agriculture in 1913, having joined the state's agricultural department as mycologist and entomologist in 1908. Coleman worked with the Mysore Planters' Association on coffee pest and disease control and was involved in the drafting of the Diseases and Pests Act of 1917, India's first legislative attempt to manage agricultural pests, which made control of the white stem borer compulsory for coffee planters.

In 1925, the government of Mysore established the Coffee Experiment Station at Balehonnur in present-day Chikmagalur district, initially on land leased from a planter member of the association, with research conducted on coffee varieties and on pest and disease control. Coleman's own research there in the early 1930s included studies of coffee leaf rust, caused by the fungus Hemileia vastatrix. The Balehonnur station is described in coffee-industry sources as the origin point of organised coffee research in India. A temporary research unit addressing leaf disease had preceded it at Koppa in 1915.

The Balehonnur station was transferred to the Coffee Board of India, established under the Coffee Act of 1942, with regular research activity beginning there from 1944; the site subsequently developed into the Central Coffee Research Institute.

== Industry advocacy ==
KPA represents the interests of Karnataka's coffee, tea, and pepper planters on matters related to the industry. More recently, the association has engaged on issues including compliance with the European Union Deforestation Regultaion (EUDR) affecting coffee and rubber exporters.

== See also ==
- United Planters' Association of Southern India
- Nilgiri Planters' Association
- Coffee Board of India
- Tea Board of India
- Coffee production in India
