= United Planters' Association of Southern India =

Trade association in India

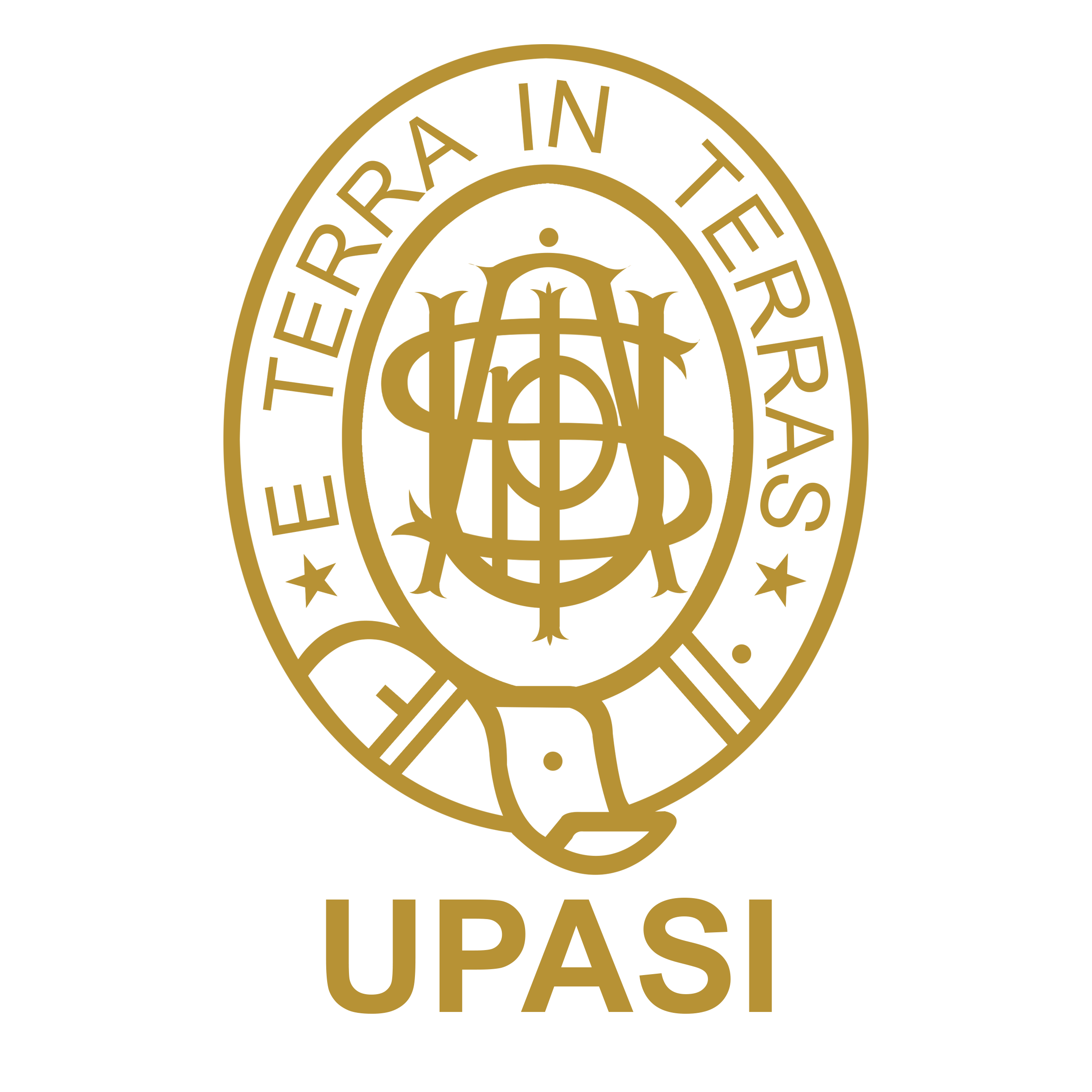
- Abbreviation: UPASI
- Formation: August 28, 1893; 133 years ago
- Founded at: Mayo Hall, Bangalore
- Type: Trade association
- Legal status: Association
- Purpose: Represents planters of tea, coffee, rubber, pepper, and cardamom in South India
- Headquarters: Glenview
- Location: Coonoor, Nilgiris district, Tamil Nadu, India
- Region served: Tamil Nadu, Kerala, Karnataka
- Members: 3 state planters' associations; 13 district planters' associations
- Affiliations: UPASI Tea Research Foundation
- Website: www.upasi.org

The United Planters' Association of Southern India (UPASI) is a trade association representing planters of tea, coffee, rubber, pepper, and cardamom in the south Indian states of Tamil Nadu, Kerala, and Karnataka. Founded in 1893 during British colonial rule, UPASI describes itself as an "apex body," made up of state and district-level planters' associations. Its headquarters, known as Glenview, is in Coonoor in the Nilgiris district of Tamil Nadu.

UPASI's stated activities span economic research, market intelligence, industrial relations, scientific research, and public policy advocacy for the plantation crop sector. It oversees the UPASI Tea Research Foundation, a dedicated scientific research body for the South Indian tea industry, and jointly organises "The Golden Leaf India Awards (TGLIA)" tea competition with the Tea Board of India.

== History ==
UPASI was formed on 28 August 1893, when representatives of thirteen district planting associations met at Mayo Hall in Bangalore to form a single, united organisation representing planting interests across the region. According to historian K. Ravi Raman, UPASI was established at the height of British colonial rule as an organisation dedicated to the interests of British planters, principally tea planters, in South India.

UPASI's scientific work dates to the early twentieth century. In collaboration with regional governments, it helped establish experimental and research stations for coffee, tea, and rubber in the 1900s-1920s, including a Coffee Experimental Station at Sidapur and a Tea Experimental Station at Peermade, and formally established its own Scientific Department during this period. A dedicated Tea Experimental Station was set up at Gudalur, Nilgiris in 1926, which evolved over subsequent decades into the present-day UPASI Tea Research Foundation, constituted in 1999.

A detailed institutional history, A Planting Century: The First Hundred Years of the United Planters' Association of Southern India, 1893-1993, was written by journalist and historian S. Muthiah and published to mark the organisation's centenary in 1993.

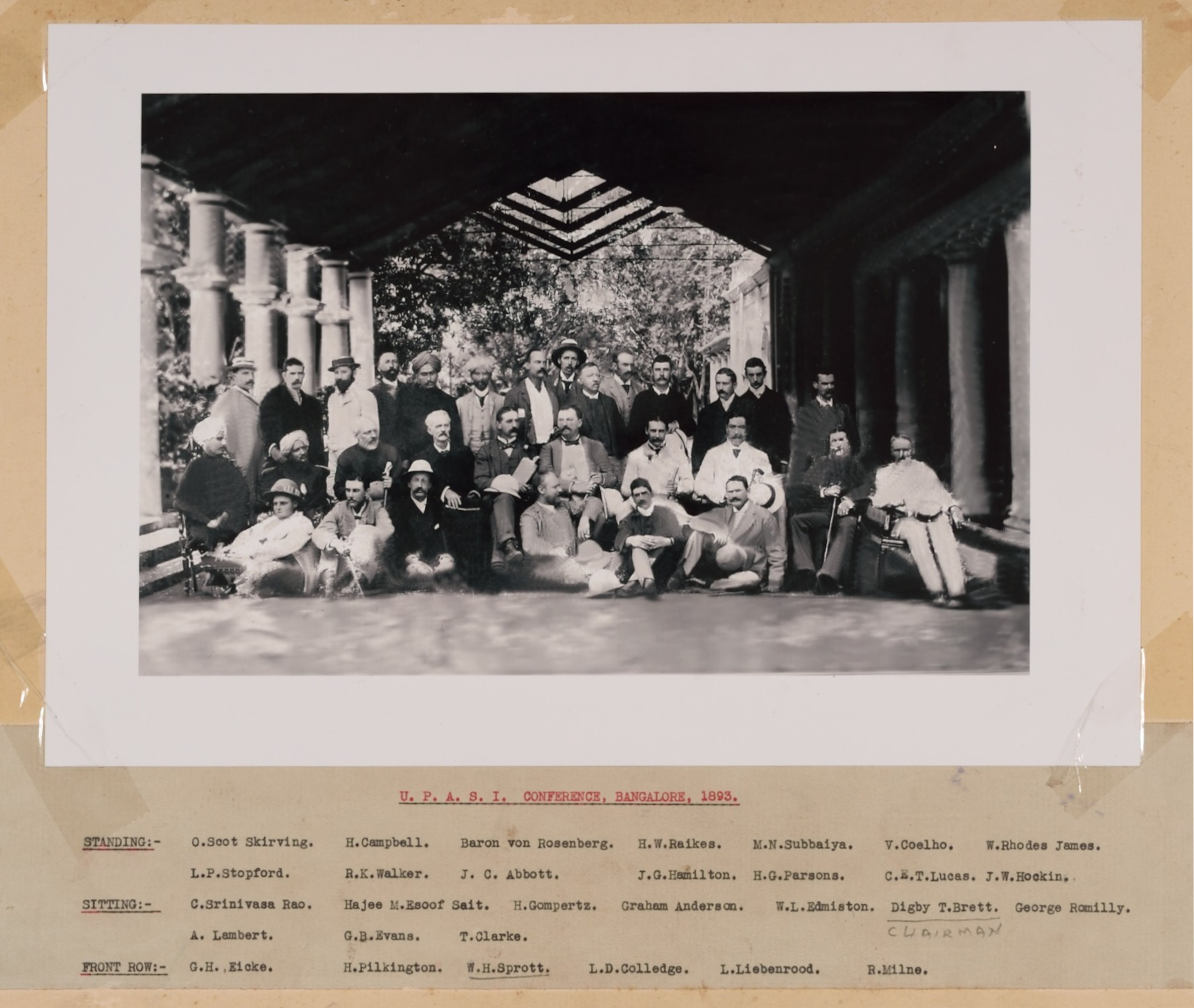
Founding members of UPASI during the conference in Bangalore in 1893

== Structure and activities ==
UPASI functions as a federation of three state planters' associations and thirteen district planters' associations across Tamil Nadu, Kerala, and Karnataka. Its stated objectives include undertaking scientific research relating to plantation crops, disseminating technical knowledge on cultivation and processing, representing planting-sector interests before government and policymakers, and collecting and publishing statistics on the plantation industries of South India.

UPASI publishes The Planters' Chronicle, a trade journal (successor to the earlier Planting Opinion, launched in 1895), and produces an annual UPASI Yearbook. Through its affiliated UPASI Tea Research Foundation, it conducts research and provides advisory services on tea cultivation, plant protection, and processing, and jointly organises the annual Golden Leaf India Awards tea competition with the Tea Board of India.

UPASI established a Krishi Vigyan Kendra (KVK) in the Nilgiris district in September 1982, with a mandate to support rural development among small tea growers alongside UPASI's estate-sector research activities. In 2000, the Tea Board of India designated UPASI-KVK as the nodal agency for small tea growers in the Nilgiris and launched, through it, a Quality Upgradation Programme (QUP) aimed at improving the standard of tea produced by smallholders in the district. A follow-on Factory Upgradation Programme (FUP), also administered by UPASI-KVK from 2001, provided bought-leaf factories support towards equipment upgradation along with training to help factories attain ISO and HACCP certification. Later, the UPASI KVK was closed following the discontinuation of its collaborative framework with the Indian Council of Agricultural Research.

A study by the V.V. Giri National Labour Institute on family labour in the small-holding plantation sector situates UPASI among the institutional actors supporting the roughly 60,000 smallholders who, as of the mid-2000s, contributed around 40 percent of total South Indian tea production in the Nilgiris.

== Tea ==
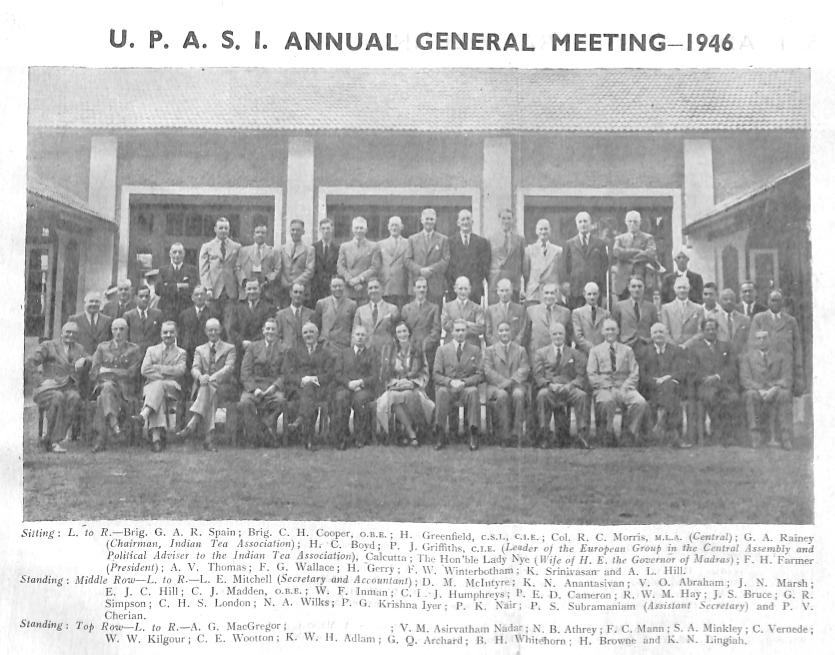
UPASI Annual general Meeting - 1946

Tea has historically been one of the principal plantation crops represented by the United Planters' Association of Southern India (UPASI). Since its formation in 1893, the association has represented tea plantation interests across southern India, functioning as a federation of regional planting associations and serving as an industry body on matters relating to cultivation, labour, research and public policy.

Organised tea research in South India starts with the establishment of UPASI's Tea Experimental Station in 1926 at Devarshola near Gudalur, Nilgiris with Dr. W.S. Shaw as the first Chief Scientific Officer. In 1999, UPASI reconstituted the department as a separate, formally administered body named UPASI Tea Research Foundation, with representation from the Ministry of Commerce and Industry and the Tea Board of India on its governing board. The UPASI Tea Research Foundation is one of three principal tea research bodies recognised by the Tea Board of India.

UPASI has also commissioned and supported studies on labour availability and mechanisation in the tea sector. Research undertaken by the association and its Tea Research Foundation has been cited in analyses of labour shortages in South Indian plantations and the changing economics of tea production.

== Coffee ==
Since its establishment, the UPASI has been closely associated with the development of coffee cultivation and research in southern India. During the late nineteenth and early twentieth centuries, the association represented the interests of coffee plantation owners and advocated scientific methods to improve cultivation and disease management. UPASI played an important role in promoting organized coffee research. According to the Coffee Board of India, the association initiated one of the earliest coordinated efforts towards scientific coffee research in the 1900s, which eventually led to the establishment of the Mysore Coffee Experimental Station at Balehonnur in 1925. The association worked with scientists including Dr. Leslie Coleman, Rudolph Anstead and Gustav Hermann Krumbiegel in developing research programmes for coffee cultivation.

During the colonial period, UPASI also represented coffee planters before government committees dealing with production, marketing and export policy. It participated alongside the Coffee Cess Act Committee and the Coffee Market Expansion Board during efforts to address the crisis of surplus coffee production, institutions that later evolved into the Coffee Board of India.

== Rubber ==
UPASI was also closely involved in the early development of India's natural rubber industry. During the early twentieth century, the association encouraged the establishment and expansion of rubber plantations in southern India, particularly in Travancore, and Malabar, and supported the spread of plantation-based agriculture through infrastructure development and technical assistance. UPASI's "Planting Directory", published periodically during the twentieth century, has been used extensively by historians as a primary source documenting the growth of plantations.

The association also promoted scientific research on rubber cultivation. Under the leadership of John Joseph Murphy (rubber planter), UPASI established a Rubber Scientific Department and founded one of India's earliest dedicated rubber research facilities at Mundakayam in 1924. Research undertaken there contributed to controlling fungal diseases such as ''Phytophthora meadii'', which had affected rubber plantations in southern India.

== See also ==
- UPASI Tea Research Foundation
- Karnataka Planters Association
- Nilgiri Planters' Association
- Central Travancore Planters' Association
- Indian Tea Association
- Tea Board of India
- Coffee Board of India
- Rubber Board
- Spices Board of India
