= Nilgiri tea =

Black tea from Nilgiris district in Tamil Nadu, India

- Geographical indication
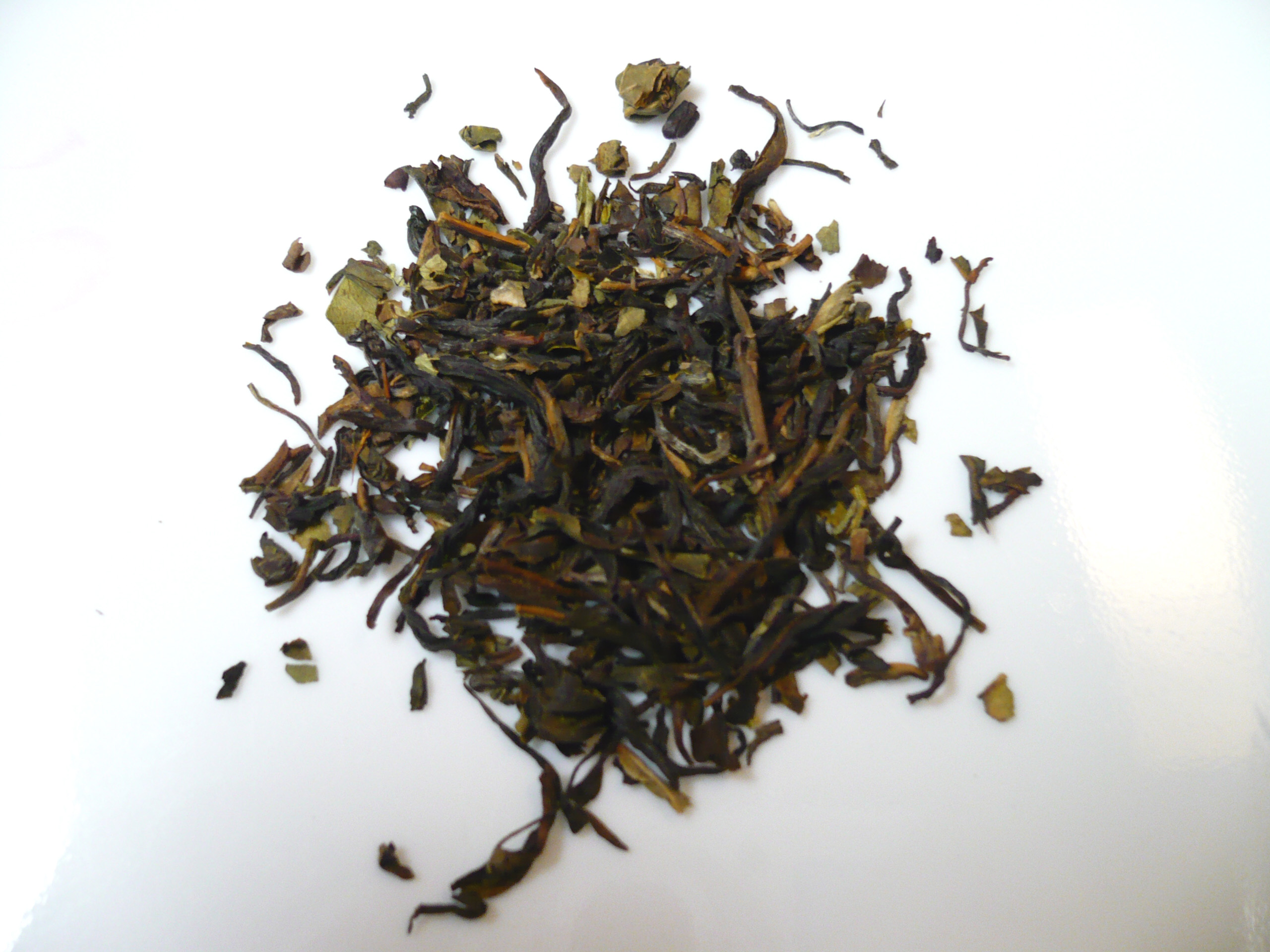
- Nilgiri black tea leaves
- Type: Black tea
- Area: Nilgiris, Tamil Nadu, India
- Country: India
- Registered: 2008

Nilgiri
- Type: Black tea
- Other names: Blue Mountain tea
- Origin: Nilgiris, Tamil Nadu, India
- Quick description: Brisk and fragrant
- Temperature: 90 °C (194 °F) to 95 °C (203 °F)
- Time: 3 to 4 minutes

Nilgiri tea is a drink made by infusing leaves of Camellia sinensis that is grown and processed in the Nilgiris district in Tamil Nadu, India. The leaves are processed as black tea, though some estates have expanded their product offerings to include leaves suitable for making green, white and oolong teas. It is generally described as being a brisk, fragrant and full-bodied tea. The region produces both rolled and crush, tear, curl tea and it is predominantly used for blending. Nilgiri tea is also used for making iced tea and instant tea.

Camellia sinensis var. sinensis was introduced to Nilgiri Mountains by the British in 1835 from seeds shipped from China. Commercial production commenced in the 1860s, where the industry would evolve to include a mixture of many small growers with a few large corporate estates and the government-owned Tamil Nadu Tea Plantation established for the purpose of assisting in repatriating Indian Tamils from Sri Lanka. Its fertile soils located on well-drained slopes with geography that brings two monsoons per year with periods of fog and humid, cold weather, allow the sinensis variety to thrive. The tea is of sufficient quality and uniqueness to warrant being a registered geographical indication.

== History ==
Camellia sinensis was first planted in the Nilgiri area in 1835. The British had been using the area as a hill station and, as they had been seeking to create a source of tea outside of China, shipped seeds there, as well as various locations across southern India, for experimental plantings. Botanist George Samuel Perrottet planted the seeds in the governor's garden in Ketti. Though they were not well-cared for, they did survive to be later propagated. The Thiashola estate, established in 1859, was one of the first tea estates in the region though commercial tea production began in 1862, and by 1904 there was over 3,200 hectares (7,900 acres) of tea under cultivation (second only to coffee which had three times as much land under cultivation). However, the plantations were largely operated by retired European military and civil servants, with labour from the native tribal people, all with little knowledge of tea production. Many early plantations failed but with the assistance of Chinese tea-makers brought in by the British, the industry was able to develop. European planters (of both coffee and tea) formed the Nilgiri Planters' Association which joined the United Planters' Association of Southern India (UPASI) in 1894 to advocate for foreign interests in land and financing. In what would become one of the largest holdings in Nilgiri tea, Robert Stanes founded the United Nilgiri Tea Estates Company in 1922 from the Allada Valley estate, with the Chamraj and Rockland estates added in 1923, Devabetta in 1926, and Kodery in 1928.

Following Indian independence in 1947, the British began to sell their interests in tea gardens to Indian owners and the 1953 Tea Act put the tea industry under the regulatory jurisdiction of the Tea Board of India. While a tea auction was established in Coonoor in 1963, the Soviet bloc countries became the primary customers of tea from the region, taking about 80% of Nilgiri tea from the 1970s to 1990s. To accommodate Soviet preferences for mass-produced lower-cost teas, processing methods shifted to production of Crush, Tear, Curl and instant tea. More processing factories were built and cooperative agreements, such as Indcoserve, were made to accommodate small holders.

Laborers plucking tea leaves in Coonoor, Nilgiris

There was an increase in production during the 1970s as the Sirima–Shastri Pact brought in many repatriated Indian Tamils of Sri Lanka to the region and the Tamil Nadu Tea Plantation Corporation was established as a government-operated tea garden to provide for their transition. Of the small farm growers, the majority belong to the Badagas community. A crop diversification program initiated in the 1980s by the UPASI and the Tea Board saw many small holders move into the tea industry, resulting in nearly doubling the amount of land under tea cultivation by 2000. As the economies of the Soviet countries began to waver later in the 1980s, the Nilgiri Planters' Association led efforts to encourage estates and small growers to reform cultivation and processing practices to accommodate the preferences of the Western market. They tested new clonal varieties, moved to produce orthodox-rolled teas and white teas, began marketing single-origin estate teas, and encouraged maintaining certification of social and environmental practices. The Tea Board of India created a trademark for use on tea that is produced solely in Nilgiri and attained geographical indication status in 2008.

== Geography, cultivation and processing ==
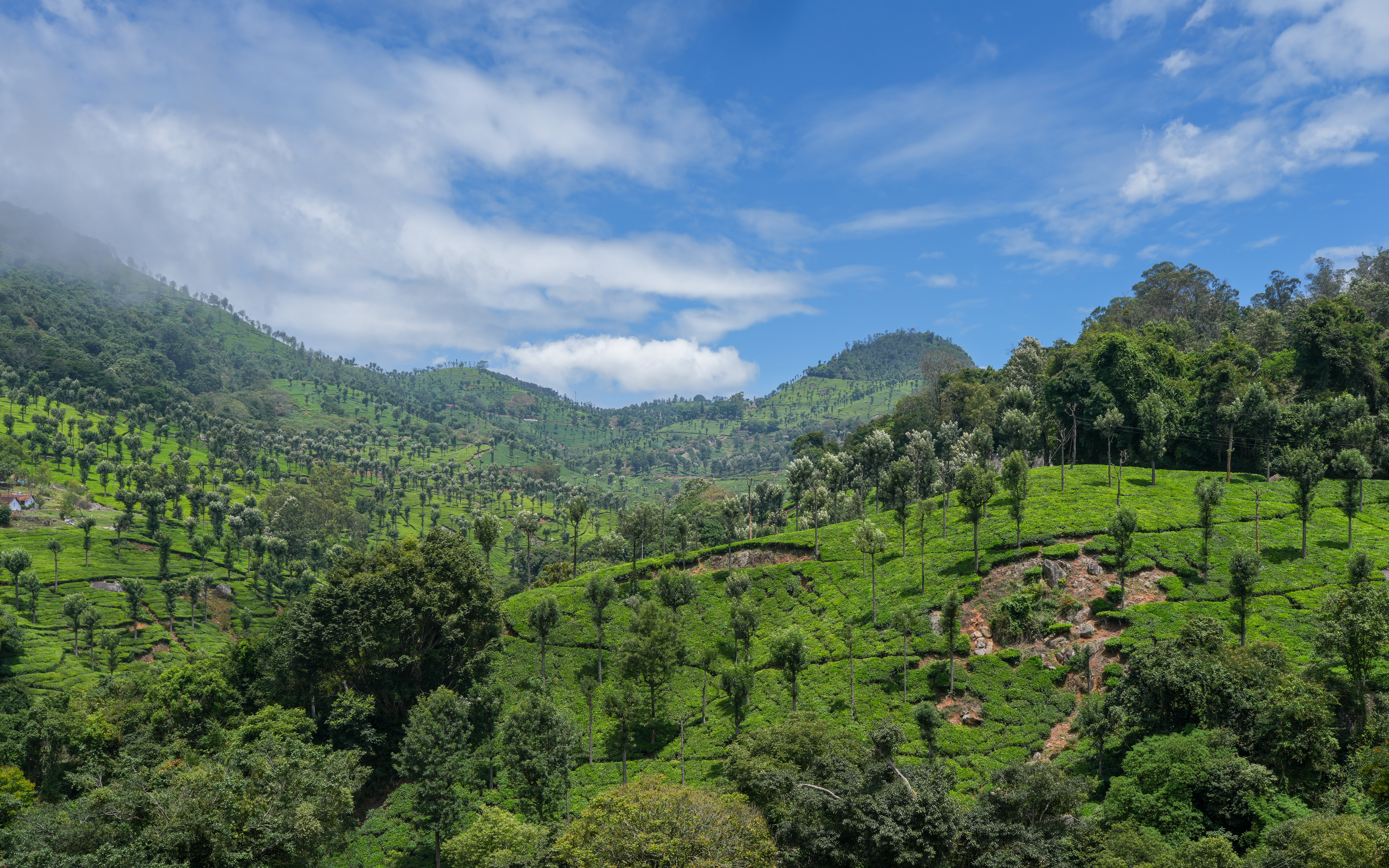
Tea estate below Coonoor, Nilgiris

While Camellia sinensis is cultivated in areas across the southern tip of India in the states of Tamil Nadu, Kerala and Karnataka, Nilgiri tea, and is defined as that which is cultivated and processed in District of Nilgiris, constitutes about half this area's total production. The Nilgiri Mountains form the border between the states of Tamil Nadu, Kerala and Karnataka, but are predominantly within the District of Nilgiris, Tamil Nadu. Located within the Western Ghats mountain range and the Nilgiri Biosphere Reserve, the Nilgiri tea growing areas range between 1,000 and 2,500 metres in elevation and are exposed to the Southwest Monsoon weather from the Malabar Coast from June to September, followed by the Northeast Monsoon in October to November. The resulting alternating periods of fog and direct sunlight, as well as the South Western Ghats montane rain forests soils, described as lateritic loam, on the hillsides provides the high elevation drainage and conditions needed for Camellia sinensis var. sinensis to thrive.

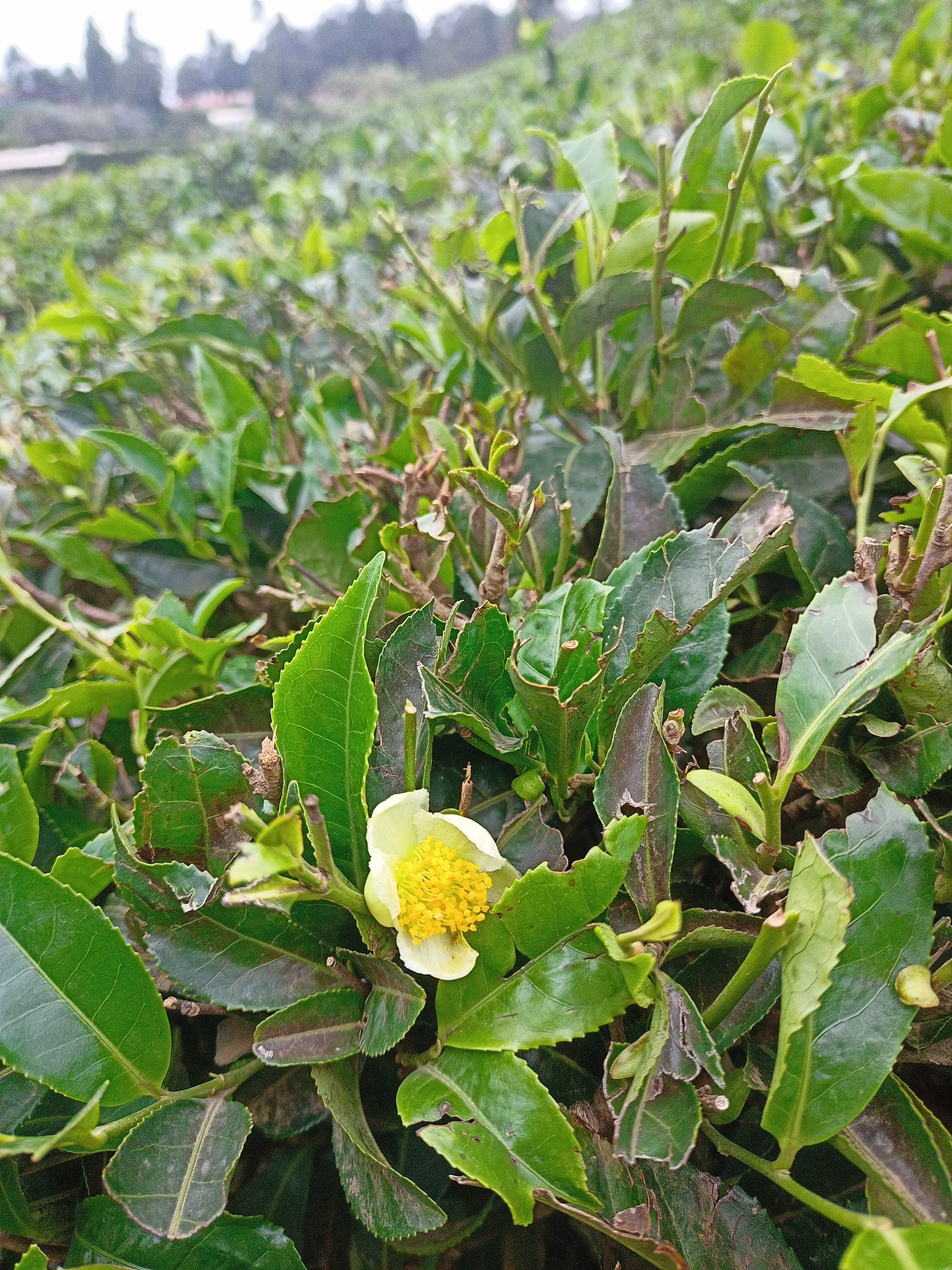
In an estate near Doddabetta

Cultivation of tea in the Nilgiri region is conducted on few large corporate holdings, many small farms and the government-owned Tamil Nadu Tea Plantation Corporation. The small holders, typically under 1 hectare, vary widely in their practices, such as soil management, use of shade trees, ground cover, fertilizers and pesticides, plant age, etc. However, common to the region, plucking can occur approximately every 10 days almost all year round, typically 32 annual pluckings per plant. As opposed to the assamica variety, the sinensis variety requires a period of dormancy; in Nilgiris there is a short dormancy period during the cold temperatures of December–January. The first leaves after the dormancy are some of the plant's most flavourful as they contain a higher concentration of defensive compounds secreted during the cold weather. This first harvest, plucked from January to March, is referred to as "frost tea" since it is collected in relatively cold but humid weather.

The larger estates own and operate their own processing facilities for drying, rolling, oxidizing and sorting the leaves. There are numerous independent or cooperatively-owned processing facilities ("bought leaf factories") that buy green leaves from the small farms, with price and quality levels prescribed by the Tea Board of India. The processed leaves ("made tea"), that are not otherwise purchased on a contract basis, are sold at tea auctions in Coonoor, Coimbatore and Kochi. These factories predominantly produce black tea, but some also produce limited quantities of specialty white, green and oolong teas. Of the black tea produced, most use the crush, tear, curl (CTC) method though since the 2000s, as Argentina and Vietnam took more CTC market share, orthodox (e.g. rolled) teas have also been produced.

== Flavour and blends ==
Nilgiri tea is known for its briskness, referring to lively fragrant flavours, a quality attributed to its climatic growing conditions. Nilgiri tea is variously described as being light but full-bodied or well-rounded in flavour, with fruit, like citrus, and floral notes. Its orthodox tea is compared to Ceylon teas which grow under similar conditions, such as two monsoons. Its light but fragrant liquor makes it useful for blending and it can be found in brands of bagged tea and blended with Assam tea in masala chai. Chemically, Nilgiri tea has been shown to be higher in quinic acid and lower in tannins than other black teas.

Nilgiri tea is particularly useful for making iced tea since it retains its clarity as it cools, whereas other black teas will often become cloudy. Global commercial brands, such as Nestea, utilize Nilgiri tea in their iced tea products that use real tea.

== See also ==
- Nilgiri Planters' Association
- United Planters' Association of Southern India
- Assam tea
- Darjeeling tea
- Indian Tea Association
