= Puttady =

- Village
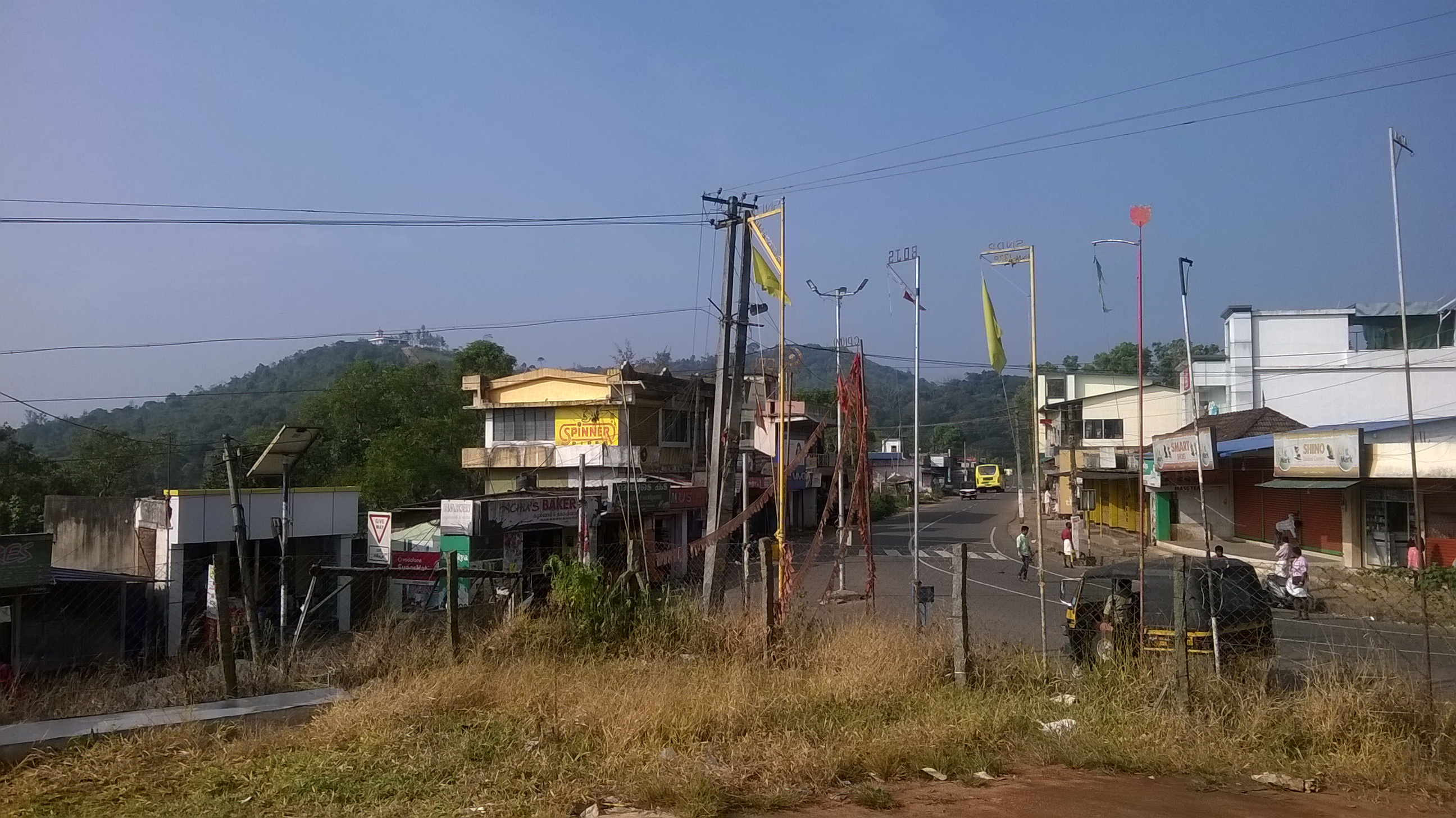
- Puttady (Idukki)

- Location in Kerala, India
- Coordinates: 9.666°N 77.161°E
- Country: India
- State: Kerala
- District: Idukki district
- Elevation: 900 m (3,000 ft)

Languages
  - Official: Malayalam, Tamil, English
- Time zone: UTC+5:30 (IST)
- PIN: 685551
- Telephone code: 04868
- Vehicle registration: KL-69

Puttady is a town in Idukki district of Kerala, India. The Spice Park of Spices Board India for cardamom and pepper is situated at Puttady.

== Etymology ==
The word Puttady comes from Putu which means New and Adi meaning village in Old Tamil / Malayalam language. An alternative meaning is Puttu (Anthill), hence puttady means a place having anthill. According to folk stories, this place is named after the famous Sri Devi Temple, Puttadi {Ref http://www.keralatemples.net/idk_comb.html}

== History ==
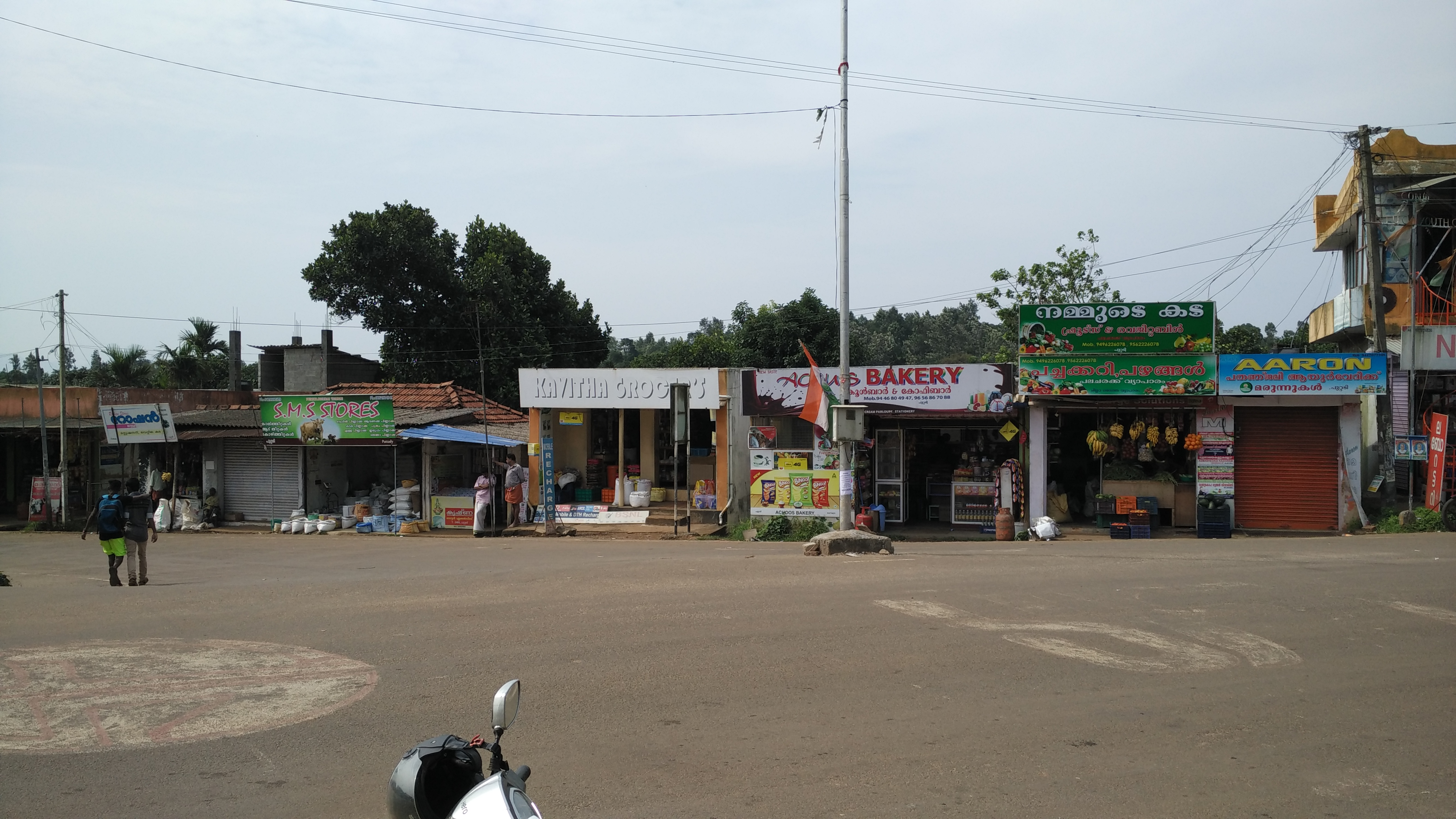
Puttady

There are proofs that Puttady and adjoining areas have been occupied since ancient times. Earthen pots belonging to ancient cultures have been unearthed at NSPHS playground but were subsequently damaged due to negligence. Chankurandan mala cave (en route [Kumily], 3 km from Puttadi stands as an example for ancient culture and the famous [Hanuman] temple. Kalumel kal is another such example (according to local folks, this was kept by [Bhima] among [Pandava] princes to crus [aricanuts]. Vera kalu (hero stone) is also present at Kochera 5 km from Puttady
