= Central Travancore Planters' Association =

- Abbreviation: CTPA
- Formation: 1874 (as the Peermade Planters' Association); renamed c. 1894
- Type: District planters' association
- Headquarters: Vandiperiyar, Idukki district, Kerala, India

The Central Travancore Planters' Association (CTPA) is a district-level planters' association representing tea, coffee, rubber, cardamom and pepper growers in the Peermade-Vandiperiyar region of Idukki district, Kerala, India. It is one of the oldest surviving planters' associations in India, tracing its origin to the Peermade Planters' Association founded in 1874, and is based at the Vandiperiyar Club near Vandiperiyar.

== History ==
=== Founding as the Peermade Planters' Association ===
Organised coffee planting in the Peermade hills of the erstwhile Kingdom of Travancore began in the 1860s, following land clearance led by descendants of the missionary Henry Baker and by the Munro family, after whom the area's earliest coffee estates were developed. As the number of resident planters in Peermade grew through the early 1870s, they formed a local body to represent their common interests. According to the book Above Heron's Pool by Heather Lovatt and Peter de Jong, the Peermade Planters' Association was established in 1874 at the suggestion of planters Harry Clarke and F. M. Parker. The association's first office was located at "Mount", near Vandiperiyar, before later shifting to Vandiperiyar itself.

Coffee cultivation in Peermade was severely affected by an outbreak of coffee leaf rust (Hemileia vastatrix), which had first appeared in Ceylon in the late 1860s and reached the Ashambu hills and Peermade by the mid-1870s; by 1886 only twelve planters remained in the hills. Growers experimented with substitute crops, including cinchona, tea, cardamom and rubber, before tea emerged as the most suitable crop for the Peermade elevation, with seed obtained from the Nilgiris. By 1906, roughly 8,000 acres in Central Travancore were under tea compared with only about 500 acres of coffee.

=== Renaming to the Central Travancore Planters' Association ===
As tea plantations in Peerumade gained prominence across southern India following the coffee blight, G. L. Ackworth, owner of the Arnakal estate and secretary of the Peermade Planters' Association, proposed renaming the body to give greater visibility to Travancore and its emerging tea industry. The association was accordingly reconstituted as the Central Travancore Planters' Association. Until 1950, the association's office-bearers were drawn exclusively from British planters resident in the region. The association's early institutional history is also documented in two commemorative volumes it published, The Central Travancore Planters' Association Centenary Souvenir, 1874-1974 (Kottayam, 1974) and an earlier 1970 souvenir containing Usha Joseph's essay "History of the Central Travancore Planters' Association," both of which have been cited in peer-reviewed historical scholarship on South Indian planting associations.

=== Institutional and Social Welfare ===
The CTPA played an early role in plantation labour welfare in the region. In 1910, it initiated a medical fund scheme for plantation workers, which the Travancore Tea Estates Company was among the first two plantation companies to join. In 1925, the association campaigned to improve the nutritional content of estate workers' daily diet, and in 1929 it became the first employers' organisation in India to recommend maternity benefits for women workers, ahead of such benefits being made a statutory requirement. The association also supported the recognition of the first workers' union in the area in 1931.

=== 150th anniversary ===
The CTPA marked its 150th anniversary with a celebration at the Vandiperiyar Club on 12 February 2025.

== Organisation ==
The CTPA is a district-level member association affiliated to the Association of Planters of Kerala (APK), the state-level planters' body, which represents about 60 percent of Kerala's organised plantation sector through six district planters' associations, three commodity growers' associations, and firm members. The APK itself was formed in 1939 as the Association of Planters of Travancore and took its present name after the formation of the state of Kerala on 27 September 1957. The United Planters' Association of Southern India (UPASI), the apex body for planters in South India, established a tea research substation at Vandiperiyar in 1964 specifically to serve tea planters of the Peermedu and Central Travancore area, reflecting the concentration of tea estates historically represented by the CTPA.

== See also ==
- United Planters' Association of Southern India
- Nilgiri Planters' Association
- Tea Board of India
