= Coffee Board of India =

Agricultural trade organisation

- (IAST: Bhāratiya Coffee Board)
- Abbreviation: CBoI
- Formation: 1942 (84 years ago)
- Type: Government
- Legal status: Government Organization
- Purpose: promote to Coffee Production in India
- Location: Bengaluru, India
- Origins: All India
- Region served: India
- Products: Coffee
- Chairman: Sri. M. J. Dinesh
- Chief Executive Officer & Secretary: Dr. K.G. Jagadeesha, IAS
- Parent organization: Ministry of Commerce and Industry
- Website: www.coffeeboard.gov.in

The Coffee Board of India (CBoI) is an autonomous organisation managed by the Ministry of Commerce and Industry, Government of India to promote coffee production in India. The head office of the Coffee Board is situated in Bangalore.

== History ==
The Coffee Board of India was established by an act of Parliament in 1942. Until 1995 the CBoI marketed the coffee of a pooled supply. Later, coffee marketing became a private-sector activity due to the economic liberalisation in India. In 2020s, India was the world's seventh-largest coffee producer.

The Coffee Board's traditional duties included

- promotion of sale, and consumption of coffee in India and abroad
- conducting coffee research
- financial assistance to establish small coffee growers
- safeguarding working conditions for laborers
- managing the surplus pool of unsold coffee.

== See also ==
- Cooperative movement in India
  - Amul, India's largest milk and dairy brand cooperative societies network
  - Coconut Development Board
  - Coir Board of India
  - Spices Board of India
  - Tea Board of India
