= Devarshola =

Devarshola Devarsolai
- Town Panchayat
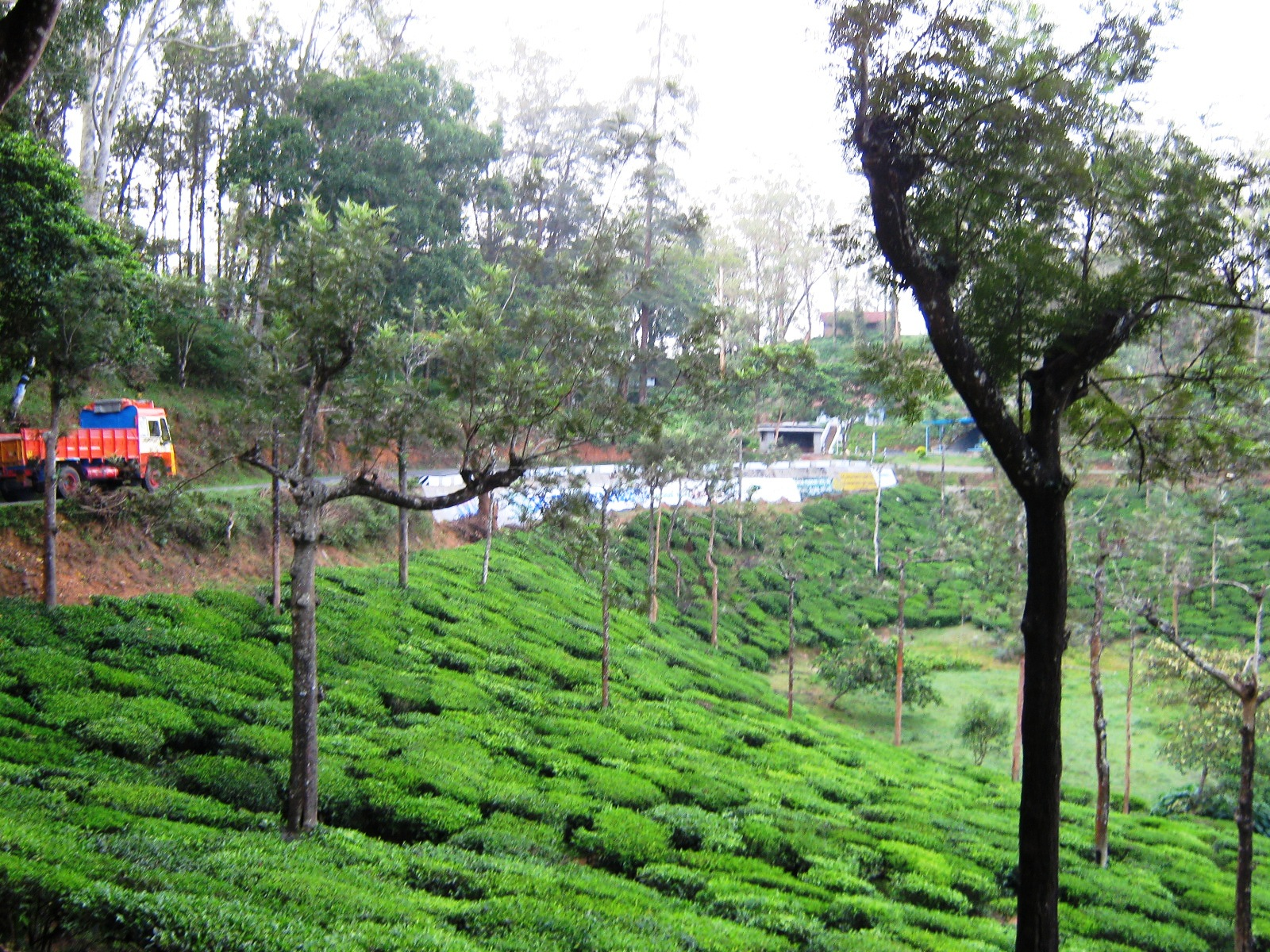

- Location in Tamil Nadu, India
- Coordinates: 11°32′0″N 76°27′12″E
- Country: India
- State: Tamil Nadu
- District: The Nilgiris

Area
  - Total: 35 km^{2} (14 sq mi)

Population (2011)
  - Total: 24,954
  - Density: 710/km^{2} (1,800/sq mi)

Languages
  - Official: Tamil
- Time zone: UTC+5:30 (IST)
- Postal code: 643207
- Vehicle registration: TN 43

Devarshola or Devarsolai, is a town panchayat in Gudalur taluk, Nilgiris district in the Indian state of Tamil Nadu. It is located about 62 km (39 mi) from Ooty. Spread across an area of 35 km^{2} (14 sq mi), the town panchayat is divided into 18 wards. It had a population of 24,954 as per the 2011 census.

== Geography ==
Devarshola is a town panchayat in Coonoor taluk of Nilgiris district in the Indian state of Tamil Nadu. It is located approximately 62 km (39 mi) from Ooty and 4 km (2.5 mi) from Gudalur. The town panchayat covers an area of 35 km^{2} (14 sq mi) and consists of 18 wards and 102 streets.

== Administration and politics ==
Devarshola town panchayat was established on 30 April 1934 and was upgraded as a selection grade (annual revenue between 10 to 20 million) town panchayat on 13 April 1985. The panchayat administration is responsible for providing basic services including maintenance of roads, water supply, health and sanitation. Devarshola forms part of the Gudalur Assembly constituency that elects its member to the Tamil Nadu legislative assembly and the Nilgiris Lok Sabha constituency that elects its member to the Parliament of India.

== Demographics ==
According to the 2011 census, Devarshola had a population of 24,954 across 5,594 households. The population consisted of 12,342 males and 12,612 females. About 2,970 (11.9%) of the population were children aged less than six years. The town panchayat had a literacy rate of approximately 84%, with male literacy at 88.7% and female literacy at 79.6. Scheduled Castes accounted for approximately 18% of the population, while Scheduled Tribes accounted for 10.82%.

== Culture and religion ==
According to the 2011 census, Hinduism was the predominant religion, practiced by 56.6% of the population, followed by Islam (36.4%) and Christianity (6.8%). There are two Hindu temples in the town panchayat, dedicated to Shiva and Vettaikaran. Maha Shivaratri is the major festival celebrated annually at the Shiva temple.

== Economy ==
Plantation farming is the major occupation in the town panchayat. It is known for its tea cultivation. Others include coffee, and spices including cardamom, clove, and pepper. Due to its plantation cover, wild animals such as tiger, leopard, and elephant often venture into the town panchayat leading to human-wildlife conflict and deaths of wildlife, humans, and cattle.

The working population constituted approximately 40.8% of the total population, comprising 10,185 workers, of whom 6,639 were males and 3,546 were females. Of the total working population, 88.1% were engaged in main work, while 11.9% were engaged in marginal work.

== Infrastructure and services ==
Buses connect Devarshola with Gudalur. The nearest railway station is Udagamandalam railway station located approximately 62 km (39 mi) away and the nearest airport is the Coimbatore International Airport. There is a hospital, and government run primary and high schools in the town panchayat.
