= Nilgiri Planters' Association =

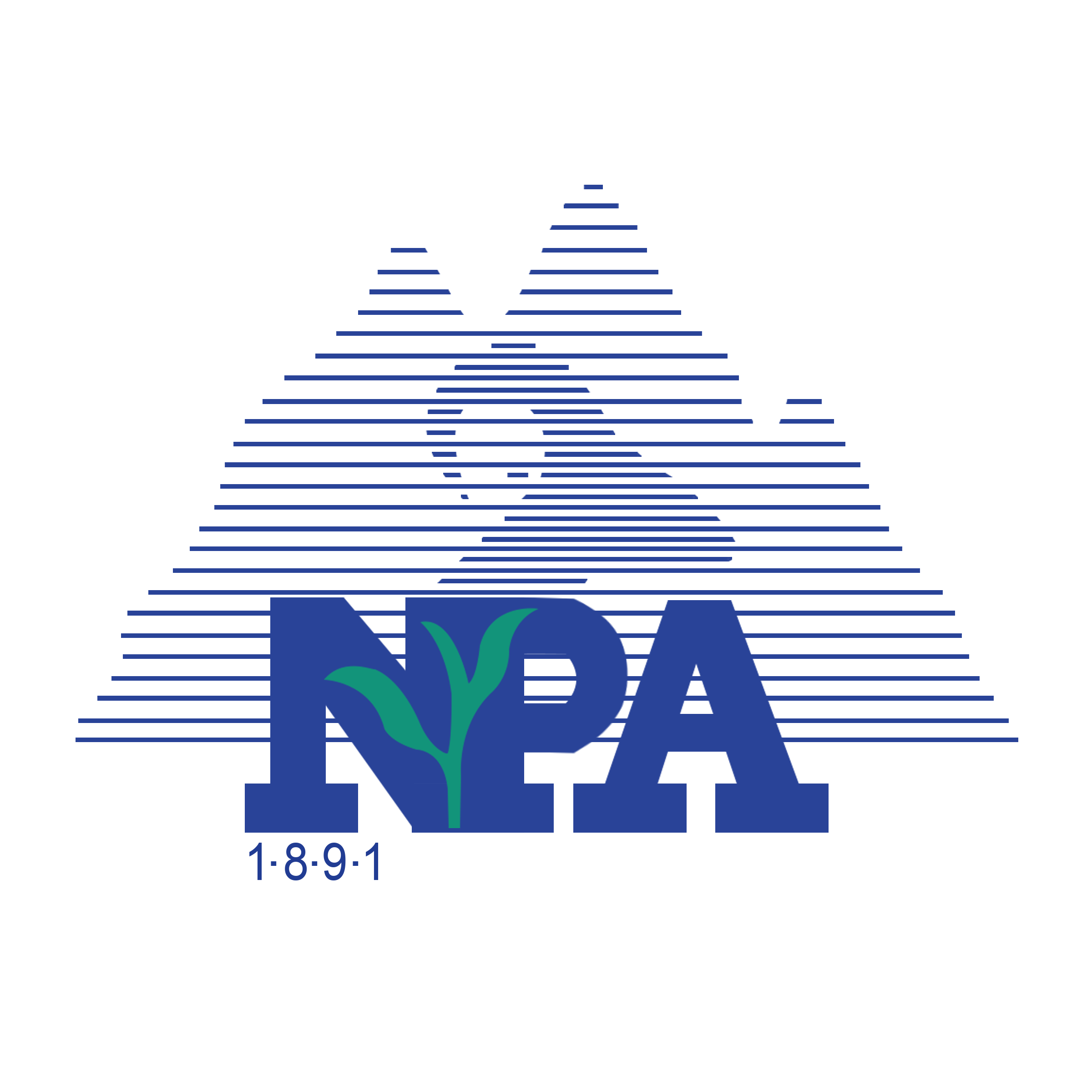
- Abbreviation: NPA
- Formation: 1891; 135 years ago
- Founded at: The Nilgiris
- Type: Trade association
- Location: Coonoor, Nilgiris district, Tamil Nadu, India
- Affiliations: United Planters' Association of Southern India

Nilgiri Planters' Association (NPA) is a Trade association representing tea and coffee growers in the Nilgiris district of Tamil Nadu, India. Headquartered in Coonoor, it is one of the constituent district associations affiliated to the United Planters' Association of Southern India (UPASI), the apex body for plantation crops in South India.

== History ==
European coffee and tea planters in the Nilgiris founded the Nilgiri Planters' Association in 1891, as the district's tea industry developed following early commercial plantings at Thiashola (1859) and elsewhere. The association affiliated with UPASI, the newly formed apex planting body for the Madras Presidency and southern princely states, in 1894, to represent estate interests in matters of land and finance.

During the 1970s and 1980s, Nilgiri tea production expanded considerably, driven in part by the resettlement of repatriated Indian-origin Tamils from Sri Lanka under the Sirima-Shastri Pact and a state-backed crop diversification programme. As Soviet demand for Nilgiri tea declined in the late 1980s, the association is credited with leading efforts among estates and smallholders to shift production toward orthodox and white teas, promote single-estate marketing, and adopt quality certification aimed at Western markets.

== Structure and role ==
The NPA represents the larger corporate and estate-sector tea producers as well as the small tea growers of the Nilgiris. Estates affiliated with the NPA have been estimated to account for roughly a third of tea production in the district.

== See also ==
- United Planters' Association of Southern India
- Nilgiri tea
- UPASI Tea Research Foundation
