= Spices Board of India =

Regulatory body for spices in India

- Logo of the organisation
- Formation: 1987
- Type: Indian Government regulatory and export promotion agency
- Headquarters: Kochi, Kerala, India
- Chairman: Amardeep Singh Bhatia, IAS
- Secretary: Dr. K. G. Jagadeesha, IAS
- Parent organisation: Government of India
- Website: indianspices.com

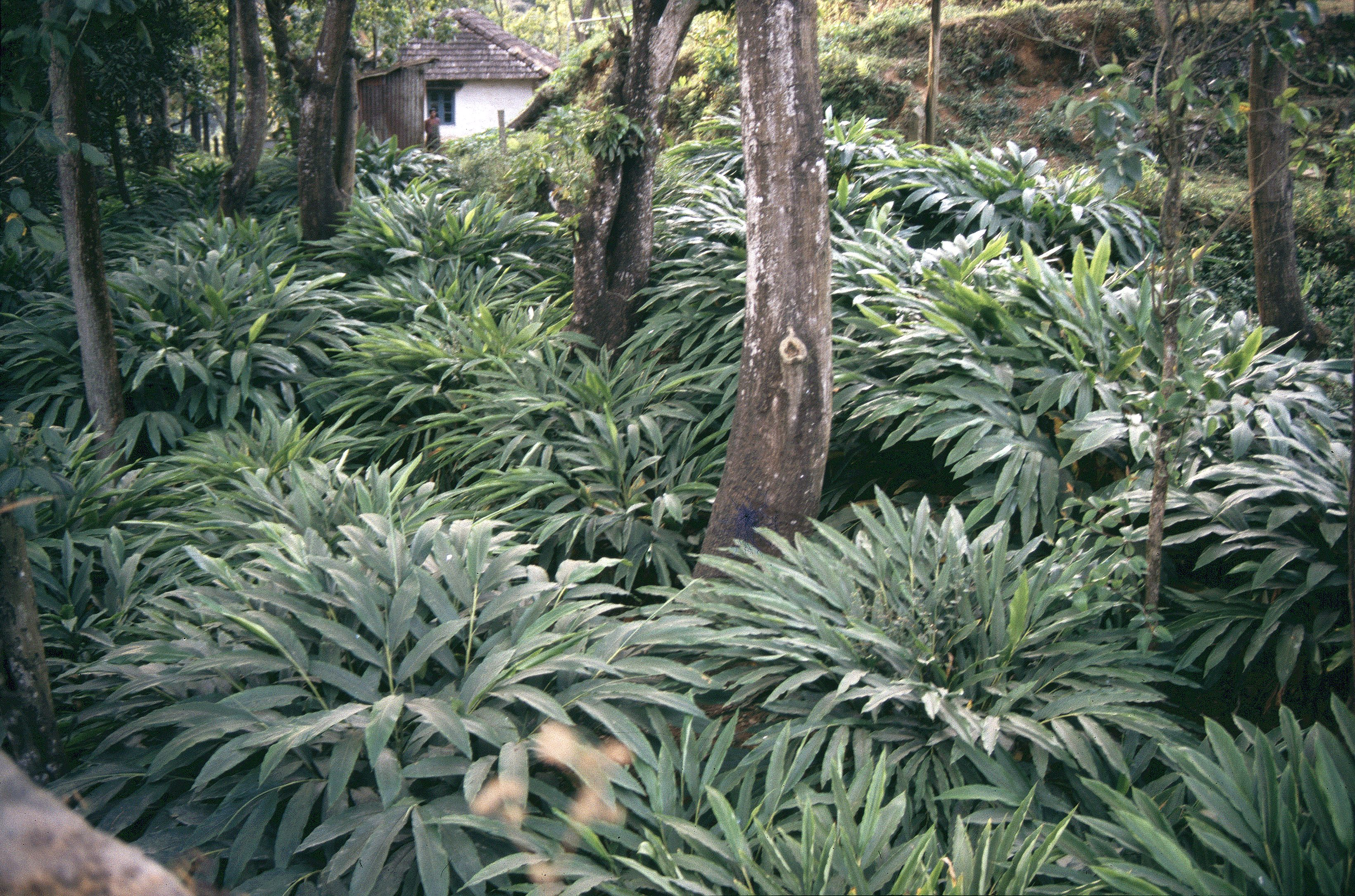
Cardamom plants at Cardamom Hills, Kerala

The Spices Board is the Indian government regulatory and export promotion agency for Indian spices headed by a Chairman, a rank equivalent to Joint Secretary to the Government of India. The board is headquartered in Kochi.

== History ==
Spices Board was constituted in 1987 under Spices Board Act 1986 with the responsibility of production/development of Cardamom and export promotion of 52 spices shown in the schedule of the Act.

== Administration ==
The Spices Board has an outlet next to its headquarters in Kochi. Spices are sold under the brand 'Flavourit'.

== Services ==
=== Quality lab ===
The board has a state-of-the-art testing laboratory at its headquarters in Kochi. There are also regional laboratories at Mumbai, Chennai, Delhi, Tuticorin, Kandla and Guntur. Through the laboratories, the Spices Board makes mandatory quality checks for spices exported from India.

=== Infor services for buyers ===
Spices Board provides information on several spices grown and exported from India The Spice Park of Spices Board India for cardamom and pepper is situated at Puttady.

=== Customer info campaigns ===
The Spices Board of India has started an online campaign, called the Spice Train, to educate Indians about the country's rich spice heritage

== See also ==
- Tea Board of India
- Coconut Development Board
- Coir Board of India
- Cooperative movement in India
- Amul, India's largest milk and dairy brand cooperative societies network
