= Tea Board of India =

Government agency in India

- Formation: 1 April 1954; 72 years ago
- Type: Indian Government Organisation
- Headquarters: Kolkata, West Bengal, India
- Location(s): London, United Kingdom; Moscow, Russia; Dubai, United Arab Emirates
- Chairman: Shri Nitin Kumar Yadav, IAS (HY: 2000)
- Parent organisation: Ministry of Commerce and Industry, Government of India
- Website: teaboard.gov.in

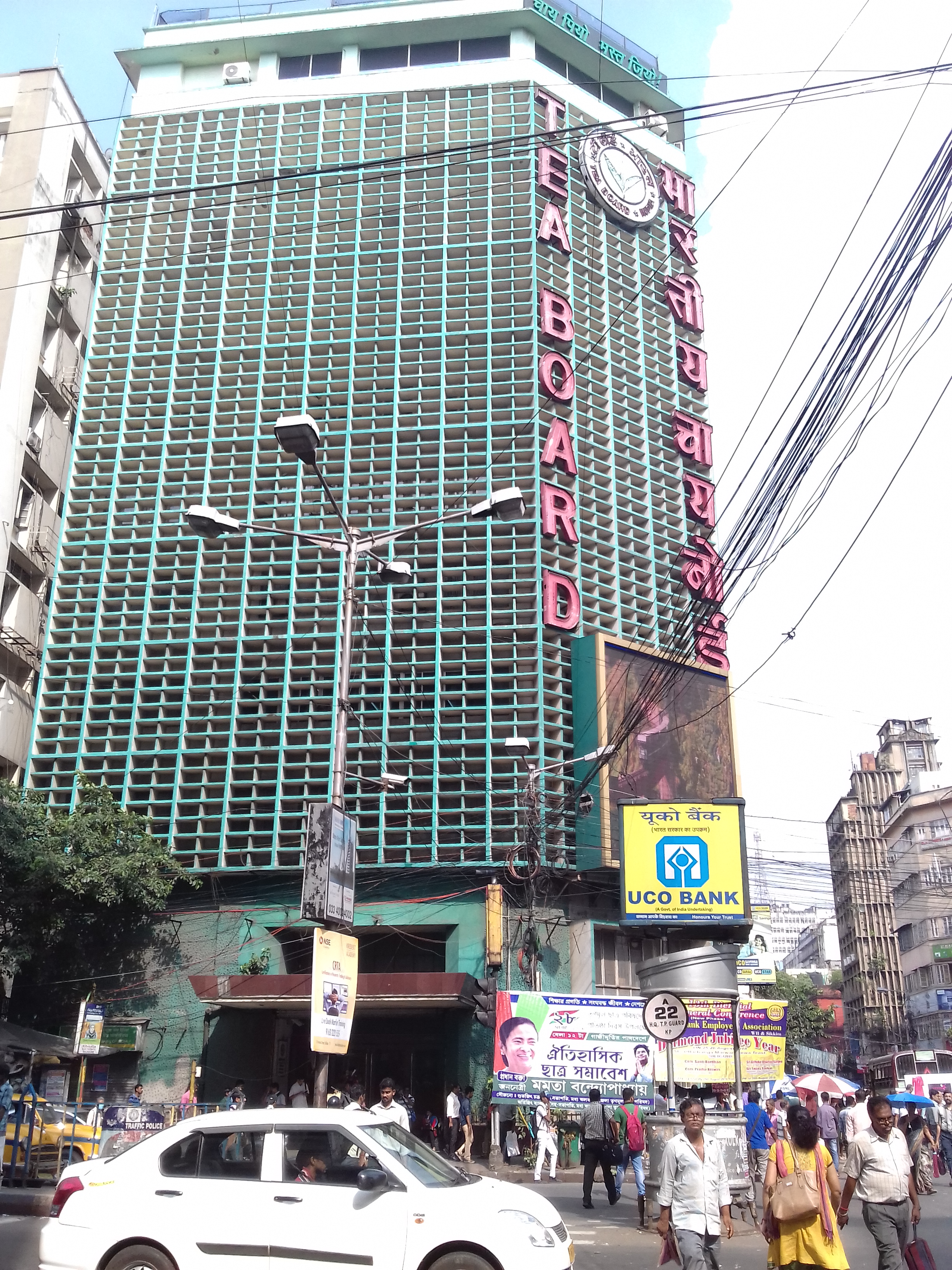
Tea Board of India's Head Office at B.B.D. Bagh, Kolkata

The Tea Board of India is a state agency of the Government of India under the control of the Ministry of Commerce and Industry, established to promote the cultivation, processing, and domestic trade as well as export of tea from India. It was established by the enactment of the Tea Act in 1953 with its headquarters in Kolkata (formerly Calcutta).

== Functions ==
The Tea Board India is responsible for the assignment of certification numbers to exports of certain tea merchants. This certification is intended to ensure the teas’ origin, which in turn would reduce the amount of fraudulent labelling on rare teas such as ones harvested in Darjeeling. The excessive amounts of 'faux' Darjeeling tea sold on the global market relates in stark opposition to the fraction of exporters which are licensed by the Tea Board India as legitimate traders of this region.

The Tea Board India's tasks include endorsement of the diverse production and productivity of tea, financial support of research organisations and the monitoring of advances in tea packaging as it relates to health beneficial aspects.

It coordinates research institutes, the tea trade and government bodies, ensuring the technical support of the tea trade in the global industry.

The Small Tea Growers' Development Directorate is an office of the Tea Board India Contact Directory located at Amolapatty, Dibrugarh, Assam.

== Global offices ==
The headquarter of the board is located in Kolkata of West Bengal. Currently Tea Board has only one office located at Moscow. This foreign office of the Board is designed to undertake the various promotional measures to boost up export of Indian tea. This office also acts as a liaison office for interaction between importers of Indian tea of the respective region as well as Indian Exporters.

== See also ==
- Tea
  - Assam tea
  - Darjeeling tea
  - Indian Tea Association
  - Kangra tea
  - Tocklai Tea Research Institute
- Cooperative movement in India
  - Amul, India's largest milk and dairy brand cooperative societies network
  - Coffee Board of India
  - Coconut Development Board
  - Coir Board of India
  - Spices Board of India

== Sources ==
- Tea Board India
- Sarin, Rekha; Kapoor, Rajan (2014). Chai: The Experience of Indian Tea. Niyogi Books, India. ISBN 9789381523919.
