= RAF Coolham =

Second World War British RAF Advanced Landing Ground

RAF Coolham
- Coolham, West Sussex, in England
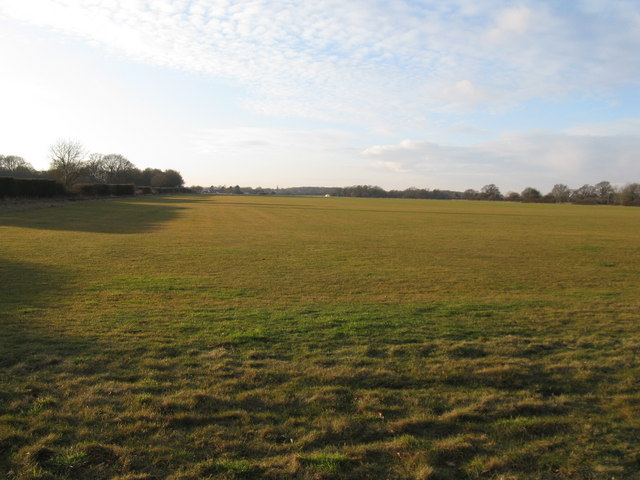
- View from near the eastern edge of the main east-west runway looking westward down its length, former RAF Coolham, 2009

Site information
- Type: Advanced Landing Ground
- Code: XQ
- Owner: Air Ministry
- Operator: Royal Air Force
- Controlled by: RAF Second Tactical Air Force; No. 84 Group RAF
- Open to the public: Yes

Location
- Shown within West Sussex RAF Coolham (the United Kingdom)
- Coordinates: 50°59′20″N 0°24′05″W
- Grid reference: TQ123223
- Area: 113 acres (46 ha) (Note: The area requisitioned for RAF Coolham was 113 acres in total, which is 45.7295 hectares (113 divided by 2.471), 457,295m² (113 multiplied by 4,047), or 0.457295km² (113 multiplied by 247.1).)

Site history
- Built: August 1943 – Beginning of March 1944
- Built by: Airfield Construction Service RAF
- In use: 1 April 1944 – 4 July 1944
- Battles/wars: Second World War; Western Front; Operation Ramrod; Operation Neptune; Operation Overlord; Operation Diver

Garrison information
- Garrison: 2 Wings of No. 84 Group RAF (See Based Units section for full list)
- Occupants: No. 133 (Polish) (Fighter) Wing; No. 129 (Mysore) (Fighter) Squadron; No. 306 (Polish) (Fighter) Squadron; No. 315 (Polish) (Fighter) Squadron; No. 135 (Fighter) Wing; No. 222 (Natal) (Fighter) Squadron; No. 349 (Belgian) (Fighter) Squadron; No. 485 (New Zealand) (Fighter) Squadron

Airfield information
- Elevation: 17 metres (56 ft) AMSL
Runways
Direction	Length and surface
12/30	4,500 feet (1,372 m) Grass-seeded Sommerfeld tracking
05/23	3,600 feet (1,097 m) Grass-seeded Sommerfeld tracking

Royal Air Force Coolham, or RAF Coolham, also known as Coolham Advanced Landing Ground (ALG), is a former British Second World War Royal Air Force Advanced Landing Ground, a type of temporary advance airfield. The airfield is located in Coolham, England. The site was surveyed for suitability by the Air Ministry between June and July 1942 and in October 1942 it was agreed that an ALG (Advanced Landing Ground) would be constructed there, to be one of seven constructed in Sussex during the war.

The site was requisitioned by the Air Ministry soon after the agreement, and construction began in August 1943 with the work being carried out by the RAF Airfield Construction Branch, supplemented by various local landscaping, construction, and maintenance contractors. Two runways were constructed of Sommerfield tracking, then seeded with grass. The main east–west runway stretched 4,500 feet (1,372 m) and the second, shorter, north–south runway was 3,600 feet (1,097 m) long. Supporting infrastructure, installations, and defence posts for the ALG were also erected.

On 15 February 1944, while Sommerfield tracking was still being laid, an American B-26 Marauder that had earlier been hit by flak and damaged while on a bombing mission over France made an emergency crash landing on the main east–west runway, which was still under construction at the time. Inadvertently, it become the first plane to land at RAF Coolham, even though the ALG was not operational by this point. RAF Coolham lost its first serviceman when a soldier from the RAF Airfield Construction Branch was killed, while the main runway suffered damage. All the crew of the B-26 Marauder survived, but construction was elongated because of the landing.

Construction of RAF Coolham was finally complete to an operational standard by the beginning of March 1944, and the airfield was operational from 1 April 1944 until 4 July 1944.

== Background ==
During June and July 1942, Southern England was searched by Air Ministry surveyors attempting to identify suitable sites for the construction of Advanced Landing Grounds (ALGs). The main purpose of the Southern England ALGs was, owing to their close proximity to Nazi-occupied Europe, to provide air support to allied forces prior to, during, and after an anticipated future liberation of the European mainland, which later manifested on 6 June 1944 as the Normandy Landings (Operation Neptune, AKA D-Day) and the Battle of Normandy (Operation Overlord). In total, 72 such sites were located, although this figure was considerably whittled down to just 23 sites which were eventually used to construct ALGs upon, this being mainly due to the war agricultural executive committees' fierce opposition to such large swathes of agricultural land being requisitioned and thus no longer being agriculturally productive. One of these sites was located on land near the small village of Coolham, West Sussex, England. A top-level Air Ministry conference was held at Coolham on 8 October 1942 when it was at last agreed that an ALG would indeed be constructed on the previously identified site at Coolham.

The site consisted of land accessed by, and to the east of, the B2139 Thakeham Road, and just south east of Coolham crossroad, with Saucelands Lane itself adjoining the southern perimeter. This ALG, which would be known as Royal Air Force Coolham, or more simply, RAF Coolham, was situated roughly 6 miles (9.7 km) southwest of Horsham and would be one of seven ALGs eventually constructed in Sussex for use by RAF Fighter Command, along with its allies. The other 6 Sussex ALGs constructed were RAF Appledram, RAF Bognor, RAF Chailey, RAF Deanland, RAF Funtington, and RAF Selsey. On account of the Coolham site's level terrain and the area's excellent transport infrastructure connections via road and rail, specifically Billingshurst, Christ's Hospital, Southwater, and Horsham, it was considered to be an ideal location.

== Construction ==
=== Preparation ===
In total, 113 acres (46 ha) of both wooded and agricultural land was requisitioned by the Air Ministry at Coolham. Original estimates were that 700–800 hedgerow trees would need to be cleared, and approximately 8,400 feet (2,600 m) of high-tension electrical cable would need to be laid and buried, along with wiring for telex and PBX telephone facilities. The area's natural flatness, although partly why it was chosen as an ALG site, also meant that, in conjunction with the heavy topsoil of Weald Clay present in the area, under-drainage would be required to prevent the strip area becoming boggy after rainfall, and this initially made planners believe preparation of the site would be slow.

The seven-month-long construction of the airfield commenced during August 1943 with 156 personnel of Nos. 4661 and 4663 AC Flight, of 5004 Airfield Construction Squadron, Airfield Construction Service RAF, commanded by Squadron Leader J. K. Lancaster. 5004 Squadron utilised a large amount of plant to carry out construction, including (but not limited to) bulldozers, tractors, dump trucks, road rollers, a paint sprayer, and a concrete mixer. (Note: 5004 Airfield Construction Squadron records state the following plant was used at RAF Coolham in construction: 2 David Brown Tractors, 3 Dumpers, 1 DH10 Bulldozer, 1 D8 Bulldozer, 2 D4 Bulldozers, 1 Water Trailer, 1 Concrete Mixer, 1 Portable Saw, 1 Petrol Bowser, 1 scraper 12 yard, 1 Blade Grader, 1 Roller 8 ton, 1 Roller 2.5 ton, 1 D4 Tractor, 1 Disc Harrow, 1 Tractor Harrow, 1 Gang Roller, 1 Agricultural Trailer, and 1 Paint Sprayer.) A number of airmen constructing the ALG at Coolham were billeted at the prisoner-of-war camp at Barn House Farm, Shipley, (POW Camp 658) at the southern end of the airfield, while others were billeted in numerous farm buildings along Saucelands Lane. As a temporary measure, those who happened to live nearby could apply for a 'living out' pass and cycle/commute to and from RAF Coolham. H. Kay, a local Horsham contractors, were also employed in the initial ground clearance and levelling, and Ronald Coleman, a civil engineer who had been seconded to the War Office, worked with both civilians and RAF personnel in constructing RAF Coolham from the very beginning.

The north–south runway's southern end was initially obstructed by buildings. Five Mile Ash, situated on the south side of Saucelands Lane, was demolished as it directly obstructed the southern end of the north–south runway. An adjacent historic property, Saucelands, was saved from destruction after the West Sussex County Council objected to its demolition. Bridge Hill House, situated on B2139 Thakeham Road at the western end of the main east–west runway, had its roof removed due to safety concerns about its height possibly hindering clearance at the end of the runway, making it uninhabitable until the roof was restored after the end of the war.

=== Runways ===
Two runways were constructed in total: the larger main runway running east–west (12/30) for 4,500 feet (1,372 m), and the smaller second runway running north–south (05/23) for 3,600 feet (1,097 m), with both runways constructed using Sommerfeld tracking. Sommerfeld tracking was a relatively light weight, inexpensive, quick, and easily assemblable method of reinforcing a ground bearing surface for use by heavy vehicles and high volumes of traffic, preventing the bearing surface from wearing away, and preventing vehicles from sinking and becoming bogged down or stuck. For those reasons, Sommerfeld tracking was ideal for constructing ALGs' runways which were only intended to be used temporarily, had to be built quickly, and would see heavy aeroplanes taking off and landing regularly. It consisted of rolls, 23 metres (75 ft) long and 3.25 metres (11 ft) wide, of metal wire mesh, similar to chicken wire or chainlink fencing, with round iron bars at regular intervals all along its length running widthways and looped at either end. It was rolled out flat on the ground like a mat, and flat iron bars were then threaded through the loops to physically anchor each track together, before it was all anchored to the ground using 2 ft and 3 ft iron pickets.

At RAF Coolham, 5004 Airfield Construction Squadron laid most of the Sommerfeld tracking down. A mobile crane was used to move the rolls into place as the weight of each roll, (Note: An assembled 300 feet (91 m) Sommerfeld track weighed approximately 2.5 tons.) although lighter than other alternatives, meant that it would otherwise take 6 personnel to move each roll into position. One row of tracking was laid along the entire length of each of Coolham's runways and secured by a group of 3 personnel with sledgehammers driving the 2 ft and 3 ft iron pickets into the ground one at a time, swinging in harmony on the same picket. Once this initial length of tracking was laid, other rolls of tracking were laid next to, and adjoined with, the side of the initial length, until the required width of the runway was completed. A tractor was used to stretch the width of the tracking taut so it could be secured in place with further pickets until the whole length was taut. Although the Sommerfeld tracking patent states that asphalt or a similar material should then be added onto the mesh to cover it, at Coolham this was not the case due to the temporary nature of advanced landing grounds. Instead, grass seed was sown over the tracking; the grass' roots would help to consolidate the soil together and to aid in the drainage of rainwater.

In order to prevent traffic from crossing the north–south runway, which could otherwise cause a collision with aircraft during take offs and landings, traffic barriers were erected on Saucelands Lane, which crossed the north–south runway's southern end. The barriers were to be brought down to close the lane off to the public when the runway was in use. The control tower at RAF Coolham was a moveable caravan and the ALG was designated by the airfield identification letters XQ. There was no instrument landing system to aid aircraft in landing at night or during bad weather, and sorties were monitored by the personnel of ROC Group No. 2, Royal Observer Corps, based nearby at Denne Road, Horsham.

=== Installations ===
36 aircraft dispersal hardstandings were constructed. The hardstandings were intended to space aircraft apart from each other when not in use, in order to mitigate aircraft losses if the airfield suffered enemy bombing, sabotage, or accidents. Five blister hangars were also erected along with an armoury, pyrotechnic dumps, a defence post, a technical and communal site, two refuelling points, a bulk oil compound, eight marshalling areas (two situated opposite of each other at each of the four ends of the two runways), two refuelling points (both situated opposite each other outside of the perimeter track at the eastern end of the main east–west runway), five small arms ammunition stores (dispersed across the empty space of the requisitioned area), and a 24,000 gallon capacity petrol installation. Marquees and tents were used for squadron offices, the canteen, motor transport buildings, and stores. Virtually all accommodation for operational airmen was tented, and medical facilities were also tented but included a mobile surgery. Conditions in the tented accommodation were cold, wet, and sometimes cramped, and a number of NCO airmen resorted to sleeping on wooden boxes. Toilet and bathing facilities were present but extremely basic. Part of Farleys Farm, which was situated to the east of Thakeham Road and within the requisitioned site for the airfield, was used as an administration centre and nursing ward.

Although transport links from elsewhere to nearby areas was good, the majority of the airmen at RAF Coolham did not possess motorised transport of their own, and during their brief off-duty periods they would visit the Selsey Arms pub at the nearby Coolham Crossroads, or cycle to nearby villages.

=== Crash landing of 'Flounder Gus' ===
In February 1944, the runways at RAF Coolham were still under construction with the laying of Sommerfield tracking actively ongoing. On 15 February, the American B-26 Marauder No. 41-34913 'Flounder Gus', of the 323rd Bombardment Group, 454th Bomb Squadron, 2nd Air Division, Ninth Air Force, USAAF, had taken off at 8:45AM from its base in RAF Earls Colne, Essex, on a bombing mission to destroy a V-1 flying bomb launch site on the Cherbourg Peninsula of Normandy, France. 12 planes had set off on this mission, which consisted of 2 flights. Flounder Gus was the lead aircraft of the 2nd flight, but upon bombing their target and turning to leave the Cherbourg Peninsula, the lead aircraft of the 1st flight was hit by accurate German anti-aircraft fire, so Flounder Gus assumed the role of lead aircraft for the first flight. Upon pulling into position, Flounder Gus was subsequently peppered by German anti-aircraft fire, knocking out her right engine and causing her left engine to spew oil.

The Captain, 1st Lieutenant Richard H. Lightfine, asked his engineer-gunner, Staff Sergeant Fay C. Kruger, what they should do in light of the damage. Kruger replied "Get home as quickly as we can, 'cos I doubt we'll get there unless we start right now and the first field you see, land.". Flounder Gus limped back towards England, but due to the loss of one engine, lagged behind the rest of the flight and had to drop from 12,000 ft to 5,000 ft to maintain airspeed. The radio being made inoperable by the anti-aircraft fire, the crew could not locate RAF Manston or one of the other larger airfields on which they could attempt a landing, and knew that even if they could, they likely wouldn't make it in time. The crew threw out flak vests, ammunition, guns, and anything of weight they could no longer use, fearing they would have to ditch the plane into the English Channel, whilst the left engine was running at full throttle to maintain minimum altitude and necessary airspeed. As Flounder Gus approached the English coast, Lightfine stated "Boys, you have a choice, you can bale out over water, you can bale out over land, or we can take it in" to which the bombardier-navigator Arthur Hanni replied "I've bailed out once, landed on the slate roof of an English mansion, bounced off that into oak trees and got beat up and under no circumstances am I going to bale out, we'll ride it in". With that, the crew of Flounder Gus committed to attempting to land the aircraft on the first appropriate field or airstrip they could locate by sight.

Visibility was initially poor, but by pure chance, Hanni spotted what looked like a small grassy landing strip in a field which was the then-incomplete RAF Coolham. Hanni pointed it out to the pilot who began to descend for a landing. With the right engine knocked out and the left engine still spewing oil, they began to circle the airfield to line up with the runway and could see personnel on the ground watching them, who assumed Flounder Gus was conducting a dummy run. The crew were oblivious to the fact that the airfield was still under construction and that they would soon be the first plane to land at RAF Coolham. Flounder Gus then came in to land from the east on the main 1500m east–west runway, but at an altitude of just 100 ft, right before the aircraft touched down on the incomplete runway, the left engine finally failed and shut off. With the trim controls engaging and the right propeller wind-milling, Lightfine could no longer control the plane as it started to yaw sharply to the left. Upon seeing this the construction personnel on the ground began to scatter as Flounder Gus endeavoured to avoid hitting them.

The crew tried to straighten out the plane's approach and Hanni pulled up the landing gear for a belly landing to slow their speed before Flounder Gus touched down. Heading directly towards a large oak tree, Flounder Gus collided with it, sheering off its left wing but considerably slowing its speed in the process and inadvertently saving many lives, skidding along the newly laid runway and causing considerable damage by ripping up some 100 ft of Sommerfield tracking. Sergeant Charles Gordon of 5018 Airfield Construction Squadron, who was overseeing a Sommerfield track laying party, was hit in the head by the propeller of the left wing, which had broken off upon hitting the oak tree and was killed instantly. An eyewitness said that had he laid flat like the rest of the construction personnel the propeller would have missed him. Flounder Gus was completely destroyed and had broken in two, with the tail section of the aircraft, still with rear gunner Staff Sergeant Lloyd A. Raymond inside, soaring over Thakeham Road and a hedgerow at the end of the field, and landing in the farmyard of Bridge Hill Farm. The other part of the fuselage came to a stop at the end of the field underneath telephone wires just across Thakeham Road, which was also near Bridge Hill Farm.

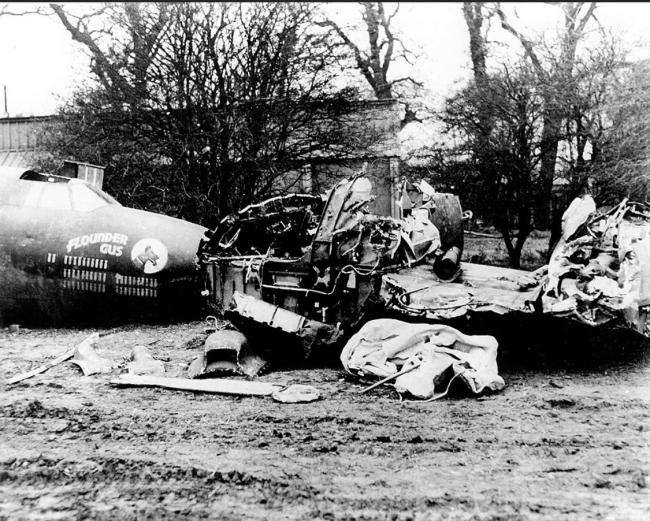
Wreckage of the B-26 Marauder 'Flounder Gus', RAF Coolham, 15 February 1944

Raymond managed to escape the incident badly bruised with minor cuts but alive. A lady walked out of the cottage and upon seeing the fuselage and Raymond laying on the ground she asked "Would you like a cup of tea?" to which Raymond replied "Yes, I will have a cup of tea." He then proceeded to have a cup of tea and talk with the lady for roughly 15 minutes, clearly in a state of shock after the event. Meanwhile, the radio operator-gunner Staff Sergeant Rue Farnum had received a broken nose and was knocked unconscious in the crash, and he had to be picked up and rescued from the wreckage by Hanni and Kruger and they, along with Lightfine, began looking for Raymond, who eventually appeared, having walked back to meet them. The whole crew of Flounder Gus were taken as a precaution by the Canadian forces in the area via ambulance to the Canadian Base Hospital in Roffey, Horsham, where Raymond and Farnum were detained for 24 hour observation, with the others being released and taken to RAF Dunsfold shortly after where they were flown back to their base at RAF Earls Colne.

Construction of the airfield to an operational standard was completed not long after by the beginning of March 1944. On 26 March 1944, No. 8 Section, 422 Aviation Fuel and Ammunition Park, RAF Maintenance Command, transferred to RAF Coolham and began setting up bomb dumps, pyrotechnic dumps, ammunition dumps, and fuel supplies, along with oxygen equipment for use by aircrew.

== Operational history ==
RAF Coolham was operational from 1 April 1944 until 4 July 1944. The first fighter squadrons arrived on 1 April 1944 when No. 133 (Polish) Airfield Headquarters, No. 84 Group, 2nd Tactical Airforce, RAF, transferred to RAF Coolham from RAF Heston and consisted of No. 306 (Polish) (Fighter) Squadron and No. 315 (Polish) (Fighter) Squadron. Other units that transferred to Coolham that day included No. 5090c (Polish) Mobile Signals Unit consisting of 20 personnel, and No. 411 (Polish) Repair and Salvage Unit, tasked with the repair, servicing, and salvage of aircraft, assisted by personnel of No. 49 Maintenance Unit, RAF Faygate. No. 2722 (Light Anti-Aircraft) Squadron, RAF Regiment, also transferred to Coolham that day and gun site defences consisting of four 40mm Bofors, eight 20mm Hispano cannons, and twelve twin .303 Browning machine guns were made operational.

== Stationed and supporting units ==
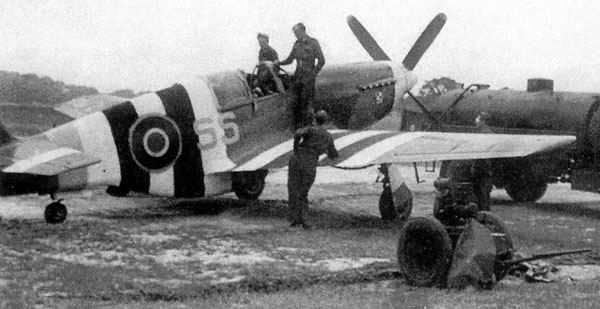
Mustang Mk III flown by fighter ace and Wing Commander Stanisław Skalski of No. 133 (Polish) (Fighter) Wing RAF painted with invasion stripes, RAF Coolham, June 1944

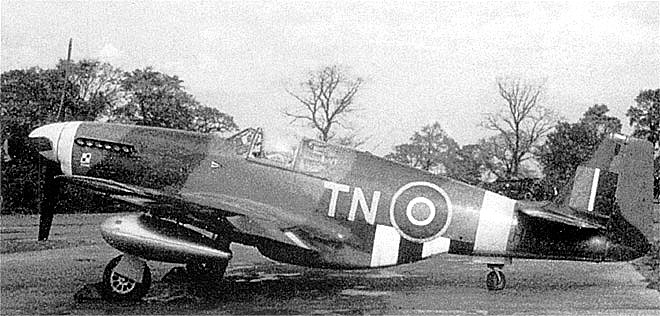
Mustang Mk III flown by fighter ace and Wing Commander Tadeusz Nowierski of No. 133 (Polish) (Fighter) Wing RAF, RAF Coolham, July 1944

It is believed that c. 700 personnel served at RAF Coolham at some point, 15 of whom were killed whilst carrying out their duties at or from RAF Coolham (denotated below with a cross '†').

The following order of battle shows all units which are known to have been stationed at, or nearby in support of, RAF Coolham, at any point during its construction and its operational history (August 1943 – July 1944), as well as later deconstruction work as the aerodrome was reverted to agricultural land (September 1945 – October 1945):

=== Royal Air Force ===
==== Second Tactical Air Force ====
- No. 84 Group
  - No. 18 (Fighter) Sector
    - No. 133 (Polish) (Fighter) Wing (Transferred as No. 133 (Polish) Airfield Headquarters)
      - No. 129 (Mysore) (Fighter) Squadron †††††
        - No. 6129 Servicing Echelon
      - No. 306 (Polish) (Fighter) Squadron ††††
        - No. 6306 Servicing Echelon
      - No. 315 (Polish) (Fighter) Squadron ††††
        - No. 6315 Servicing Echelon
    - No. 135 (Fighter) Wing
      - No. 222 (Natal) (Fighter) Squadron
        - No. 6222 Servicing Echelon
      - No. 349 (Belgian) (Fighter) Squadron
        - No. 6349 Servicing Echelon
      - No. 485 (New Zealand) (Fighter) Squadron
        - No. 6485 Servicing Echelon
  - No. 84 Group Signals
    - No. 5090c (Polish) Mobile Signal Unit
    - No. 16 Advanced Landing Ground Signal Section
  - No. 411 (Polish) Repair and Salvage Unit †

==== Royal Air Force Regiment ====
- No. 1314 Mobile Wing RAF Regiment
- No. 2701 (Light Anti-Aircraft) Squadron RAF Regiment
- No. 2722 (Light Anti-Aircraft) Squadron RAF Regiment
- No. 2800 (Light Anti-Aircraft) Squadron RAF Regiment
- No. 2829 (Field) Squadron RAF Regiment

==== RAF Airfield Construction Branch ====
- No. 5003 Airfield Construction Squadron
- No. 5004 Airfield Construction Squadron
- No. 5018 Airfield Construction Squadron †
- No. 5027 Airfield Construction Squadron
- No. 5206 (Plant) Airfield Construction Squadron

==== RAF Maintenance Command ====
- No. 40 (Maintenance) Group
  - No. 49 (Faygate) Maintenance Unit
- No. 42 (Maintenance) Group
  - No. 422 Aviation Fuel and Ammunition Park
    - No. 8 Section

==== RAF Fighter Command ====
- Royal Observer Corps
  - No. 2 Group ROC
