= Alleppy Coir =

Type of coir prepared by coconut

Alleppy Coir refers to the Coir products made in Ambalappuzha and Cherthala Taluks of Alappuzha district, in the state of Kerala, India. Coir production in this region dates back to as early as 1859. The World Trade Organization (WTO) granted Geographical Indication status to "Alleppey Coir" in 2007.

== Main Products ==
- Coir Bed
- Coir Mat
- Coir Carpet

== History ==
The production of Coir in Alappuzha dates back to centuries. There are mentions of coir in travelogues of Arabs and in Mythology like Ramayana.

The production of coir in Alappuzha was non mechanized and unorganized until the mid 19th century. The first coir factory in India at Alleppey Darragh Smail & Company was established in 1859 by an Irish American entrepreneur James Darragh. Coir was called Cocoa Mats in American English and Darragh Smail & Co. Ltd. had their office and salesrooms at 177, Water Street, New York City. In the following one century many prominent European firms manufactured and exported coir from Alappuzha. The prominent ones were Aspinwall &Co., Pierce Lesley &Co. Ltd., William Goodacre & Sons India Pvt Ltd., Volkart Brothers etc.

In 1940's following the Indian Independence movement and Labour movement in Travancore the European companies exited and decentralization of coir production happened. Presently Coir Board of India is the prime regulatory and promotion body that encourage coir production.

== See also ==
- List of geographical indications in India
- International Coir Museum
