= RAF Funtington =

Former RAF station in West Sussex, England

RAF Funtington
- Funtington, West Sussex in England

Site information
- Type: RAF advanced landing ground
- Code: FJ
- Owner: Air Ministry
- Operator: Royal Air Force
- Controlled by: RAF Second Tactical Air Force * No. 83 Group RAF * No. 84 Group RAF; RAF Fighter Command * No. 11 Group RAF

Location
- Shown within West Sussex RAF Funtington (the United Kingdom)
- Coordinates: 50°51′41″N 000°52′01″W

Site history
- Built: 1943
- In use: September 1943 - 13 December 1944
- Battles/wars: European theatre of World War II

Airfield information
- Elevation: 35 metres (115 ft) AMSL
Runways
Direction	Length and surface
E/W	1,464 metres (4,803 ft) Sommerfeld Tracking
NW/SE	1,097 metres (3,599 ft) Sommerfeld Tracking

Royal Air Force Funtington or more simply RAF Funtington is a former Royal Air Force advanced landing ground located in West Sussex, England.

== History ==
The following units were here at some point:

- No. 122 Airfield Headquarters RAF became No. 122 (Rocket Projectile) Wing with North American Mustang I's
  - No. 19 Squadron RAF (1944)
  - No. 65 (East India) Squadron RAF (1944)
  - No. 122 (Bombay) Squadron RAF (1944)
- No. 130 Airfield Headquarters RAF with Mustang I's
  - No. 4 Squadron RAF (1943)
  - No. 268 Squadron RAF (1943)
- No. 143 (RCAF) Airfield Headquarters RAF with Hawker Typhoon I's
  - No. 438 Squadron RCAF (1944)
  - No. 439 Squadron RCAF (1944)
  - No. 440 Squadron RCAF (1944)
- No. 144 (RCAF) Airfield Headquarters RAF became No. 144 (RCAF) (Fighter) Wing with Supermarine Spitfire IX's
  - No. 441 Squadron RCAF (1944)
  - No. 442 Squadron RCAF (1944)
  - No. 443 Squadron RCAF (1944)
- No. 123 (Rocket Projectile) Wing with Typhoon I's
  - No. 198 Squadron RAF (1944)
  - No. 609 (West Riding) Squadron AAF (1944)
- No. 136 (Fighter) Wing with Typhoon I's
  - No. 164 (Argentine–British) Squadron RAF (1944)
  - No. 183 (Gold Coast) Squadron RAF (1944)
- No. 145 (French) (Fighter) Wing with Spitfire IX's
  - No. 329 (GC I/2 'Cicognes') Squadron RAF (1944)
  - No. 340 (GC IV/2 Île-de-France) Squadron RAF (1944)
  - No. 341 (GC III/2 'Alsace') Squadron RAF (1944)
- No. 135 (Fighter) Wing with Spitfire IX's
  - No. 33 Squadron RAF (1944)
  - No. 222 (Natal) Squadron RAF (1944)
  - No. 349 (Belgian) Squadron RAF (1944)
  - No. 485 Squadron RNZAF (1944)
- No. 132 (Norwegian) (Fighter) Wing with Spitfire IX's
  - No. 66 Squadron RAF (1944)
  - No. 127 Squadron RAF (1944)
  - No. 331 (Norwegian) Squadron RAF (1944)
  - No. 332 (Norwegian) Squadron RAF (1944)

The following units were also here at some point:

- No. 20 (Fighter) Sector
- No. 411 (Polish) Repair & Salvage Unit
- No. 419 (RCAF) Repair & Salvage Unit
- No. 421 Repair & Salvage Unit
- No. 1301 Mobile Wing RAF Regiment
- No. 1309 Mobile Wing RAF Regiment
- No. 2701 Squadron RAF Regiment
- No. 2702 Squadron RAF Regiment
- No. 2739 Squadron RAF Regiment
- No. 2800 Squadron RAF Regiment
- No. 2819 Squadron RAF Regiment
- No. 3208 Servicing Commando

== Current use ==
The site has been reverted to farmland.
