= No. 135 Expeditionary Air Wing =

No.135 Expeditionary Air Wing No. 135 Expeditionary Air Wing (Fighter) RAF No. 135 (Fighter) Wing RAF No. 135 Airfield RAF
- Active: November 1943 - May 1944; May 1944 - December 1947; April 1953 - January 1960; April 2006 - present
- Country: United Kingdom
- Branch: Royal Air Force
- Part of: Part of RAF Air Command
- Home station: RAF Leeming

Aircraft flown
- Fighter: Supermarine Spitfire; Hawker Tempest; Canadair Sabre; Hawker Hunter

No. 135 Expeditionary Air Wing previously No. 135 Wing is a wing of the Royal Air Force. It was stationed at RAF Leeming, controlling the deployable subunits of the base (but not the flying squadrons). It was activated on 1 April 2006 as part of a modernisation package to make the RAF more deployable on an expeditionary basis.

== Second World War ==
No. 135 Airfield RAF

No. 135 Airfield Headquarters was formed at RAF Hornchurch within No. 20 Wing RAF on 15 November 1943 and included No. 66 Squadron RAF, No. 129 Squadron RAF and No. 350 (Belgian) Squadron RAF flying Supermarine Spitfires. The unit moved to RAF Matching Green during February 1944 and joined No. 23 Wing RAF during March 1944, moving to RAF Hornchurch shortly afterwards. The unit moved to RAF Selsey on 11 April 1944 and was transferred to No. 19 Wing RAF, then it was moved to RAF Chailey on 1 May 1944 and was renamed to No. 135 (Fighter) Wing RAF on 12 May 1944.

No. 135 (Fighter) Wing RAF

The wing was formed at RAF Selsey on 12 May 1944 within No. 18 Sector RAF, No. 84 Group RAF, 2nd TAF with 222, 349 (Belgian) and No. 485 Squadron RNZAF Squadrons with the Spitfire IX moving to RAF Coolham on 30 June 1944 then to RAF Funtington on 4 July 1944. The wing moved to Selsey on 6 August, before moving to RAF Tangmere on 19 August and to France on 23 August 1944. The wing was part of No. 18 Fighter Sector of three wings with its headquarters in turn at RAF Chailey nearby. From September 1944 until May 1945, still with 84 Group, moving forward in North West Europe, it included 33, 222, 274 (Typhoon) and 349 (Belgian) Squadrons with Spitfires.

The wing was equipped with Hawker Tempests by the time the Allied forces were reaching the German borders in 1945. Tempests scored several kills against the new German jets, including the Messerschmitt Me 262. Hubert Lange, a Me 262 pilot, said: "the Messerschmitt Me 262's most dangerous opponent was the British Hawker Tempest—extremely fast at low altitudes, highly manoeuvrable and heavily armed." Some were destroyed with a tactic known to the Tempest-equipped No. 135 Wing as the "Rat Scramble":

Tempests on immediate alert took off when an Me 262 was reported airborne. They did not intercept the jet, but instead flew towards the Me 262 and Arado Ar 234 base at Hopsten air base. (which also hosted Bf 109 and Fw 190-day fighters and Messerschmitt Bf 110 and Heinkel He 219 night fighters). The aim was to attack jets on their landing approach, when they were at their most vulnerable, travelling slowly, with flaps down and incapable of rapid acceleration. The German response was the construction of a "flak lane" of over 150 emplacements of the 20 mm Flakvierling quadruple autocannon batteries at Rheine-Hopsten to protect the approaches. As well as the anti-aircraft guns, several piston-engine fighter units based in the area were tasked to cover the jets as they landed. After seven Tempests were lost to flak at Hopsten in a week, the "Rat Scramble" was discontinued.

After the war the wing also existed from 1 April 1953 to 1 January 1960 as a fighter wing based at RAF Bruggen still as part of the 2nd TAF. It consisted on No. 67 Squadron RAF, No. 71 Squadron RAF, No. 112 Squadron RAF & No. 130 Squadron RAF operating Canadair Sabre F.4's and Hawker Hunters before disbanding on 1 January 1960.

== Twenty-first century ==
The wing was reformed at RAF Leeming in 2006, and has carried out several operational activities since:

- Deployed to Šiauliai, Lithuania from April to September 2014 for Operation Azotize (Baltic Air Policing) with Eurofighter Typhoon FGR4
- For Exercise Agile Eagle the unit was trained at a specially designed at Leeming.
- For Exercise 'Griffin Strike 2016' in April 2016, No. 135 EAW became the combined French-British No. 135 Combined Expeditionary Air Wing.
- Deployed to Mihail Kogalniceanu airbase near Constanța, Romania from April to August 2017 under Operation Biloxi with four Typhoon FGR4s of No. 3 (Fighter) Squadron.
- Deployed to Mihail Kogalniceanu airbase near Constanta, Romania in April 2018 under Operation Biloxi with four Typhoon FGR4s of No. 1 (Fighter) Squadron and No. II (Army Cooperation) Squadron.
- Deployed to Šiauliai, Lithuania from April to September 2019 for Operation Azotize with Typhoon FGR4 of No. 6 Squadron.
- Deployed to Šiauliai, Lithuania from April to September 2020 for Operation Azotize with Typhoon FGR4 of No. 6 Squadron.
