= KSDP =

KSDP may refer to:

- Kerala State Drugs and Pharmaceuticals Limited, a public sector company under Government of Kerala, India.
- KSDP (AM), a radio station (830 AM) licensed to serve Sand Point, Alaska, United States.
- The Social Democratic Party of Kyrgyzstan, a political party in Kyrgyzstan.
- The Korean Social Democratic Party, a political party in North Korea.
- The Kansas Democratic Party, the affiliate of the Democratic Party in the state of Kansas.
