= RAF Nordhorn =

Former RAF station in Germany

RAF Nordhorn
- Nordhorn, Lower Saxony in Germany
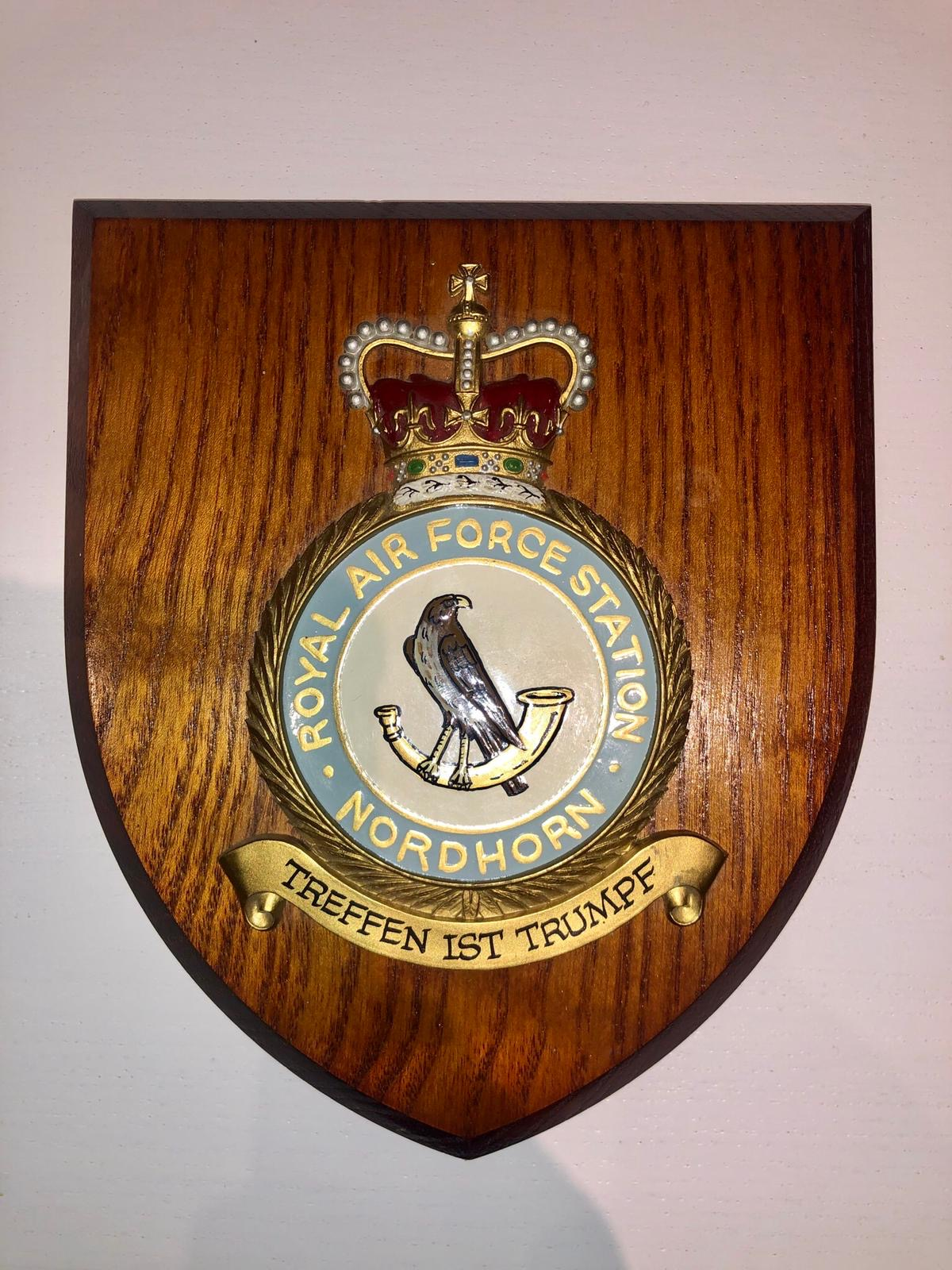
- Station badge

Site information
- Type: Aviation bombing and gunnery range
- Owner: Ministry of Defence (UK) until 2001
- Operator: Royal Air Force
- Controlled by: RAF Second Tactical Air Force (until 2001); German Bundeswehr (since 2001)

Location
- Shown within Lower Saxony
- Coordinates: 52°26′4.2″N 7°10′37.3″E

Site history
- Built: 1945
- In use: 1945-2001

Royal Air Force Nordhorn, more commonly known as RAF Nordhorn, is a former military aviation bombing and gunnery range to the east of nearby Nordhorn, in Lower Saxony, Germany. The range was used by the British Royal Air Force (RAF), the German Luftwaffe, and other NATO air forces and aviation arms of their other branches (such as the Army Air Corps, and the Fleet Air Arm). For decades it was part of RAF Germany.

The first use for gunnery purposes was by the Wehrmacht in 1933, when the heaths to the east of the town of Nordhorn were used for artillery target practice. The RAF took over the range in 1945. The station played host to several Polish units, No. 302 Polish Fighter Squadron, No. 308 Polish Fighter Squadron, No. 317 Polish Fighter Squadron, and No. 662 Squadron RAF for short periods in April 1945. Also resident for a time was No. 131 Wing RAF, the First Polish Fighter Wing.

During the Cold War, the daily flights over the town of Nordhorn were a constant reminder to the local townspeople of the ongoing struggle with the Soviets, despite the great distance to the border with communist East Germany.

Despite the fall of the Berlin Wall in 1989, the base remained as one of the few military facilities used by British Armed Forces in Germany. In 1996, as British forces were withdrawn from the rest of Germany, the Nordhorn aerodrome was expanded. Also in 1996, the UK Ministry of Defence decided to hand control of the base to the German government within a timeframe of ten years. It was transferred back to the German Bundeswehr in March 2001 and the RAF left the site.

== See also ==
- List of former Royal Air Force stations
