= Green Line (film) =

- Directed by: Ebin Raj Maliakal
- Produced by: Tams Films
- Release date: 2019
- Country: India
- Language: Malayalam

Green Line is a 2019 Indian documentary film written and directed by Ebin Raj Maliakal. . The film explores the efforts, sacrifices, controversies, and challenges surrounding organ and body donation in Kerala.The film unfolds through multiple perspectives on organ and body donation, bringing together different subject positions and experiences.Through these contrasting perspectives, the film examines both the possibilities and limitations of organ donation and questions some of the assumptions surrounding the practice. Green Line has been screened at and received awards from several international film festivals across the globe.
