= No. 18 Sector RAF =

No. 18 (Fighter) Sector RAF 18th Training Wing RFC No. 18 (Polish) (Fighter) Wing RAF
- Active: 1916-19; 1943-44; 1944
- Country: United Kingdom
- Branch: Royal Flying Corps; Royal Air Force
- Type: Sector; Previously Wing

No. 18 Sector RAF is a former Royal Air Force Sector that was operational during both the First and the Second World Wars.

== First World War ==
18th (Training) Wing was formed on 25 March 1916 in London controlling airfields within London. It joined Eastern Group Command on 10 January 1917 and moved to various locations within London until 7 August 1919 when it moved to Ford Junction and was disbanded on 1 October 1919.

== Second World War ==
No. 18 (Polish) (Fighter) Wing RAF was formed during December 1943 at RAF Northolt controlling:

- No. 131 Airfield Headquarters RAF
- No. 133 Airfield Headquarters RAF
- No. 135 Airfield Headquarters RAF (from 10 April 1944)

The wing was disbanded on 12 May 1944.

No. 18 (Fighter) Sector was formed on 12 May 1944 at RAF Chailey controlling:

- No. 131 Wing RAF
- No. 133 Wing RAF
- No. 135 Wing RAF

The sector disbanded still at Chailey on 12 July 1944.

== See also ==
- List of wings of the Royal Air Force
