= Kalavoor =

- Village
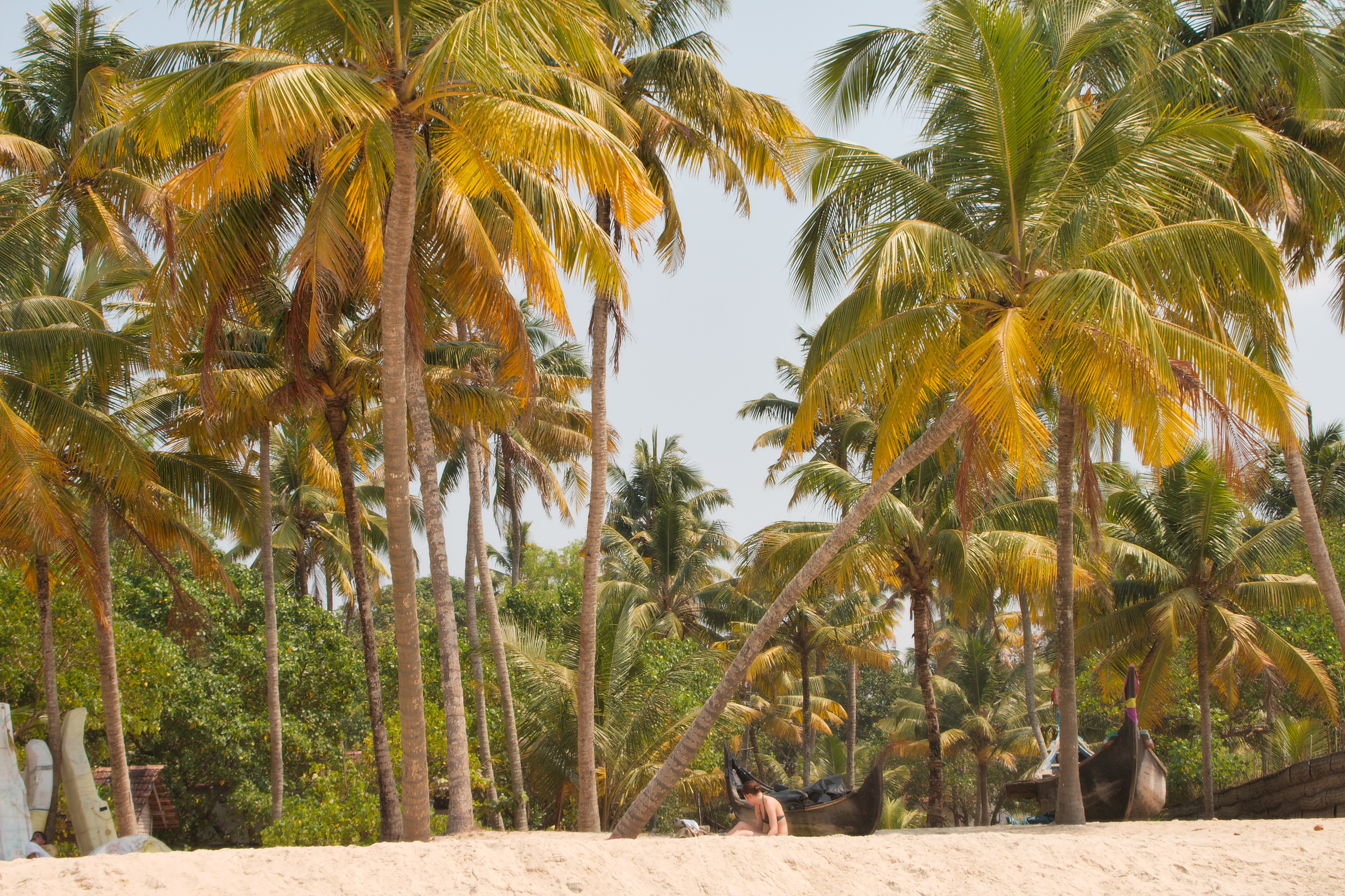
- Kalavoor Beach
- Interactive map of Kalavoor
- Coordinates: 9°33′0″N 76°19′0″E
- Country: India
- State: Kerala
- District: Alappuzha
- Elevation: 4.5 m (15 ft)

Population (2011)
  - Total: 29,808

Languages
  - Official: Malayalam, English
- Time zone: UTC+5:30 (IST)
- PIN: 688522
- Telephone code: 0478
- Nearest city: Alappuzha
- Lok Sabha constituency: Alappuzha
- Vidhan Sabha constituency: Alappuzha

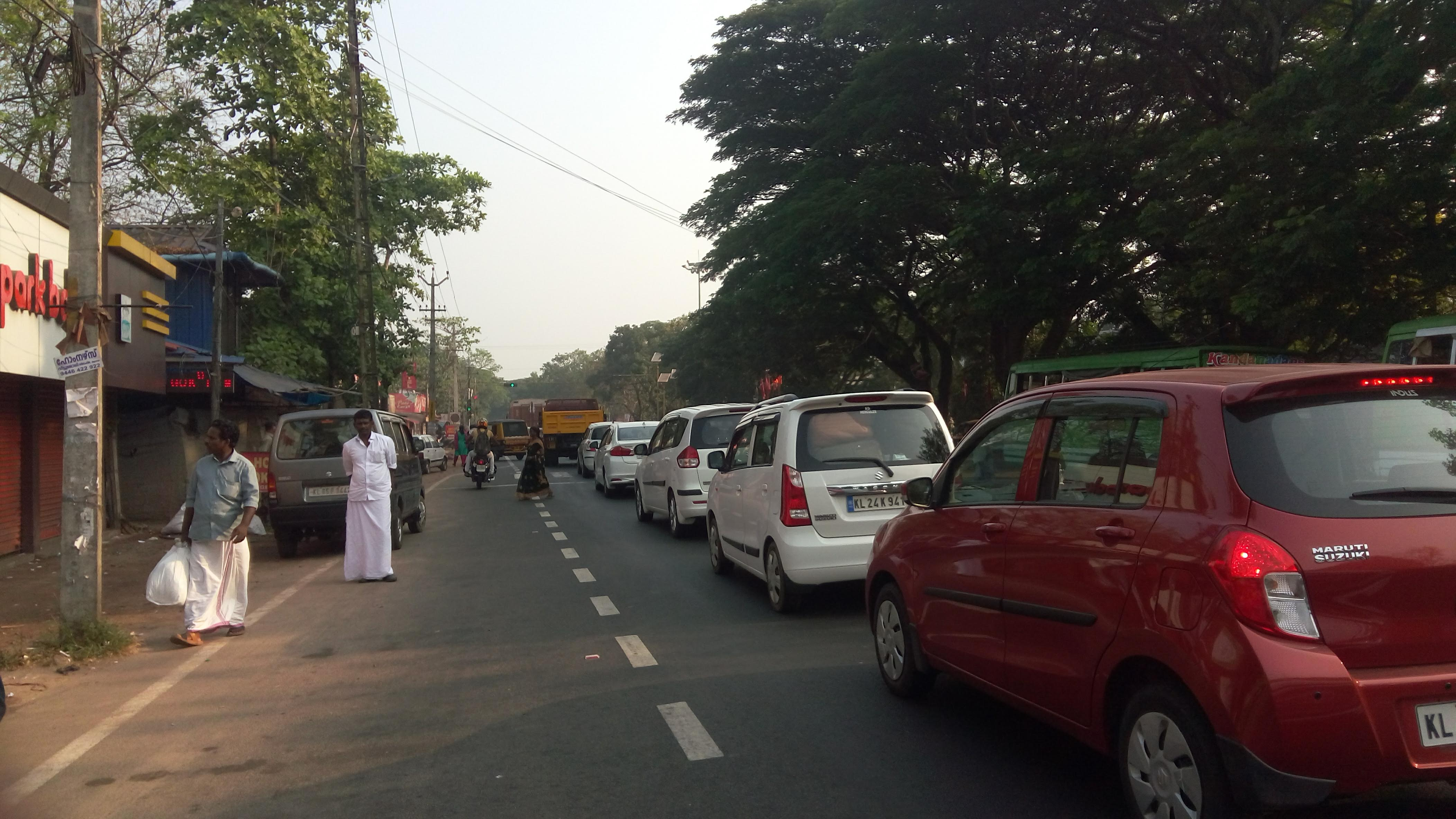
Kalavoor Junction on a busy day.

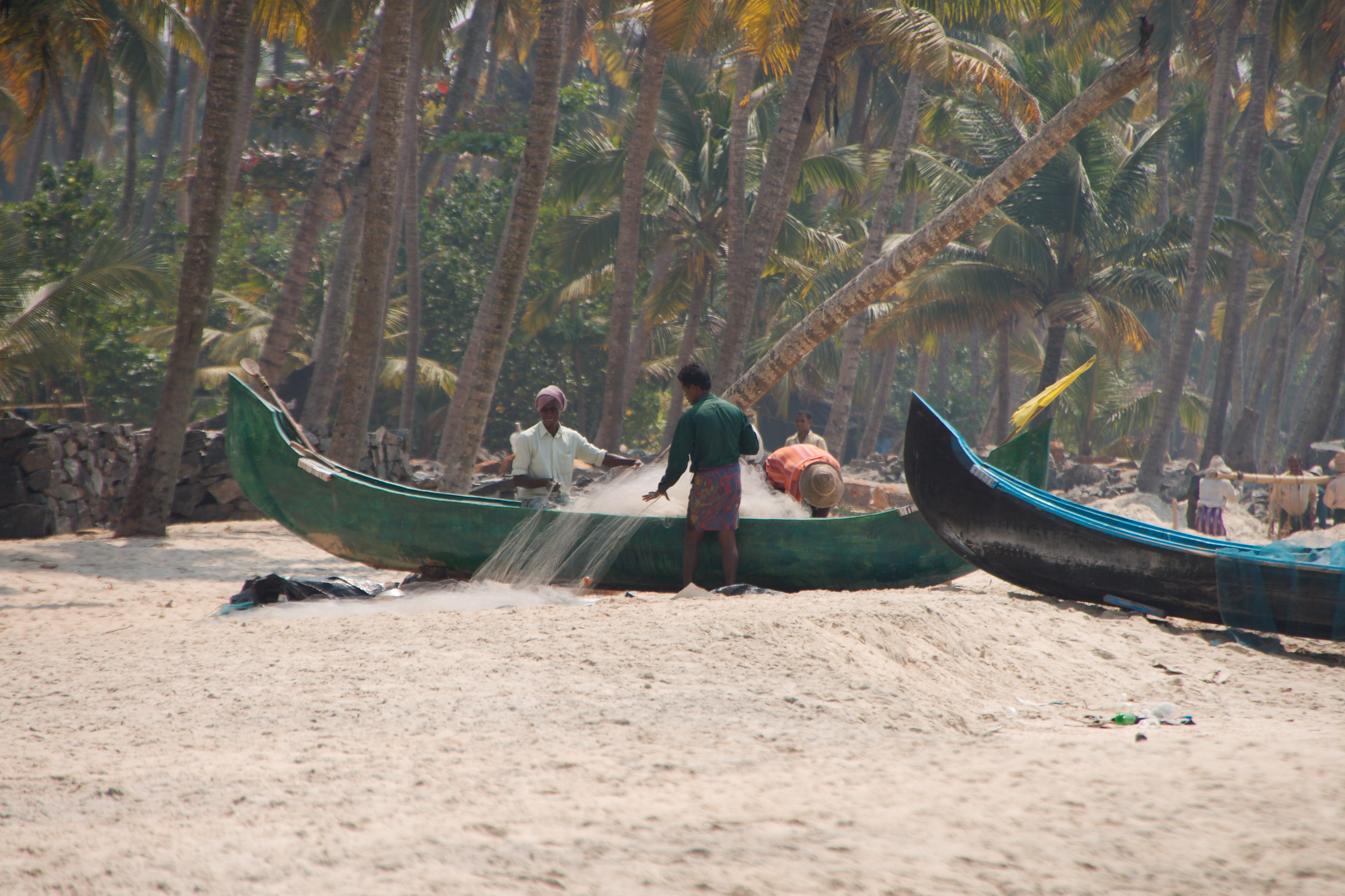
Fishermen in Kalavoor

Kalavoor is a village located in National Highway 66 at Alappuzha district in the Indian state of Kerala.

== Location ==
Kalavoor is 8 km (5.0 mi) to the north of Alappuzha city and 45 km (28 mi) to the South of Cochin. National Highway 66, passes through Kalavoor.

== Transportation ==
It is well-connected by road and rail transportation. The railway station situated roughly 1 km away from the center has passenger services. KSRTC buses including limited and superfast services have stoppages. There is an auto-taxi hub too.

== Institutions and buildings ==
- International Coir Museum
- Central Coir Research Institute
- All India Radio Relay Station

== Industries ==
Kalavoor is home to several large scale and small scale industries that extend from Pharmaceuticals to Coir products. Some of the notable industries are :

- Kerala State Drugs and Pharmaceuticals Limited

== Demographics ==
As of 2011 India census, Kalavoor has a population of 29,808 with 14,458 males and 15,350 females living in 7,385 households. Population of children with age range of 0–6 years, is 2717 which is 9.12% of the total population. The sex ratio of Kalavoor is 1062, lower than the state average of 1087. The child sex ratio is 959, which again is lower than the state average of 964.

Hinduism, Islamism and Christianity are the three major religions found.

== Notable people ==
- Ebin Raj Maliakal, documentary filmmaker
- Ratheesh, Malayalam actor
- Kalavoor Ravikumar, Malayalam screenwriter and movie director
