= Ebin Raj Maliakal =

Indian documentary filmmaker

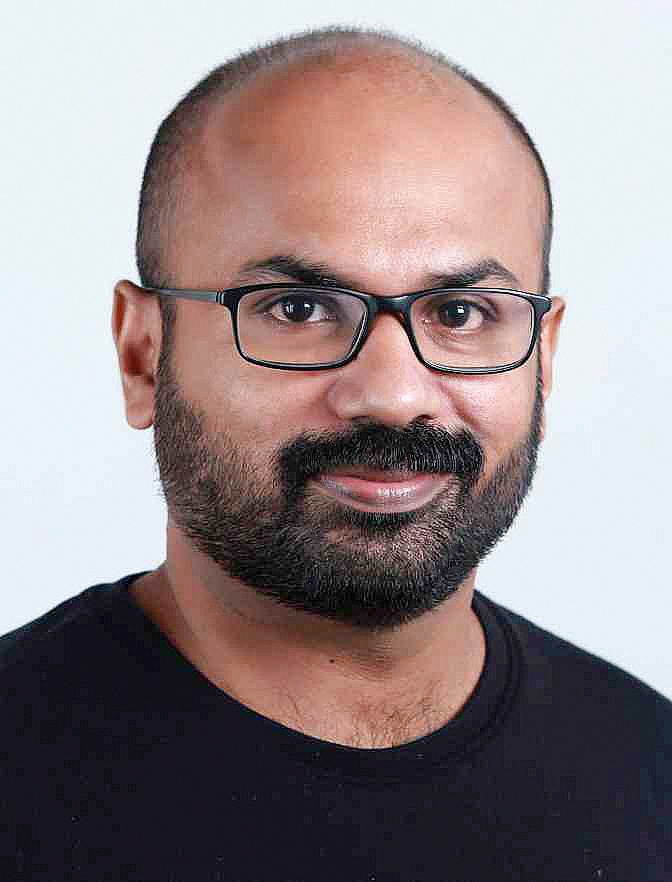
- Born: Kalavoor, Alleppey
- Occupations: Filmmaker, writer
- Years active: 1998–present
- Known for: Documentary Films
- Notable work: Green Line, Novel Life, Madhuram Ninte Jeevitham, Lokame Yathara
- Spouse: Sunitha Santhan
- Children: Augusta Maria, Jophine Anna

Ebin Raj Maliakal is an Indian documentary filmmaker and author. His notable films are Green Line (2019), Novel life (2014), Madhuram Ninte Jeevitham (2008), Lokame Yathara (2008). He has won the Kerala state television award, Kerala Film Critics Association Award and a Film Fellowship. His films has been screened at International film festivals worldwide and have won numerous International film awards. He serves as a Panel director at the Kerala State Film Development Corporation and the Kerala Information and Public Relations Department.

== Biography ==
He was born in the village of Kalavoor in the Alappuzha district of Kerala, India. His father, M.V. Thomas Raju, worked at Excel Glasses Ltd. in Alappuzha, while his mother, T.D. Agesta, was a teacher at Holy Family HSS in Kattoor, Alappuzha. He earned his MSc in Electronic Media from Bharathiar University, Coimbatore, M.com in Finance from the University of Kerala and a P.G. diploma in Television Production from the Central University Hyderabad. He also underwent training in science journalism and communication. Since 1998, he has written and published the articles on film and literature. He began his career in television media in 2004 as a junior Program producer at Shalom television. He scripted and directed numerous television programs and live shows and also worked in the United States on television program production.

== Filmography ==
- Beyond Vision (2005)
- Lokame Yathara (2008)
- Madhuram Ninte Jeevitham (2008)
- Novel life (2014)
- Green Line (2019)
- Smaraka Dinangal (Monument Days) 2024
- A Second Chance (2026)

== Books ==
- Documentary Thirakathakal (2015) H&C Books Thrissur

== Honors ==
- Kerala State Television Award 2009
- Best Documentary film, Image Award
- Kerala Film Critics Association Award 2014
- Best Health Documentary Award, NFAI, Pune 2019
- Academy Film Fellowship 2018

== International Awards ==
- American Golden Picture International Film Festival Award, Florida USA
- Europe Film Festival Award, London, U.K.
- Best Istanbul Film Festival Award, Turkey
- World Film Carnival Award, Singapore
- Berlin Flash Film Festival Award, Germany
- Digital Griffix Film Festival Award, Montreal Canada
- UK Monthly Film Festival Award, Norwich, UK
- Indo French international film Festival Award
- Indo Singapore international film festival award
- Athens International Monthly Art Film Festival Award, Athens, Greece
- Andromeda Film Festival Award, İstanbul, Turkey
- Bhutan International film festival award

== Film Festivals / screenings ==
- Hollywood Boulevard Film Festival, Los Angeles, USA
- New York Movie Awards, New York, USA
- Kino DUEL International Film Festival, Moscow, Russia
- Eastern Europe Film Festival
- Paris International Film Awards, Paris
- Rome Interdependent Prisma Film Awards, Rome, Italy
- New York International Film Awards, New York, USA
- ICAN/LAX International Film Competition, Pennsylvania, USA
- MLC Awards, Green Bay, Wisconsin, USA
- Golden Wheat Awards, İstanbul, Turkey
- Sweden Film festival, Stockholm, Sweden
- lift- Off Global Network, London, UK
- Eurasia International Monthly Film Festival, Moscow, Russia
- International documentary and Short film festival of Kerala, India
