= No. 131 Wing RAF =

No. 131 Wing RAF No. 131 (Polish) (Fighter) Wing RAF No. 131 Airfield Headquarters (Polish) RAF
- Country: United Kingdom
- Allegiance: (Poland) Polish Government in exile
- Branch: Royal Air Force
- Role: Air supremacy
- Size: Wing
- Last base: RAF Hethel

Aircraft flown
- Attack: Hawker Typhoon
- Fighter: Supermarine Spitfire Mk.IX

No. 131 (Polish) (Fighter) Wing RAF is a former Royal Air Force (RAF) wing that was operational during the Second World War, mainly staffed by Polish personnel as part of the Polish Air Forces in France and Great Britain.

The unit was previously No. 131 Airfield Headquarters (Polish) RAF during 1943.

== History ==
No. 131 Airfield Headquarters (Polish) RAF was formed at RAF Northolt on 4 October 1943 within No. 18 Wing RAF.

No. 131 Wing was formed on 12 May 1944 within No. 18 Sector RAF, No. 84 Group RAF, RAF Second Tactical Air Force at RAF Chailey. It moved to RAF Appledram on 28 June 1944, then to RAF Ford and it crossed the Channel to France on 22 July 1944 going to B.12 Caen/Ellon. It then used B.10 Plumelot, B.131 Londinieres, B.51 Lille-Vendeville, B.70 Antwerp/Deurne, B.61 Ghent/St Denis Westrem, B.60 Grimbergen, B.77 Gilze-Rijen, B. 101 Nordhorn, B.113 Varrelbusch and B.111 Ahlhorn. It moved back to England and RAF Hethel where it was disbanded on 2 January 1947.

== See also ==
- List of Wings of the Royal Air Force
