= RAF Kasfareet =

RAF Kasfareet RAF Geneifa
- Ismailia Governorate in Egypt
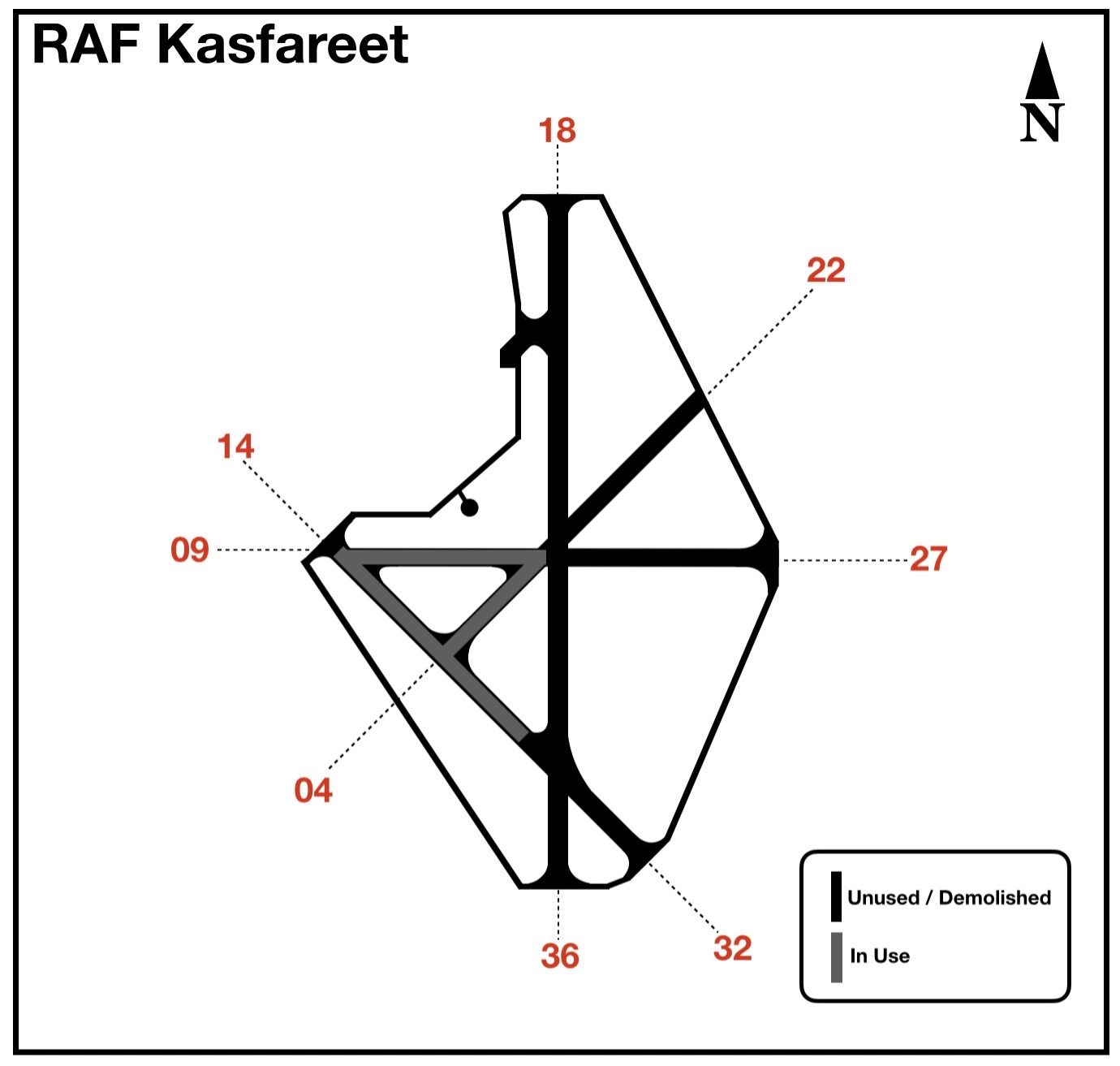
- A modern diagram of RAF Kasfareet.

Site information
- Owner: Air Ministry
- Operator: Royal Air Force

Location
- Shown within Egypt
- Coordinates: 30°15′N 32°25′E

Site history
- Built: 1940
- In use: 1941 - 1955
- Battles/wars: Mediterranean and Middle East theatre of World War II

Airfield information
- Elevation: 149.8 metres (491 ft) AMSL
Runways
Direction	Length and surface
04/22	841 metres (2,759 ft) Bituminous
09/27	1,188 metres (3,898 ft) Bituminous
14/32	1,240 metres (4,068 ft) Bituminous
18/36	1,871 metres (6,138 ft) Bituminous

RAF Kasfareet (LG-212) which is formerly known as RAF Geneifa is a former Royal Air Force station located in Ismailia Governorate, Egypt. The station opened in 1940 as a logistics, maintenance and transit hub supporting the Mediterranean and Middle East theatre of World War II. It was transferred to the Egyptian government in 1955, with its maintenance components remaining unused.

== History ==
In 1940, the airfield was constructed, and the 107 Maintenance Unit and 21 Personnel Transit Center was based here during the Second World War. 107 MU operated a maintenance, three hangars, and a repair and flight test center in the airfield. RAF Kasfareet would commonly experience sandstorms. There was also a Royal Canadian Air Force presence here. In June 1943, the No. 1 (Middle East) Aircrew Reception Centre was formed at RAF Kasfareet, which managed and redistributed newly arrived or recruited RAF aircrew from the station. RAF Kasfareet operated as a transit camp for ferrying aircraft, which also treated wounded personnel brought back from active combat. Personnel within the RAF Middle East Pool at Kasfareet were entrained from Port Tewfik. In 1946, seven surplus Short Stirlings were scrapped under the 107 MU at Kasfareet, three of which arrived from Cairo West. The aircraft would first be defueled, then the props and engine were dismantled and removed. The decommissioning process took place within the hangars as thievery for unused aircraft parts was common.

=== Post-war ===
Around 1955, the RAF transferred the airfield alongside RAF Shallufa to the Egyptian Air Force. Runways 04/22, 14/32, and 09/27 was closed shortly afterwards. The former RAF maintenance, repair, and flight test center was not utilized by the Egyptian Air Force after the transfer. During the 1956 Suez Crisis, Kasfareet was targeted and bombed by Anglo-French forces. These operations were further supported by the Israeli Air Force (IAF), when Israel formed a secret agreement with the two countries. On 30 October 1956, 116 Squadron of the IAF attacked Kasfareet Airfield as its secondary target with six Mystère IVs, each armed with rocket pods.

Located north of the airfield is the Kasfareet Air Force Training Center, which serves as a base for training pilots and personnel in all fields of military aviation. The center provides courses that cover aeronautical sciences, flight tactics, and aircraft maintenance. The facility has high attendance of trainees and participants from various military units, and has a generally positive reputation.

== Layout ==
RAF Kasfareet stored 28,800 gallons of AV GAS and 28,800 gallons of jet fuel. Accommodated with the airfield was a control tower, an administrative building, a 36-bed infirmary, and an armory. RAF personnel stationed at the airfield slept in tents, and in billets. The perimeter of the camp was guarded by fences and searchlights. Kasfareet was operated by four bituminous runways, which only one was used after the transfer of ownership.

== Units ==
The following units that were once formed, or based at Kasfareet:

=== Support units ===
- 1 (Middle East) Aircrew Reception Centre, June 1943 - September 1943
- 5001 RAF Airfield Construction Squadron
- 5355 RAF Airfield Construction Wing
- 107 RAF Maintenance Unit
- 21 Personnel Unit Transit Centre

=== Operational units ===
The following flying units that were once based at RAF Kasfareet at one point.

- Detachment from No. 14 Squadron RAF between March and June 1943 with the Martin Marauder I and the North American Mustang I
- No. 47 Squadron RAF between 22 December 1941 and 25 January 1942 with the Vickers Wellesley
- No. 127 Squadron RAF reformed here and was active between 26 August and 29 September 1941.
- No. 237 (Rhodesia) Squadron RAF between 24 August and 21 September 1941 with the Gloster Gladiator II and the Hawker Hurricane I
- No. 417 Squadron RAF between 4 June and 18 July 1942
- Ground echelon from No. 603 (City of Edinburgh) Squadron AAF between 4 and 28 June 1942
- Detachment from No. 1908 Flight, No. 651 Squadron RAF between November 1951 and November 1955

=== Other aircraft ===
The following aircraft could be operated from RAF Kasfareet in an emergency:

- Douglas C-54 Skymaster
- Douglas C-124 Globemaster II
- North American F-100C Super Sabre
- F-100D Super Sabre

== See also ==
- List of North African airfields during World War II
