= Airfield Construction Branch RAF =

Airfield Construction Branch
- Active: 1939 - 1 April 1966
- Disbanded: 1 April 1966
- Country: United Kingdom
- Role: Civil engineering and airfield construction / repair

The RAF Airfield Construction Branch (previously called the RAF Airfield Construction Service) constructed and repaired runways, hard-standings, buildings and other facilities as required by the Royal Air Force in the United Kingdom and overseas.

== Predecessor Organisation ==
Having gained consent from the French authorities, in 1939, to establish Flying Training Schools in France, the next step was to construct aerodromes. The RAF approached the army and were rebuffed. As a consequence, No. 1 Air Ministry Works Unit was established, its aim being to manage these construction projects, with French and Belgian civil engineering companies carrying out the construction. The unit was evacuated to the UK following the Fall of France in June 1940.

The unit was occupied in overseeing runway repairs for the rest of that year, with some assistance in filling-in craters being provided by the Royal Pioneer Corps. The latter were withdrawn at the end of 1940, which resulted in the RAF forming Nos. 1 & 2 Works Squadrons. By the end of 1941, this had grown to six squadrons and, in July 1942, these units were officially given the title of the RAF Works Service.

== Airfield Construction Service ==
The service had grown to 19 squadrons and was re-titled RAF Airfield Construction Service in May 1943. The Service was now grouped into Wings, each wing consisting of four squadrons; one plant and three construction. The organisation grew to a point where it employed 30,000 people. It became clear that, when a second front opened in Northern Europe, there would be a need for the services of the ACS to deploy overseas. Acknowledging this, the RAF created No. 85 (Base) Group HQ at the end of 1943, and allocated five of the seven Wings to this Group, which deployed to Normandy after D-Day. It was perceived that the Luftwaffe would not be idle following the landings, and the two remaining wings were to be used repairing damage from Luftwaffe attrition raids. In preparation for the landings, in 1943, the RAF Airfield Construction Service built 23 Advanced Landing Grounds in Southern England.

The first overseas deployment was in May 1942, in Iceland, with 5201 Squadron being formed for that task. Similarly, the requirement to build and maintain an airstrip in the Azores saw the formation of 5020 Squadron in September 1943. An eighth Wing (5358) was created for deployment to the Far East, alongside 5353 Wing.

== Airfield Construction Branch ==
At the time of the Berlin Airlift, the service was renamed the Airfield Construction Branch. Its Wings were responsible for the construction and maintenance of RAF infrastructure in Germany (2nd TAF), until the Wings themselves were disbanded in 1957. The Branch Depot moved three times, starting first at RAF Church Lawford with plant training at Ryton-on-Dunsmore. It then moved to RAF Wellesbourne Mountford, using the sand and gravel quarries at Claverdon before it moved finally with the plant training to RAF Waterbeach. The Squadrons were to support RAF operations in overseas deployments until 1966.

=== Airfield Construction Squadrons 1951-66 ===
In November 1951, 5355 Wing was established at RAF Kasfareet, Suez, with Nos. 1 and 2 Squadrons. In June 1953, the Squadrons were renamed respectively Nos 5001 and 5002 Airfield Maintenance Squadrons. 5001 Squadron was based at Kasfareet, 5002 Squadron at RAF Abu Sueir.

5002 Squadron was disbanded in October 1955 and in October 1956, it was re-formed at RAF Wellesbourne Mountford to prepare for duty in Egypt in support of British forces following President Nasser's nationalisation of the Suez Canal. The British action in Egypt was halted before the Squadron could be deployed and it was disbanded again in 1958.

In May 1954, 5001 was renamed 5001 Airfield Construction (Light) Squadron. In August 1955, it moved to RAF El Adem and in September to RAF Idris at Tripoli. In April 1959, it moved to RAF Akrotiri in Cyprus.

In 1961, 5001 Squadron, based at RAF Akrotiri in Cyprus, had a large, long term detachment at RAF El Adem south of Tobruk in Libya. In addition to carrying out a variety of construction tasks in Cyprus and at El Adem, the Squadron undertook work at Tabriz and Babol-Sar in Iran. In 1962, in Exercise Egg Flip, a detachment of the Squadron constructed a large earth landing strip at Bomba on the Libyan coast near Derna. Later that year, a small detachment marked out a landing strip in the far south of Libya at Kufra as an emergency diversion for planes unable to land at El Adem. In 1963, a large detachment of the Squadron moved at short notice to the Far East to undertake work at Kuching in Sarawak and at Labuan and Tawau in North Borneo in support of RAF operations following the Indonesian confrontation in Borneo. In September 1963, the Squadron moved to RAF Seletar in Singapore where it remained until the Branch was disbanded.

In September 1953, 5003 Squadron was formed at RAF Lichfield but, in November 1957, it completed a move to RAF Wellesbourne Mountford, where it became part of Training Wing and numbered up to 500 personnel. Its detachments undertook a variety of construction tasks in the UK. Between 1958 and 1961, these included projects at RAF Acklington, Abingdon, Booker, Coningsby, Faldingworth, Finningley, Hemswell, Lindholme, Lyneham, Martlesham Heath, Nocton Hall, North Luffenham, Swinderby and Syerston.

In November 1953, 5004 Squadron was formed at RAF Bruggen in Germany. It undertook a variety of tasks in RAF Second Tactical Air Force including improvements to the runway at RAF Bruggen. In 1956, the Squadron returned to the UK to be based at RAF Wellesbourne Mountford. The Squadron formed the major part of Operation Hardrock Task Force on St Kilda in 1957 and 1958. Operation Hardrock Task Force was formed from 5004 Squadron at RAF Wellesbourne Mountford early in 1957, to construct, for the Army, a missile-tracking radar station on the island of St. Kilda, an uninhabited rocky outcrop some 60 miles west of the Outer Hebrides. A temporary RAF mainland base was established at Cairnryan and personnel, plant and transport were shipped to the island by Army tank landing craft (LCTs), based in Portsmouth, but sailing from Cairnryan, near Stranraer via Benbecula. The task required the opening of a quarry out there and the construction of buildings and a road, with a bridge, to the mountain-top radar site. This Building and Civil Engineering task was challenging, because of the unpredictable, adverse nature of weather conditions out there, which precluded work being done throughout the Winter months. However, the task was completed by Autumn 1958.

In April 1959, 5004 Squadron moved to RAF Khormaksar in Aden. It returned to the UK in December 1964 and was disbanded at RAF Waterbeach in May 1965.

== Disbandment ==
The Airfield Construction Branch was disbanded on 1 April 1966. Its responsibilities (and the RAF staff who wished to) were transferred to the Royal Engineers.
