= International Coir Museum =

Museum in India

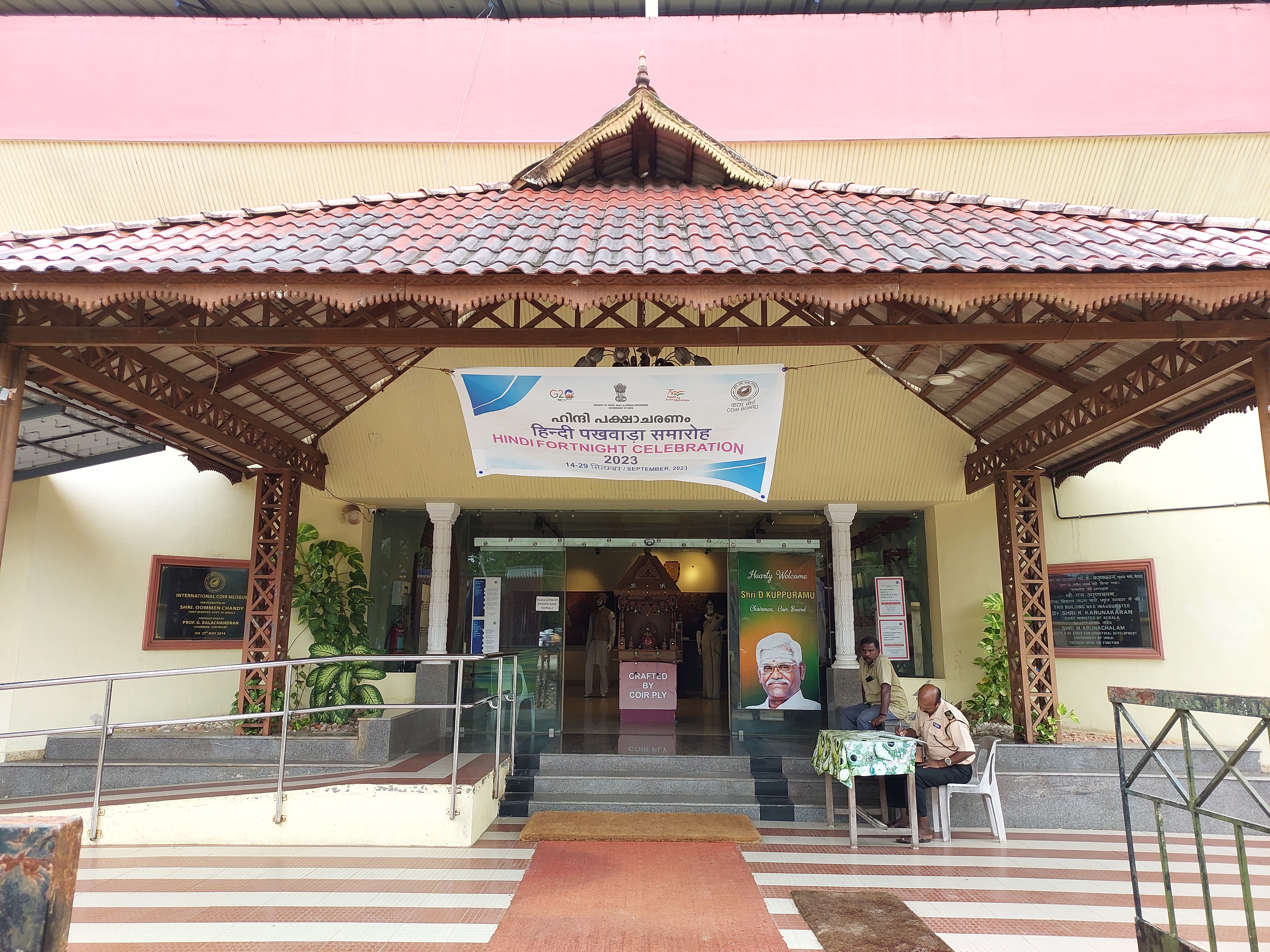
- Established: May 27, 2014; 12 years ago
- Location: Kalavoor, Alappuzha district, Kerala, India
- Coordinates: 9.5632°N 76.3284°E
- Type: Industry museum
- Collections: Coir products and production tools
- Owner: Coir Board of India

International Coir Museum is a museum located in Kerala state of India. The museum is located in Kalavoor in Alappuzha district. It is a museum under Coir Board of India, a statutory body under the Government of India. This is the world's first and currently (as of 2025) only coir museum.

== Overview ==
The coir industry is closely linked to the social, cultural and economic aspects of Kerala. The International Coir Museum is being established in Alappuzha district because Alappuzha is a region with a large scale of coir, coir products and industries. This is the world's first and currently (as of 2025) only coir museum.

== History ==
The idea of establishing an international coir museum was proposed by the then Coir Board Chairman Prof. G. Balachandran. The decision to start the International Coir Museum was taken at the 208th Coir Board meeting held in Kochi in May 2012. In 2014, the Diamond Jubilee year of the formation of the Coir Board of India, the Board established the museum that depicts the historical events and the evolution of technological advancements in the coir sector. The International Museum was inaugurated by the then Chief Minister of Kerala, Oommen Chandy, at the Coir Board Complex, Kalavoor on 27 May 2014.

== Aim ==
The International Coir Museum was established to showcase the revolutionary developments in the coir industry of India over the years.

== Attractions ==
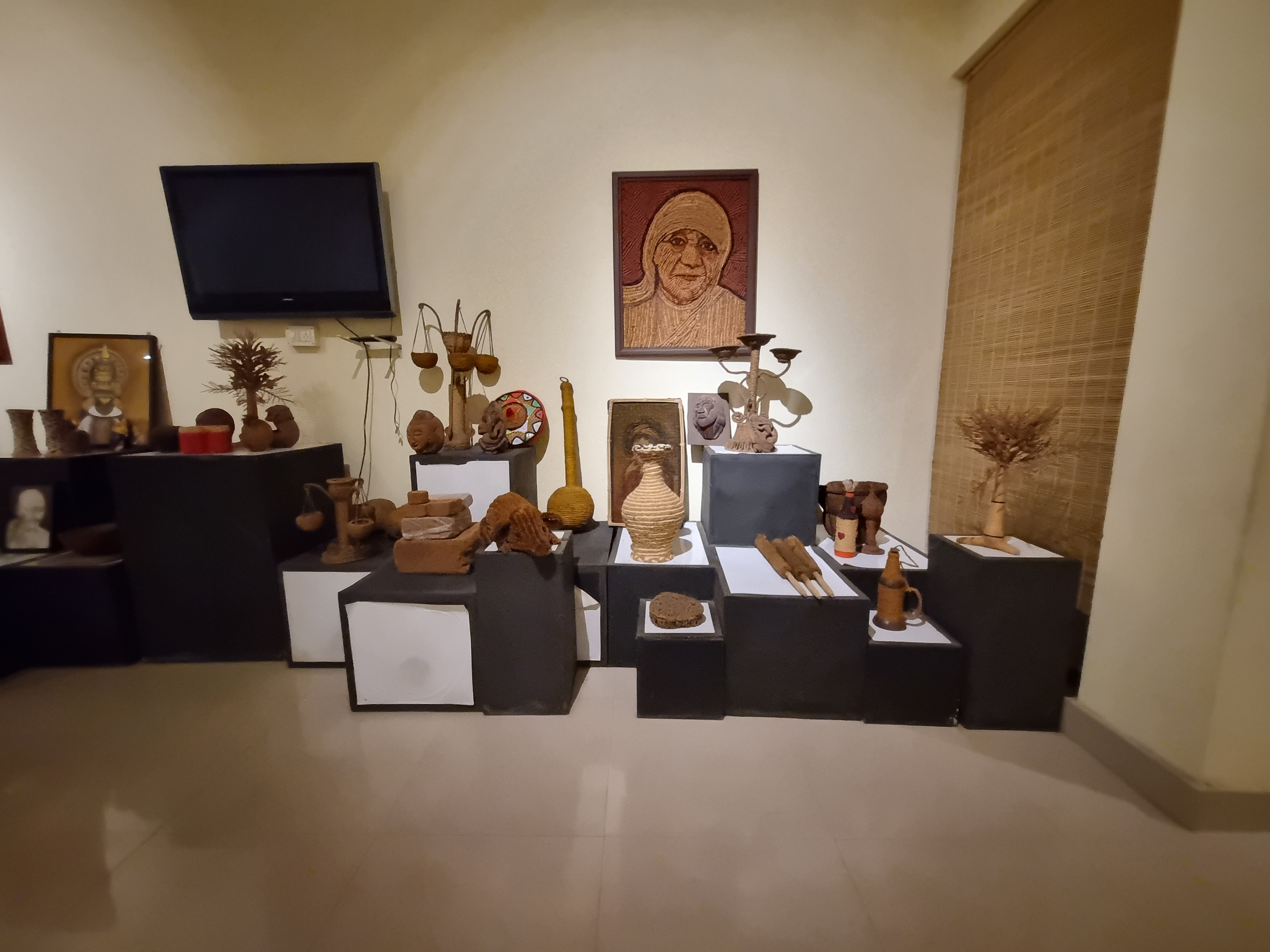
Coir artworks inside the museum

The museum showcases the traditional processes of manufacturing coir and coir products, the development in technology, retting, fiber extraction and the advent of mechanization in the coir sector. A short video film of the coir industry displayed here provides information about the origin and growth of the industry and the latest developments through research and development.

There is a souvenir shop adjacent to the museum where visitors can purchase a variety of coir handicrafts, coir doormats, and coir jewelry.

== Entry ==
This Museum is opened to the public 9.30 am to 5.00 pm every day except Monday. There is entry fees for public.

== Location ==
The museum is located in Kalavoor in Alappuzha district. The nearest bus station is Alappuzha Bus Stand, 8 km away, the nearest railway station is Kalavur Railway Station, while the nearest major railway station is Alappuzha Railway Station, 10 km away, and the nearest airport is Cochin International Airport, 75 km away.
