= Kerala State Drugs and Pharmaceuticals Limited =

Indian government company

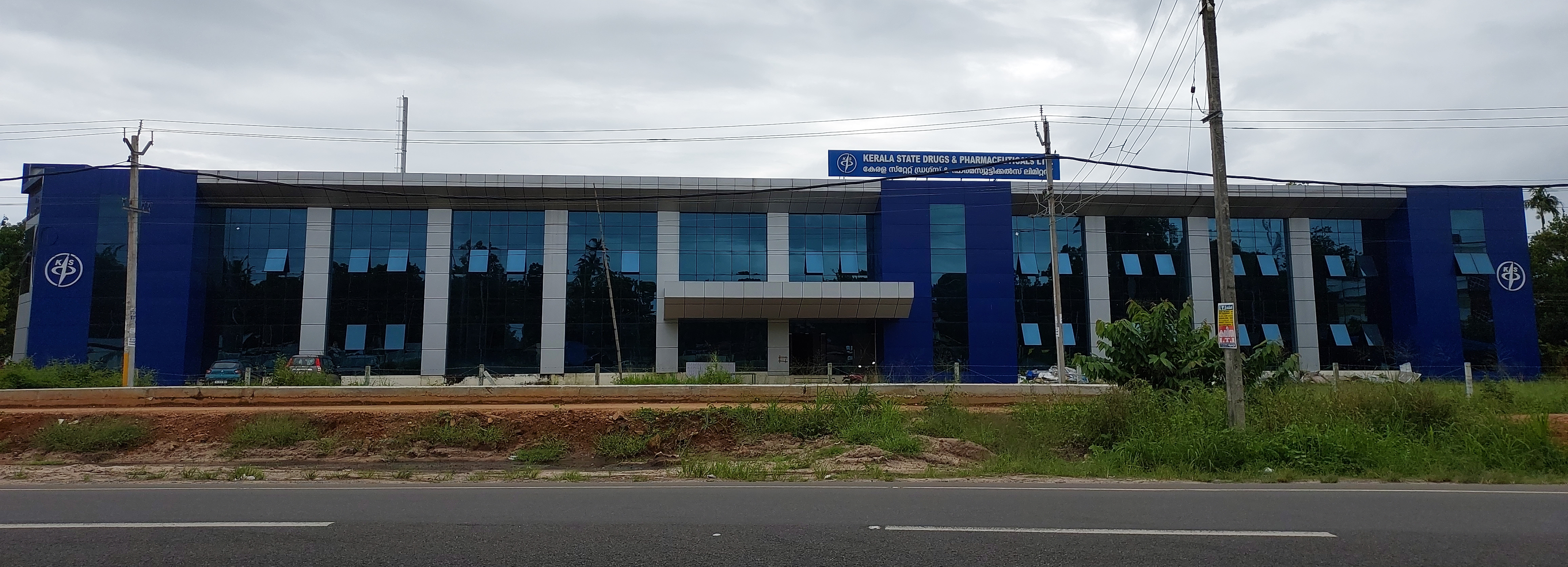
- Type: Public Sector Company
- Industry: Pharmaceutical industry
- Founded: 1974
- Headquarters: Kalavoor, Alappuzha, Kerala, India
- Area served: India
- Key people: Shri. C.B Chandrababu (chairman), Sri. E.A Subramanian(managing director) Ms. Rayapureddy Pavani(state Drug controller)
- Products: Pharmaceuticals
- Number of employees: 112
- Website: www.ksdp.co.in

Kerala State Drugs and Pharmaceutical Limited (KSDP) is an enterprise fully owned by Government of Keralam for manufacturing essential and life-saving medicines primarily to cater the needs of Government hospitals in the State. Alongside its primary objective, K.S.D.P exports drugs to other Indian states and also supplies to the Jan Oushadi. Now the company is a major supplier of Quality drugs to Kerala State Medical Service Corporation ( KMSCL ).']. K.S.D.P was established in the year 1974 and is situated in Kalavoor, Alappuzha.

== Accreditation ==
The company received Good manufacturing practice (GMP) approval for its manufacturing facility from the World Health Organization. This would enable K.S.D.P to supply medicines to countries that follow quality standard based on GMP under the brand name of Kerala Generics. These countries include African nations such as Ghana, Kenya and Zimbabwe, and Asian countries like Cambodia.

== Activities ==
=== COVID-19 pandemic ===
During the COVID-19 pandemic in India in 2020, K.S.D.P was given order to manufacture One Lakh units of Hand Sanitizers by the Kerala Government for supply to the general public at cheaper rates.

== See also ==
- Public sector undertakings in Kerala
