= No. 127 Squadron RAF =

Defunct flying squadron of the Royal Air Force

- Active: (RFC) 1 March 1918 – 4 July 1918 (RAF) 29 June 1941 – 30 April 1945
- Country: United Kingdom
- Branch: Royal Air Force
- Part of: RAF Fighter Command
- Motto(s): Eothen (Latin: Out of the east)
- Aircraft: Gloster Gladiator; Hawker Hurricane; Supermarine Spitfire
- Battle honours: World War II • Home Defence • Middle East • Italy • Western Desert • Invasion of Europe

Insignia
- Squadron Badge heraldry: A tarantula
- Squadron Codes: EJ (June 1942 – January 1943); 9N April 1944 – April 1945)

No. 127 Squadron RAF was a squadron of the United Kingdom's Royal Flying Corps and Royal Air Force. Originally formed in early 1918 for service in the First World War, it was disbanded after six months without commencing operations. Reformed in 1941 for the Second World War, it served in the Middle East, the Mediterranean and in Europe.

== History ==
No. 127 Squadron was first formed for service in the First World War as a day bomber unit in February 1918, but was disbanded on 4 July of that year without commencing operations.

It was reformed in late June 1941, as a detachment of Hawker Hurricane and Gloster Gladiator fighters from No. 4 Service Flying Training School at Habbaniya in Iraq. It operated briefly in Syria supporting the 10th Indian Division in its campaign against the Vichy French. In July, the detachment returned to Habbaniya.

In mid-September, it was reestablished from No. 249 Squadron at RAF Kasfareet, its pilots operating an aircraft ferry service between here and Hurghada. In February 1942, it received Hurricane fighters and, bearing the squadron code 'EJ', for the next two years operated these in Palestine and in the campaign in North Africa. In April 1944, it was transferred to the United Kingdom for Operation Overlord, the Allied invasion of Normandy. Assigned the squadron code '9N' and equipped with the Supermarine Spitfire IX HF, it operated from Lympne in Air Defence of Great Britain, though under the operational control of RAF Second Tactical Air Force (2nd TAF).

In August No. 127 Squadron commenced operating from France, supporting the advance of the Allied ground forces through France, Belgium and into Germany. It disbanded on 30 April 1945, by which time it was stationed at Oldenburg.

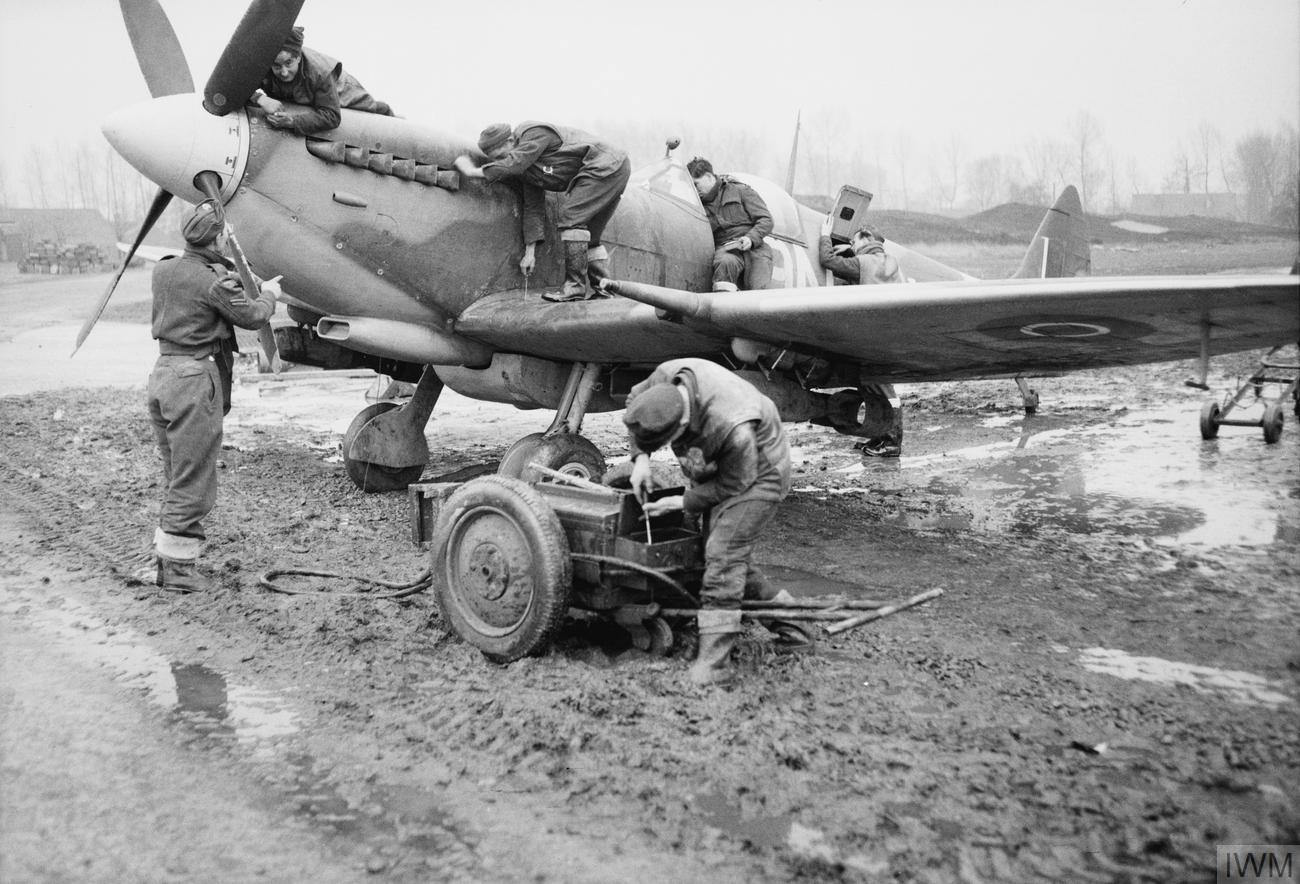
A Supermarine Spitfire fighter of No. 127 Squadron on the airfield at Grimbergen in December 1944
