= Coir Board of India =

Government organization in Kochi, India

The Coir Board is a statutory body established by the Government of India under the Coir Industry Act 1953 (No. 45 of 1953) for the promotion and development of the coir (coconut fibre) industry in India.

== Organisation ==
It is based in Kochi and Alappuzha. The head office of the Coir Board is in Kochi and the research and training office is at Alappuzha and Bangalore. The coir industry is one of India's traditional industries that is still economically important. The Coir Board has regional offices in different parts of India, wherever there is a significant industry presence. The board works for the promotion, research, education, and training of the industry. The board functions under the Ministry of Micro, Small and Medium Enterprises.

== Industry ==
The coir industry employs more than 7 lakh (700,000) people, a majority of whom are from rural areas who belong to economically weaker sections of society.

The Coir Board has worked actively to support the International Year of Natural Fibres 2009.

== Chairperson ==
Shri Vipul Goel is the current chairman of Coir Board of India.

== See also ==
- Coconut in India
  - Coconut production in Kerala
  - International Coir Museum
- Cooperative movement in India
  - Amul, India's largest milk and dairy brand cooperative societies network
  - Coffee Board of India
  - Spices Board of India
  - Tea Board of India
