= RAF Chailey =

Former RAF station in East Sussex, England

RAF Chailey
- Chailey, East Sussex in England

Site information
- Type: RAF advanced landing ground
- Code: AJ
- Owner: Air Ministry
- Operator: Royal Air Force
- Controlled by: RAF Second Tactical Air Force * No. 84 Group RAF; RAF Fighter Command; No. 11 Group RAF

Location
- Shown within East Sussex RAF Chailey (the United Kingdom)
- Coordinates: 50°57′19″N 000°03′20″W

Site history
- Built: 1943
- Built by: RAF Airfield Construction Service
- In use: June 1943 - January 1945
- Battles/wars: European theatre of World War II

Airfield information
- Elevation: 32 metres (105 ft) AMSL
Runways
Direction	Length and surface
00/00	Sommerfeld Tracking
00/00	Sommerfeld Tracking

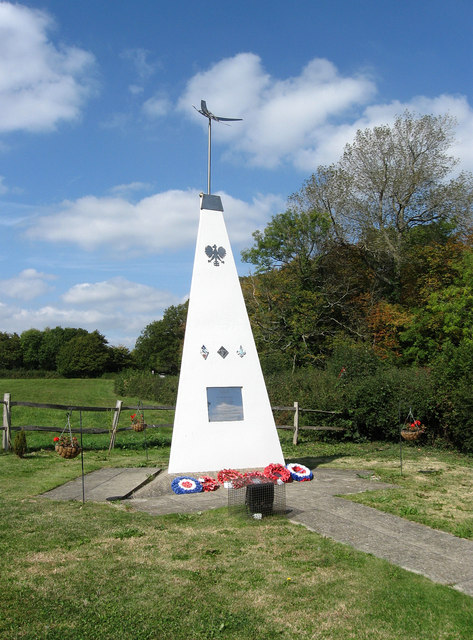
RAF Chailey memorial at the Plough public house, Plumpton

Royal Air Force Chailey or more simply RAF Chailey is a former Royal Air Force advanced landing ground close to the village of Chailey near Burgess Hill in East Sussex during the Second World War. It was an example of an Advanced Landing Ground (ALG), a type of simple, temporary airfield designed to support the invasion of continental Europe.

== History ==
The airfield was on the site of Bower Farm, and was surveyed and commenced in 1942 by Fighter Command with the intention of creating a fighter station as part of the expansion following the Battle of Britain. It was not laid out until 1943, by which time the strategy was different and it was passed to the RAF Second Tactical Air Force to become an operating station for the invasion of continental Europe, codenamed Operation Overlord.

In order to construct the airfield, the RAF demolished the local pub, 'The Plough', which was at the end of the runway, and reconstructed it about half a mile away near Plumpton, and this is now the site of the RAF Chailey memorial.

RAF Chailey hosted No. 131 Airfield Headquarters RAF which became No. 131 (Polish) Wing, with three squadrons: 302, 308 and 317.)

The station's officer commanding was the highest ranking Pole in the RAF, Group Captain Aleksander Gabszewicz.

The airfield was also host to No. 1312 Mobile Wing RAF Regiment and No. 2882 Squadron RAF Regiment

The airfield was de-requisitioned in 1945 and returned to farm use.
