= Coir =

Natural fiber

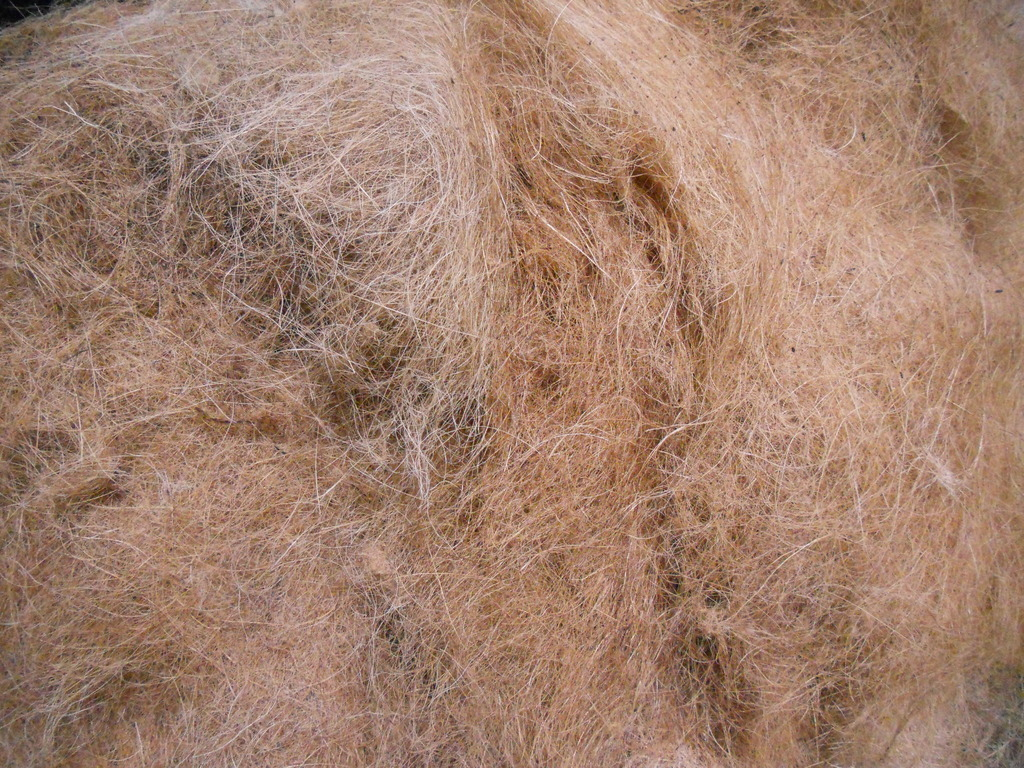
A close-up view of coir fibre

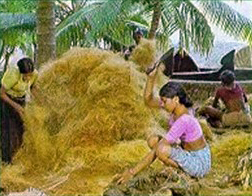
Segregation of coir fibre

Coir (/ˈkɔɪər/), also called coconut fibre, is a plant fibre extracted from the outer husk of coconut, used in products such as floor mats, doormats, brushes, and mattresses, as well as horticulturally in potting mixes and soil amendments. In some countries it is locally called coprah (not to be confused with copra, a dry coconut meat). Coir is the fibrous material found between the hard, internal shell and the outer coat of a coconut. Brown coir, made from ripe coconut, is further used in upholstery padding, sacking, and horticulture, and white coir, from unripe coconut, for making finer brushes, string, rope, and fishing nets. Coir will float in water, so can be used in long lengths in deep water without adding weight that might drag down boats and buoys.

Coir must not be confused with coir pith, which is the powdery, spongy material resulting from the processing of the coir fibre. Pith is chemically similar to coir, but contains much shorter fibers. The name coco peat may refer either to coir or the pith or a mixture, as both have good water-retaining properties as a substitute for peat.

== History ==
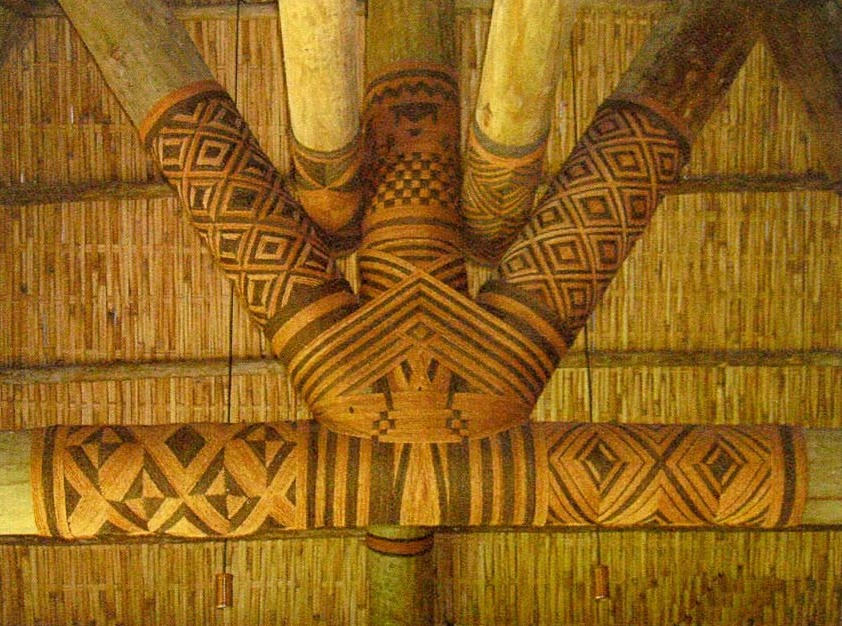
Sennit made from plaited coconut fibre on a traditional house in Fiji

The name coir originally comes from the Malayalam word കയർ (kayar), for cord or rope (traditionally, a kind of rope is made from the coconut fibre). Ropes and cordage have been made from coconut fibre since ancient times. The Austronesian peoples, who first domesticated coconuts, used coconut fibre extensively for ropes and sennit in building houses and lashed-lug plank boats in their voyages in both the Pacific and the Indian Oceans. Polynesians themselves grew a special type of coconut called the niu kafa which yields a lot more fibre per fruit than types grown for human consumption (niu vai, for their water).

Later Indian and Arab navigators who sailed the seas to Malaya, China, and the Persian Gulf centuries ago also used coir for their ship ropes. Arab writers of the 11th century AD referred to the extensive use of coir for ship ropes and rigging.

A coir industry in the UK was recorded before the second half of the 19th century. During 1840, Captain Widely, in co-operation with Captain Logan and Thomas Treloar, founded the known carpet firms of Treloar and Sons in Ludgate Hill, England, for the manufacture of coir into various fabrics suitable for floor coverings.

== Structure ==
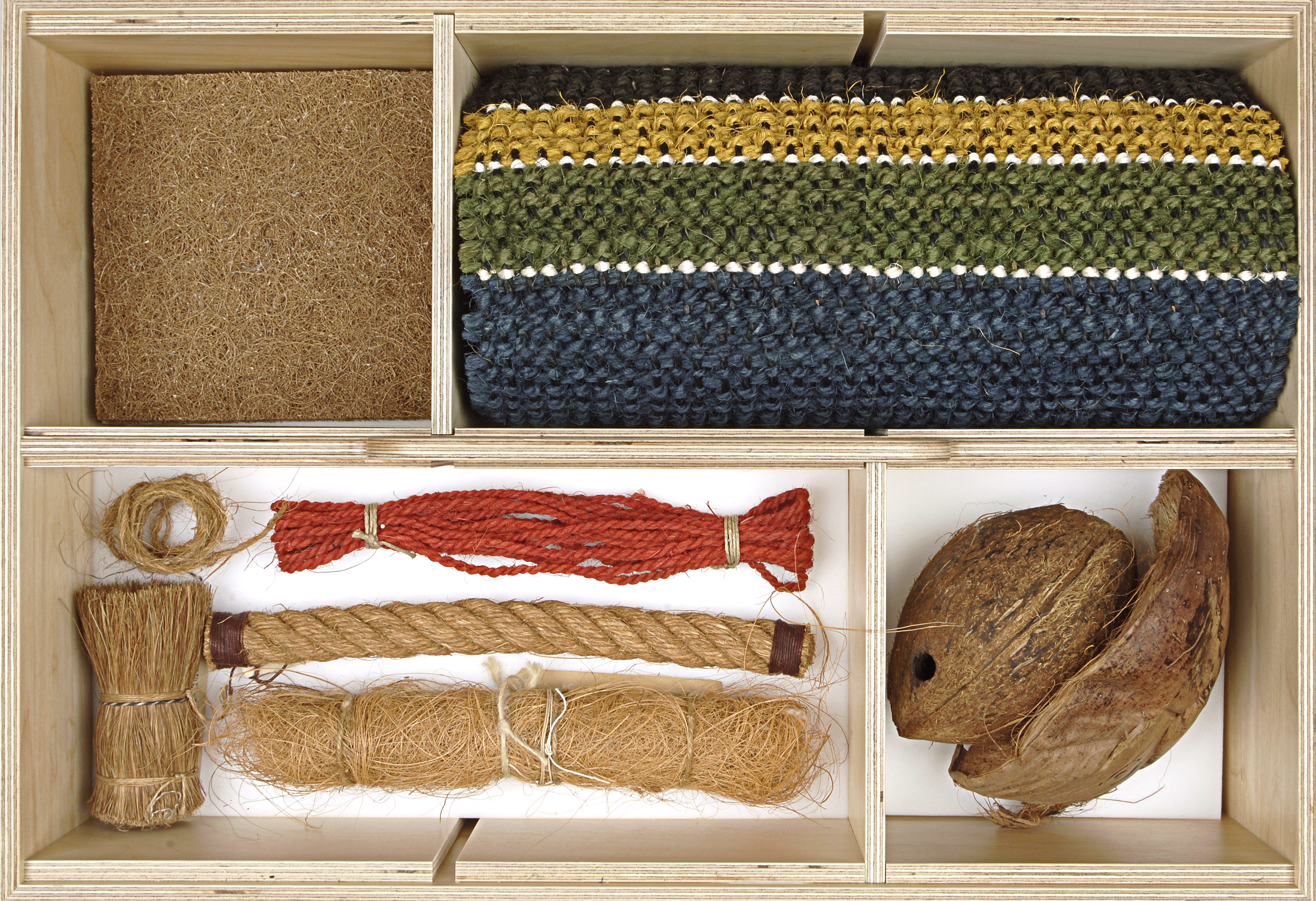
Various forms in which coir fibre can appear

Coir fibres are found between the hard, internal shell and the outer coat of a coconut. The individual fibre cells are narrow and hollow, with thick walls made of cellulose. They are pale when immature, but later become hardened and yellowed as a layer of lignin is deposited on their walls.

Each cell is about 1 mm (0.04 in) long and 10 to 20 μm (0.0004 to 0.0008 in) in diameter. Fibres are typically 10 to 30 centimetres (4 to 12 in) long. The two varieties of coir are brown and white. Brown coir harvested from fully ripened coconuts is thick, strong and has high abrasion resistance. It is typically used in mats, brushes and sacking. Mature brown coir fibres contain more lignin and less cellulose than fibres such as flax and cotton, so are stronger but less flexible. White coir fibres harvested from coconuts before they are ripe are white or light brown in color and are smoother and finer, but also weaker. They are generally spun to make yarn used in mats or rope.

The coir fibre is relatively waterproof, and is one of the few natural fibres resistant to damage by saltwater. Fresh water is used to process brown coir, while seawater and fresh water are both used in the production of white coir.

== Processing ==
Green coconuts, harvested after about six to 12 months on the palm, contain pliable white fibres. Brown fibre is instead obtained by harvesting fully mature coconuts when the nutritious layer surrounding the seed is ready to be processed into copra and desiccated coconut. The fibrous layer of the fruit is then separated from the hard shell (manually) by driving the fruit down onto a spike to split it (dehusking). A well-seasoned husker can manually separate 2,000 coconuts per day. Machines are now available which crush the whole fruit to give the loose fibres. These machines can process up to 2,000 coconuts per hour.

=== Brown fibre ===
The fibrous husks are soaked in pits or in nets in a slow-moving body of water to swell and soften the fibres. The long bristle fibres are separated from the shorter mattress fibres underneath the skin of the nut, a process known as wet-milling.

The mattress fibres are sifted to remove dirt and other rubbish, dried in the sun and packed into bales. Some mattress fibre is allowed to retain more moisture so it retains its elasticity for twisted fibre production. The coir fibre is elastic enough to twist without breaking and it holds a curl as though permanently waved. Twisting is done by simply making a rope of the hank of fibre and twisting it using a machine or by hand.

The longer bristle fibre is washed in clean water and then dried before being tied into bundles or hanks. It may then be cleaned and 'hackled' by steel combs to straighten the fibres and remove any shorter fibre pieces. Coir bristle fibre can also be bleached and dyed to obtain hanks of different colours.

=== White fibre ===
The immature husks are suspended in a river or water-filled pit for up to ten months. During this time, micro-organisms break down the plant tissues surrounding the fibres to loosen them — a process known as retting. The segments of the husk are then beaten with iron rods to separate out the long fibres which are subsequently dried and cleaned. Cleaned fibre is ready for spinning into yarn using a simple one-handed system or a spinning wheel.

In 2009, researchers at CSIR's National Institute for Interdisciplinary Science and Technology in Thiruvananthapuram developed a biological process for the extraction of coir fibre from coconut husk without polluting the environment. The technology uses enzymes to separate the fibres by converting and solubilizing plant compounds to curb the pollution of waters caused by retting of husks.

=== Buffering ===
Because coir pith is high in sodium and potassium, it is treated before use as a growth medium for plants or fungi by soaking in a calcium buffering solution; most coir sold for growing purposes is said to be pre-treated. Once any remaining salts have been leached out of the coir pith, it and the cocochips become suitable substrates for cultivating fungi. Coir is naturally rich in potassium, which can lead to magnesium and calcium deficiencies in soilless horticultural media. Coir fiber is rarely used as a potting material, except for orchids, and does not need buffering, as it has a very low cation-exchange capacity (CEC) capacity, hence not retaining salts.

Coir does provide a suitable substrate for horticultural use as a soilless potting medium. The material's high lignin content is longer-lasting, holds more water, and does not shrink off the sides of the pot when dry allowing for easier rewetting. This light media has advantages and disadvantages that can be corrected with the addition of the proper amendment such as coarse sand for weight in interior plants like Draceana. Nutritive amendments should also be considered. Calcium and magnesium will be lacking in coir potting mixes, so a naturally good source of these nutrients is dolomitic lime which contains both. pH is of utmost importance as coir pith tends to have a high pH after some months of use, resulting in plant stunting and multiple deficiencies. Coir also has the disadvantage of being extremely sensitive to the Leucocoprinus greenhouse fungus. The addition of beneficial microbes to the coir media have been successful in tropical green house conditions and interior spaces as well. The fungi engage in growth and reproduction under moist atmospheres producing fruiting bodies (mushrooms).

=== Bristle coir ===
Bristle coir is the longest variety of coir fibre. It is manufactured from retted coconut husks through a process called defibering. The coir fibre thus extracted is then combed using steel combs to make the fibre clean and to remove short fibres. Bristle coir fibre is used as bristles in brushes for domestic and industrial applications.

== Uses ==
=== Cordage, packaging, bedding, flooring, and others ===
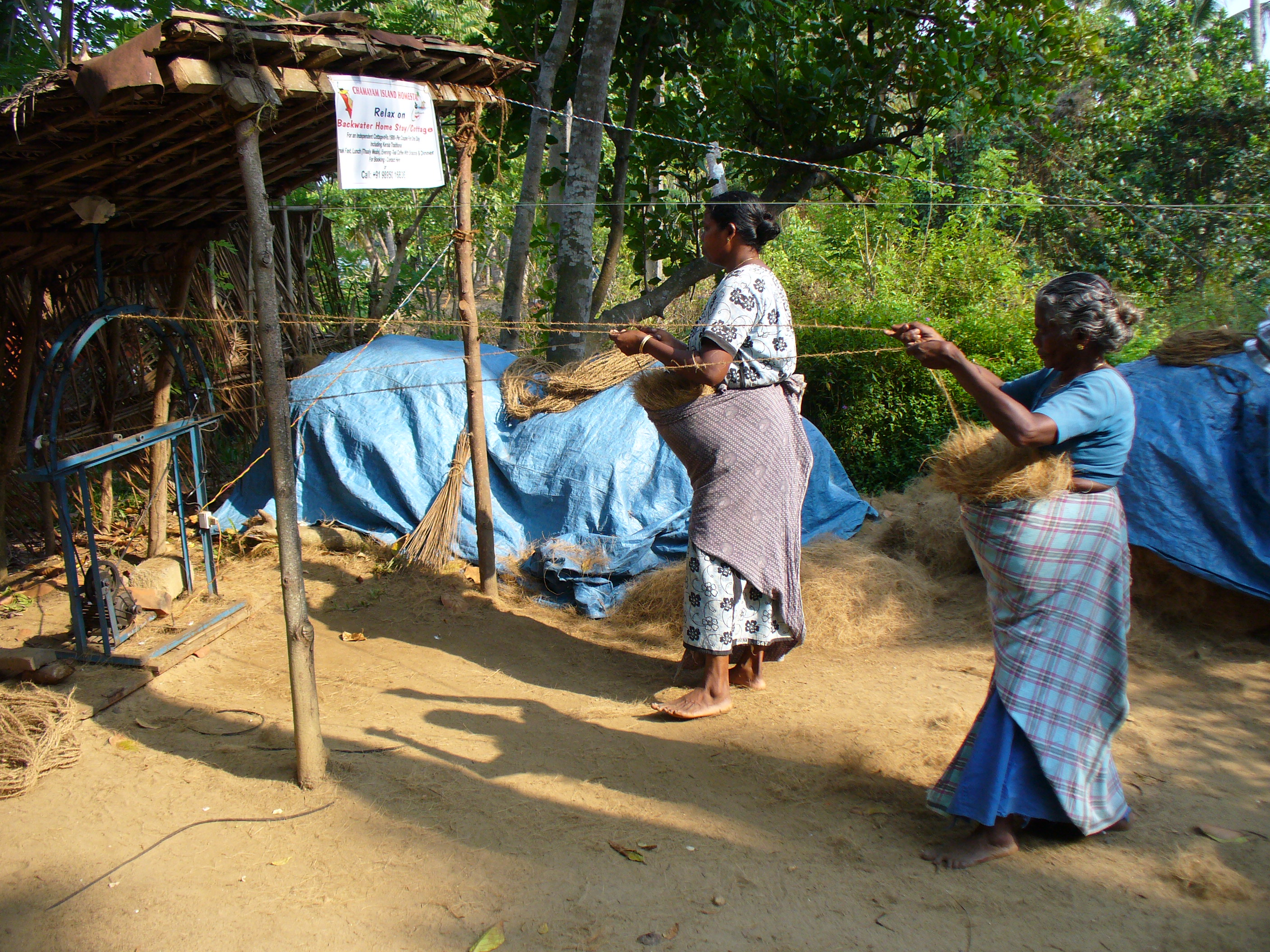
Making coir rope in Kerala, India

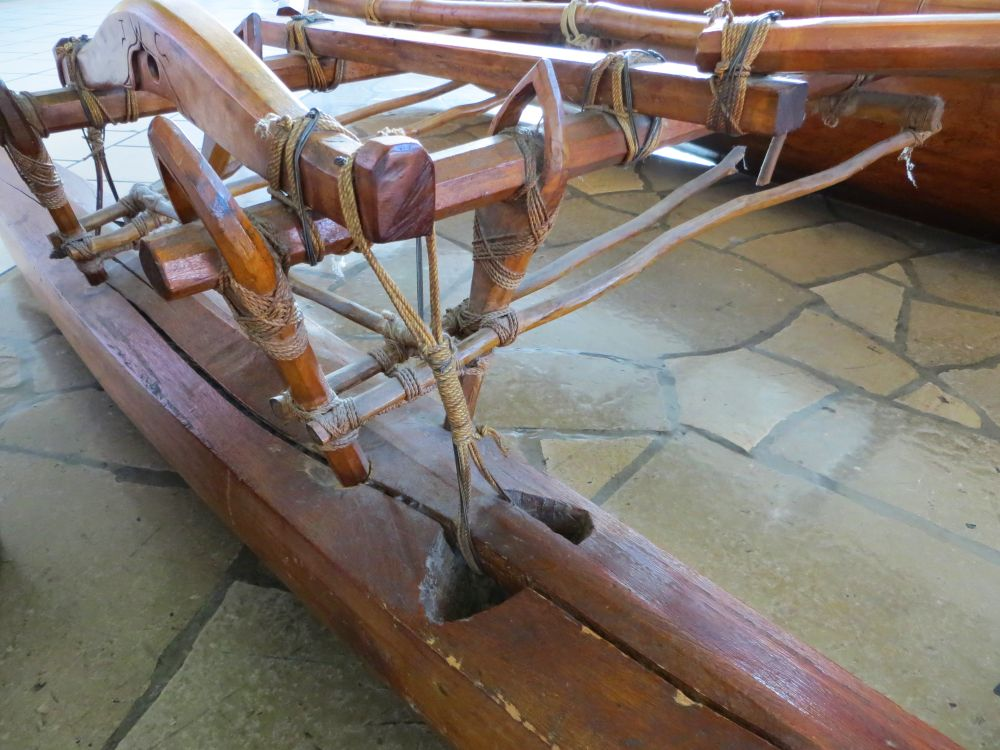
An outrigger canoe from Sonsorol, Palau. All parts of the canoe are connected by thin coir ropes.

Red coir is used in floor mats and doormats, brushes, mattresses, floor tiles and sacking. A small amount is also made into twine. Pads of curled brown coir fibre, made by needle-felting (a machine technique that mats the fibres together), are shaped and cut to fill mattresses and for use in erosion control on river banks and hillsides. A major proportion of brown coir pads are sprayed with rubber latex which bonds the fibres together (rubberised coir) to be used as upholstery padding for the automobile industry in Europe. The material is also used for packaging.

The major use of white coir is in rope manufacture. Mats of woven coir fibre are made from the finer grades of bristle and white fibre using hand or mechanical looms. White coir also is used to make fishing nets due to its strong resistance to saltwater.

=== Agricultural and horticultural uses ===
In agriculture and horticulture, coir is used as an organic and decorative component in soil and potting mixes. Out of increasing concern regarding the sustainability of producing sphagnum (peat moss) and peat from peatlands, usage of alternative substrates has been on the rise; the plantation byproduct coir is one commonly used substitute. Many sources of coir, however, are heavily contaminated with pathogenic fungi, and the choice of the source is important. Coir is also useful to deter snails from delicate plantings, as a growing medium in intensive glasshouse (greenhouse) horticulture, and as an inert substrate in some hydroponic growing systems.

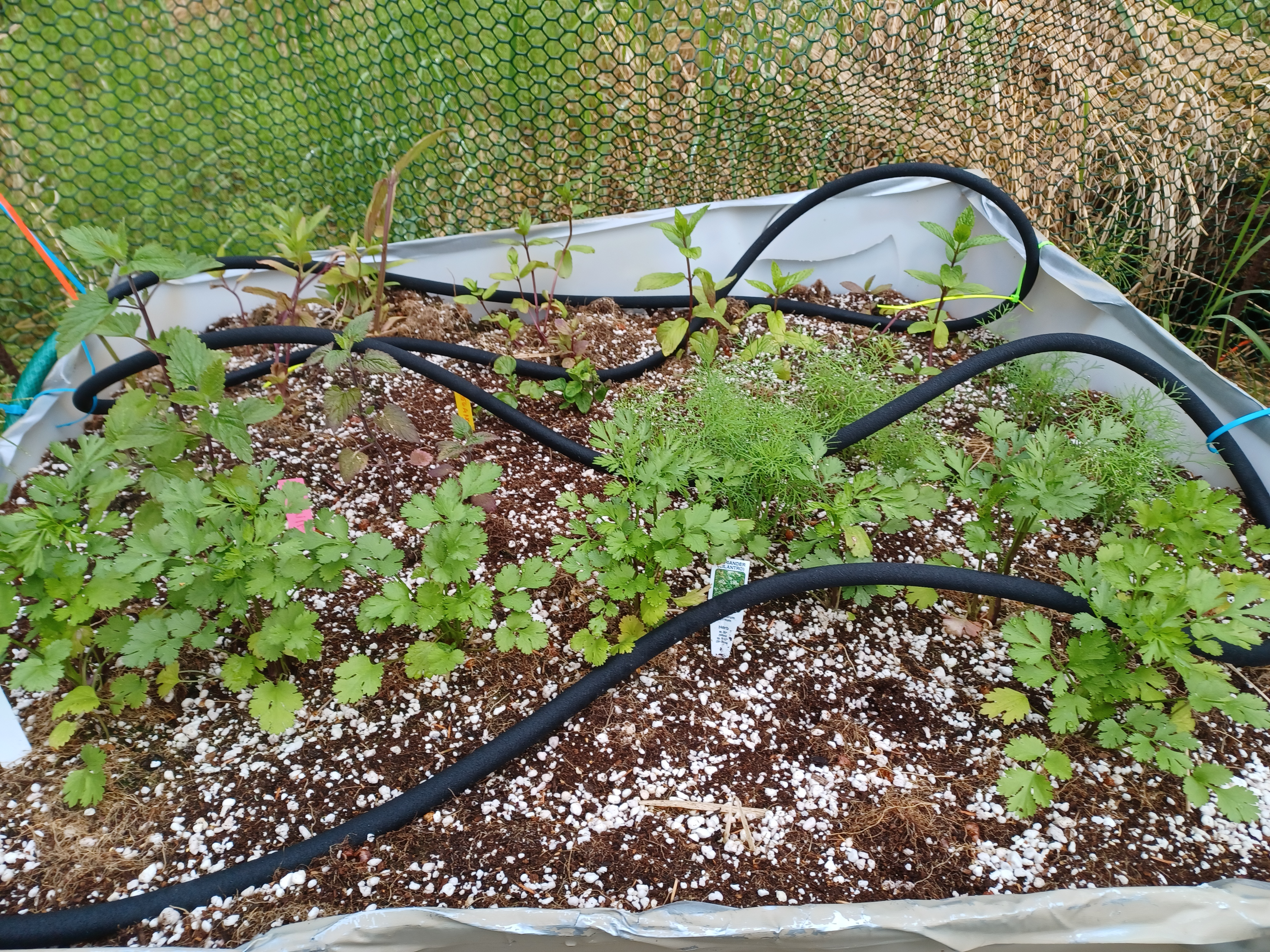
A small herb garden employing coir mixed with perlite. The soaking hose provides water and some nutrients.

Coir is also used as a substrate to grow mushrooms. The coir is usually mixed with vermiculite and pasteurised with boiling water. After the coir/vermiculite mix has cooled to room temperature, it is placed in a larger container, usually a plastic box. Previously prepared spawn jars, usually grown using substrates such as rye grains or wild bird seed, are then added. This spawn is the mushroom's mycelium and will colonize the coir/vermiculite mix, eventually fruiting mushrooms.

Coir fibre pith or coir dust can hold large quantities of water, just like a sponge. It is used as a replacement for traditional peat in soil mixtures, or, as a soil-less substrate for plant cultivation. It has been called "coco peat" because it is to fresh coco fibre somewhat like peat to peat moss, although it is not true peat.

Coir waste from coir fibre industries is washed, heat-treated, screened and graded before being processed into coco peat products of various granularity and denseness, which are then used for horticultural and agricultural applications and as industrial absorbent.

Usually shipped in the form of compressed bales, briquettes, slabs or discs, the end user usually expands and aerates the compressed coco peat by the addition of water. A single kilogramme of dry coco peat will expand to 15 litres of moist coco peat.

Coco peat is used as a soil conditioner. Due to low levels of nutrients in its composition, coco peat is usually not the sole component in the medium used to grow plants. When plants are grown exclusively in coco peat, it is important to add nutrients according to the specific plants' needs. Coco peat from Philippines, Sri Lanka and India contains several macro- and micro-plant nutrients, including substantial quantities of potassium. This extra potassium can interfere with magnesium availability. Adding extra magnesium through the addition of magnesium sulphates can correct this issue.

Some coco peat is not fully decomposed when it arrives and will use up available nitrogen as it does so (known as drawdown), competing with the plant if there is not enough. This is called nitrogen robbery; it can cause nitrogen deficiency in the plants. Poorly sourced coco fibre can have excess salts in it and needs washing (check electrical conductivity of run-off water, flush if high). It holds water well and holds around 1,000 times more air than soil. Adding slow release fertilizers or organic fertilizers are highly advised when growing with coco fibre.

Common uses of coco fibre include:

- As a substitute for peat, because it is free of bacteria and most fungal spores, and is sustainably produced without the environmental damage caused by peat mining.
- Mixed with sand, compost and fertilizer to make good quality potting soil. Coco peat generally has an acidity in the range of pH - 5.5 to 6.5, which is slightly too acidic for some plants, but many popular plants can tolerate this pH range.
- As substrate for growing mushrooms, which thrive on the cellulose. Coco peat has high cellulose and lignin content.

Coco fibre can be re-used up to three times with little loss of yield. Coco fibre from diseased plants should not be re-used unless sterilization is thorough.

=== Other uses ===
==== Oil and fluid absorption ====
Due to its superior absorption capabilities when compared to products made of clay, silica and diatomaceous earth-based absorbents, dry coconut coir pith is gaining popularity as an oil and fluid absorbent. Many other absorbents have to be mined, whereas coconut coir pith is a waste product in abundance in countries where coconut is a major agriculture product.

In the 2024 Manila Bay oil spill, the DILG Bataan appealed for hay, hair and coconut coir pith (husk) to process into oil booms as absorbent for the Philippine Coast Guard's cleanup operations.

==== Animal bedding ====
Coconut coir pith is also used as a bedding in litter boxes, animal farms and pet houses to absorb animal waste. It can further be used as a terrarium substrate for reptiles or arachnids.

==== Construction material ====
Coconut fiber (coir) is used as a construction material because the natural fibers are eco-friendly. Additionally, coconut fiber (CF) has low thermal conductivity, is very tough, ductile, durable, renewable and inexpensive. It was observed in an experimental study that by partially replacing 2% of cement with CF, the compressive strength of the concrete is increased.

==== Biocontrol ====
Trichoderma coir pith cake (TCPC) has been prepared and successfully used for control of plant diseases. The dry product TCPC has a long shelf life.

== Safety ==
Coir is an allergen, as also are the latex and other materials used frequently to treat coir.

=== Biosecurity risks ===
Coco fibre can harbor organisms that pose a threat to the biosecurity of countries into which it is imported. Coco peat has been imported into New Zealand since about 1989 with a marked increase since 2004. By 2009 a total of 25 new weed species had been found in imported coco peat. The regulations relating to importing coco peat into New Zealand have been amended to improve the biosecurity measures.

On the other hand, coir can also contain beneficial life-forms. Coconut coir from Mexico has been found to contain large numbers of colonies of the beneficial fungus Aspergillus terreus, which acts as a biological control against plant pathogenic fungi. Trichoderma is a naturally occurring fungus in coco peat; it works in symbiosis with plant roots to protect them from pathogenic fungi such as Pythium.

Coco peat may be sterilized to remove potential pathogens and weeds along with beneficial life. This may be done to remove contaminants in fresh material or to reuse old coir. Both heat (boiling or baking) and chemical means can be used.

== Major producers ==
Coir production, 2020
| Country | Weight (tonnes) |
|---|---|
| India | 586,686 |
| Vietnam | 390,541 |
| Sri Lanka | 161,791 |
| Thailand | 64,098 |
| Ghana | 39,548 |
| All others | 33,960 |
| World | 1,276,624 |

Total world coir fibre production is 1,276,624 tonnes (1,256,462 long tons; 1,407,237 short tons). Kerala, a state in the coastal region of India, produces 60% of the total supply of white coir fibre in the world. Sri Lanka produces 36% of the total brown fibre output. Over 50% of the coir fibre produced annually throughout the world is consumed in the countries of origin, mainly India. Together, India and Sri Lanka produced 59% of the coir produced in 2020. Sri Lanka remains the world's largest exporter of coir fibre and coir fibre based products.

== See also ==
- Coconut production in Kerala
- Coir Board of India
- Rope
- International Coir Museum
- International Year of Natural Fibres 2009
