= Sommerfeld tracking =

Prefabricated airfield surface

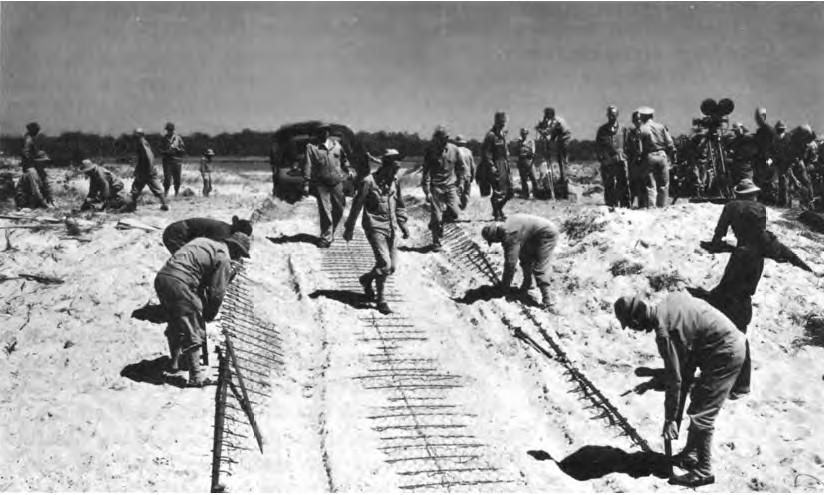
US Army Engineers laying Sommerfield tracking in the sand during a landing exercise at Camp Edwards, Massachusetts, United States, 1942.

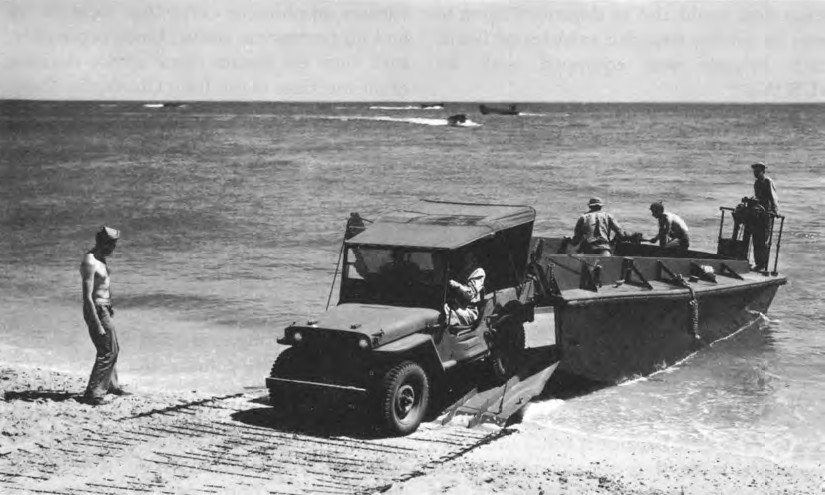
A jeep comes ashore onto Sommerfield tracking during a landing exercise at Camp Edwards, Massachusetts, United States, 1942.

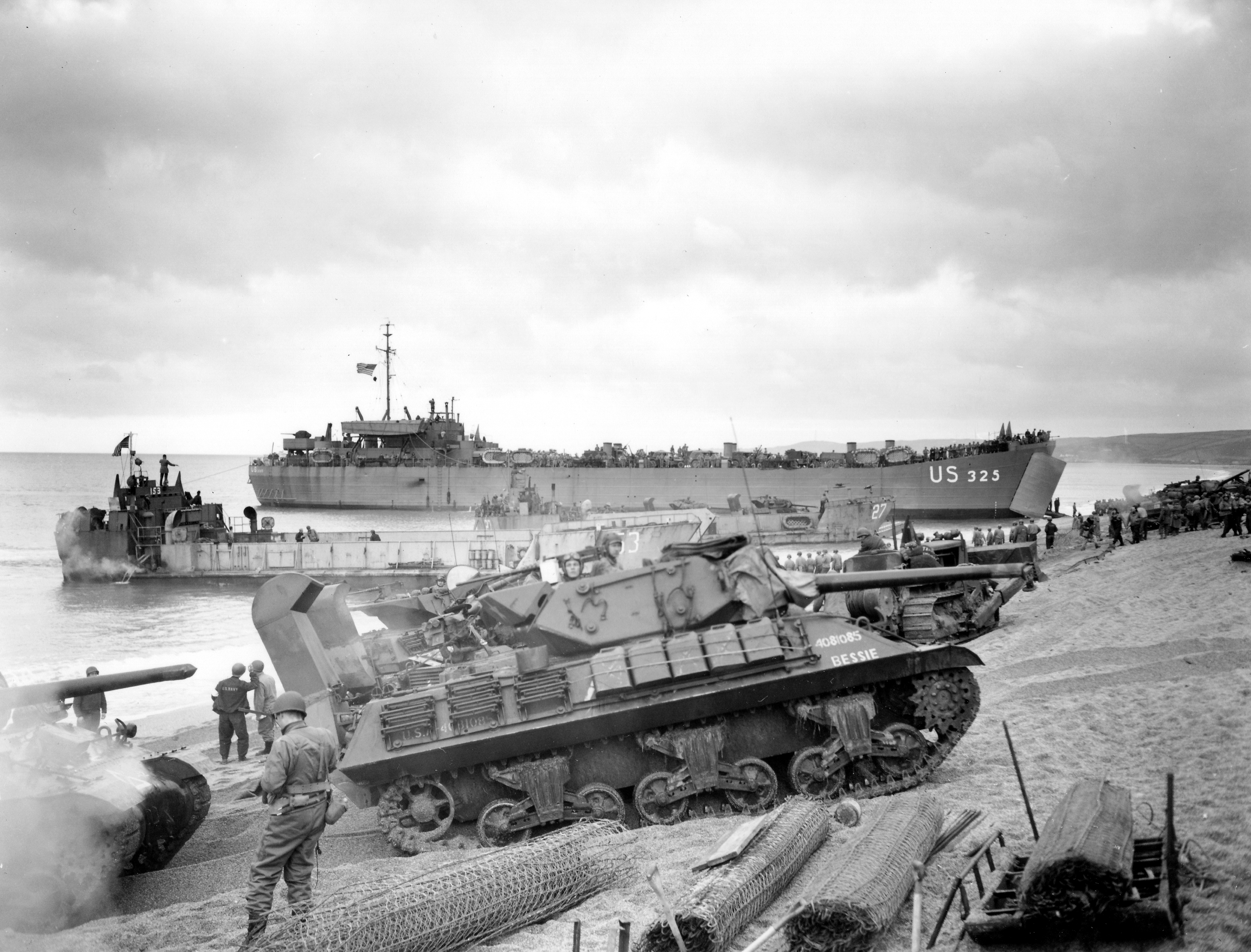
Rolls of Sommerfield tracking can be seen in the foreground during a landing exercise at Slapton Sands, Devon, England, April 1944.

Sommerfeld tracking, named after German expatriate engineer, Kurt Joachim Sommerfeld, then living in Cambridge, England, was a lightweight wire mesh type of prefabricated airfield surface. First put into use by the British in 1941, it consisted of wire netting stiffened laterally by steel rods. This gave it load-carrying capacity while staying flexible enough to be rolled up. Kurt Sommerfeld developed the track in the workshops of D.Mackay engineering based in East Road Cambridge. He worked on the design with Donald Mackay.

Nicknamed "tin lino", Sommerfeld tracking consisted of rolls 3.25 m (10 ft 8 in) wide by 23 m (75 ft 6 in) long. Mild steel rods threaded through at 9 inch intervals gave it strength. The rolls could be joined at the edges by threading flat steel bar through loops in the ends of the rods.

Sommerfeld tracking was used extensively by the Royal Air Force in the Second World War to make runways at their airfields, as it could be deployed quickly. In addition, some 44,500,000 yards of Sommerfeld tracking was supplied to US forces by Britain in Reverse Lend-Lease.

Sommerfeld tracking was used widely on RAF and USAAF Advanced Landing Grounds, both in the UK and elsewhere.

== Use ==
The ground was cleared and, if swampy, a layer of coir (also known as coco peat) or coconut matting laid down. The Sommerfeld tracking was unrolled over the ground, pulled tight by a tractor, bulldozer, or similar vehicle, then fastened to the ground with angle-iron pickets. A typical runway made of Sommerfeld tracking was 3,000 feet (910 m) by 156 feet (48 m).

It would appear that this method did have some limitations and there are various reports of airfields being out of use during heavy rainfall due to mud, and the fact that the tracking would lift off the ground. There are also anecdotal reports of it causing damage to aircraft, such as wheels being torn off.

== See also ==
- Index of aviation articles
- Marston Mat

== Bibliography ==
- "Airfield Roads and Runways", Flight, vol. XLVI, no. 1857, pp. 101–102, 27 July 1944 – via Flightglobal Archive
- "North African Runways", Flight, vol. XLIII, no. 1789, p. 367, 8 April 1943 – via Flightglobal Archive
