= Coconut production in India =

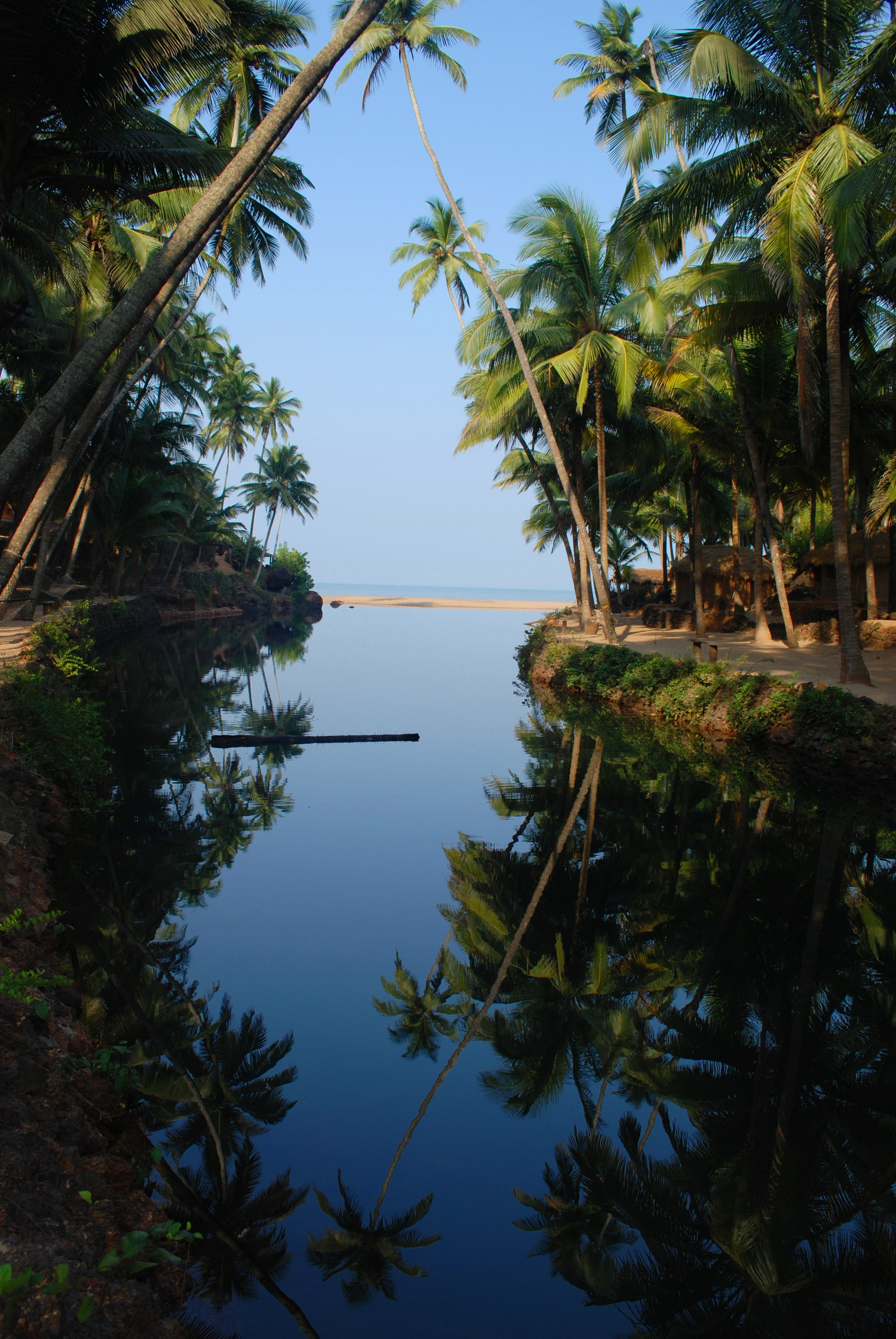
Palm-fringed backwaters of Goa

Coconut production plays an important role in the national economy of India. According to figures published by the Food and Agriculture Organization of the United Nations, India is one of the world's largest producers of coconut, producing 14,707,567 tonnes (14,475,283 long tons) in shell in 2024. In addition to cultivation of the coconut palm, related activities include copra processing, extraction of coconut oil, and manufacturing of coir or coconut fibre.

Traditional areas of coconut cultivation are the Malabar and Coromandel coasts. The states of Kerala, Karnataka, and Tamil Nadu practise large-scale intensive farming of coconut. Andhra Pradesh, Maharashtra, Odisha, West Bengal, Gujarat, Assam, Puducherry, and Goa; and the island territories of Lakshadweep, and Andaman and Nicobar Islands are other areas of coconut production.

== See also ==
- Coconut production in Kerala
- Coconut Development Board
