= Coconut production in Kerala =

Kerala or Keralam (as it is known in the region's Malayalam language) are called ‘alam’ meaning ‘the land of’, and ‘kera’ meaning ‘coconut’. Jammed between the sea and coastal mountains, Kerala is subject to the monsoon rains that flood the land and the rice paddies on the subcontinent's southern tip. Long growing seasons yield a coconut crop every 40 days, with each tree producing 20 to 30 coconuts per harvest. Keralites, most of whom seem to have at least four or five trees on their small plots of land, claim they are Kalpa Vriksham —“the trees of heaven.” They use the coconuts themselves for food, tender coconuts for water and spirituous toddy for drinking; the fronds for mats and roofs; the oil for cooking; and the husk fibre for a thriving rope industry. They are intrinsically tied to the culture and folklore well. It is a part of every celebration —as an ingredient in the Keralan delicacies prepared, as offering to the gods and to mark an auspicious occasion (by breaking a coconut). Various terms like copra and coir are derived from the native Malayalam language.

By the late 1970s it accounted for some 68% of total production in India and at one stage some 8,99,198 hectares were reportedly under cultivation. Today Kerala produces roughly 45% of India's coconuts, with some 92% of total production lying in the southern Indian states and Kerala's neighbours. The Coconut Development Board which plays an important role in the development of coconut production in India has its headquarters in Kochi, Kerala. One problem which poses a major threat to production in Kerala is 'Root Wilt Disease'.

== Places with high cultivation ==
Coastal regions have sandy soils which is the best for coconut trees which results in a higher yield of the produce (fruit). In Kerala Interior places with fertile soils and plain regions also give good growth to coconut trees.

=== Places (List) ===
- Trivandrum
- Kochi
- Kollam
- Alappuzha
- Ponnani
- Tanur
- Kozhikode
- Kannur
- Places in plain fertile regions of Kottayam and Pathanamthitta District.

== Uses ==
In Kerala, the coconut tree is called as "Kalpa Vriksham" which essentially means all parts of a Coconut tree is useful some way or other. Cocus nucifera dominate the landscape in many parts, rising up to a height of 25m, and bearing over 50 fruits on average in a year. The trees have many uses; their leaves are used to make sheds, baskets, and doormats, the husk for making coir, the shell for making ladles and spoons, and fruits used for making hair oil or for eating. Coconut is a staple ingredient in many Kerala dishes and coconut oil is widely consumed and used to make drinks such as coconut toddy and dishes such as appam. Coconut is also used for making coconut paste which is essential for making traditional curries.

A number of places in Kerala such as Thiruvananthapuram, Kochi, Kumarakom, Paravur, Mararikulam and Periyar offer coconut tours to visitors in their plantations, providing an insight into coconut cultivation in Kerala.

== Picture gallery ==
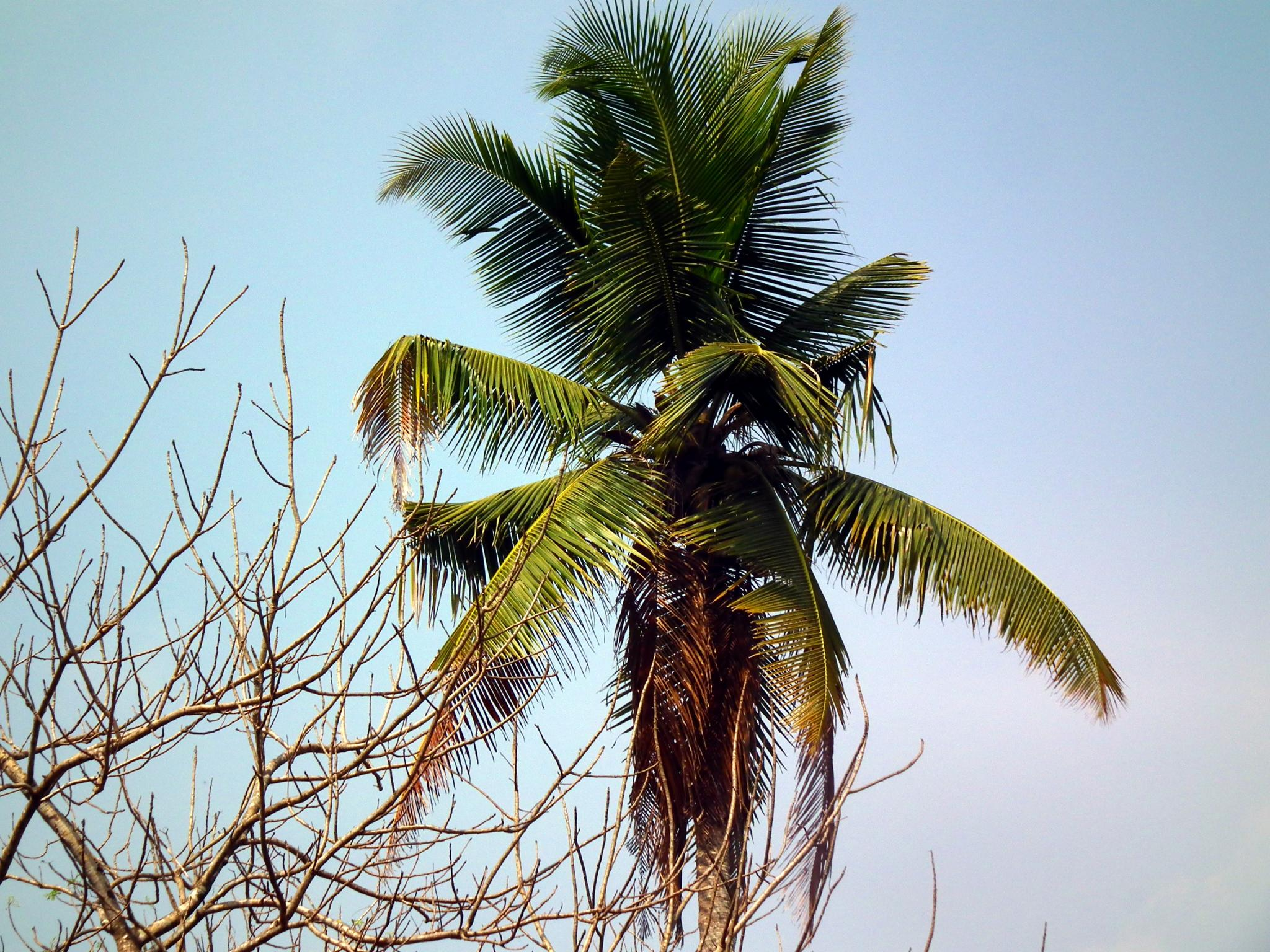
A coconut tree in Kerala

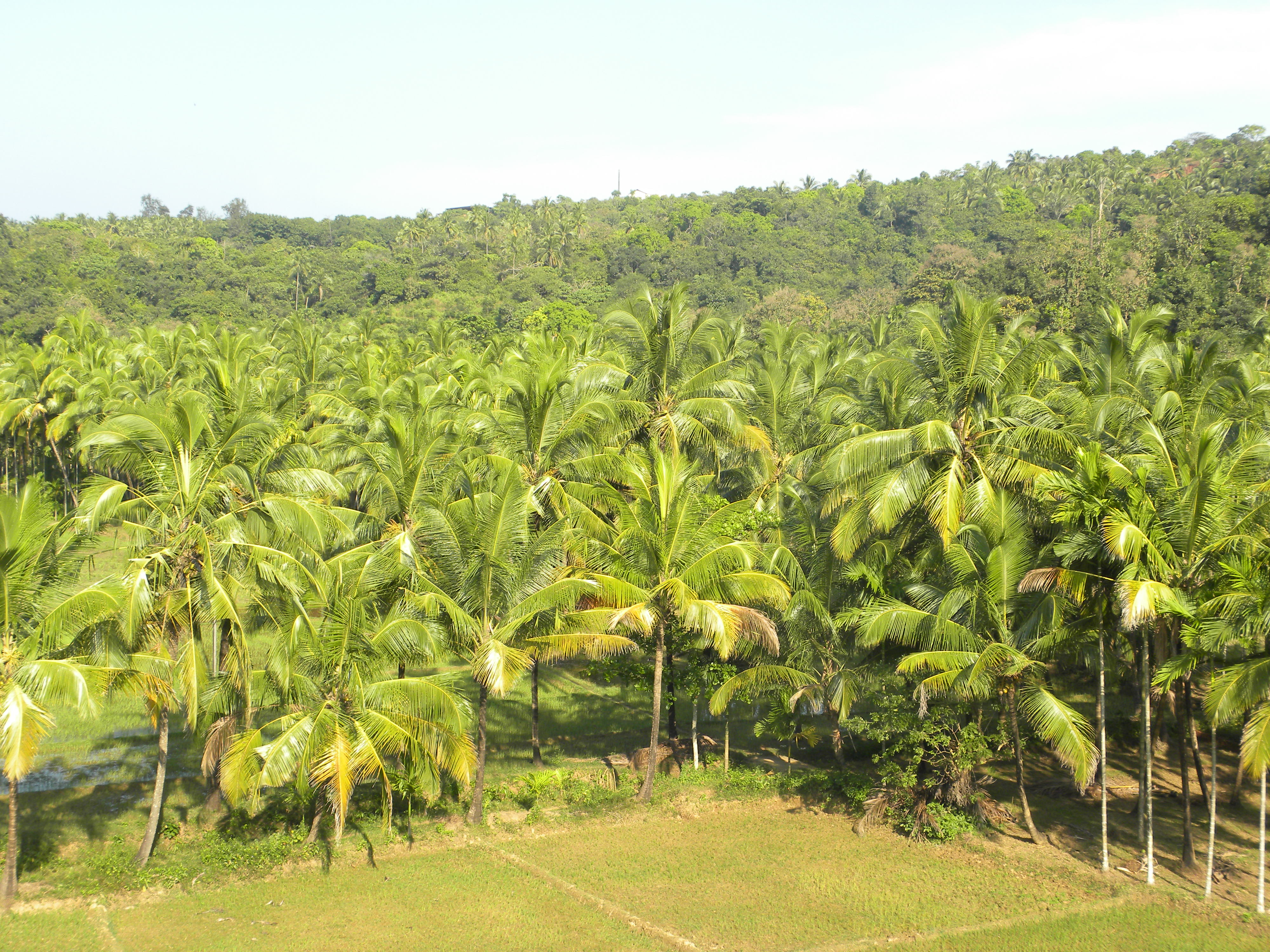
Coconut trees and paddy field

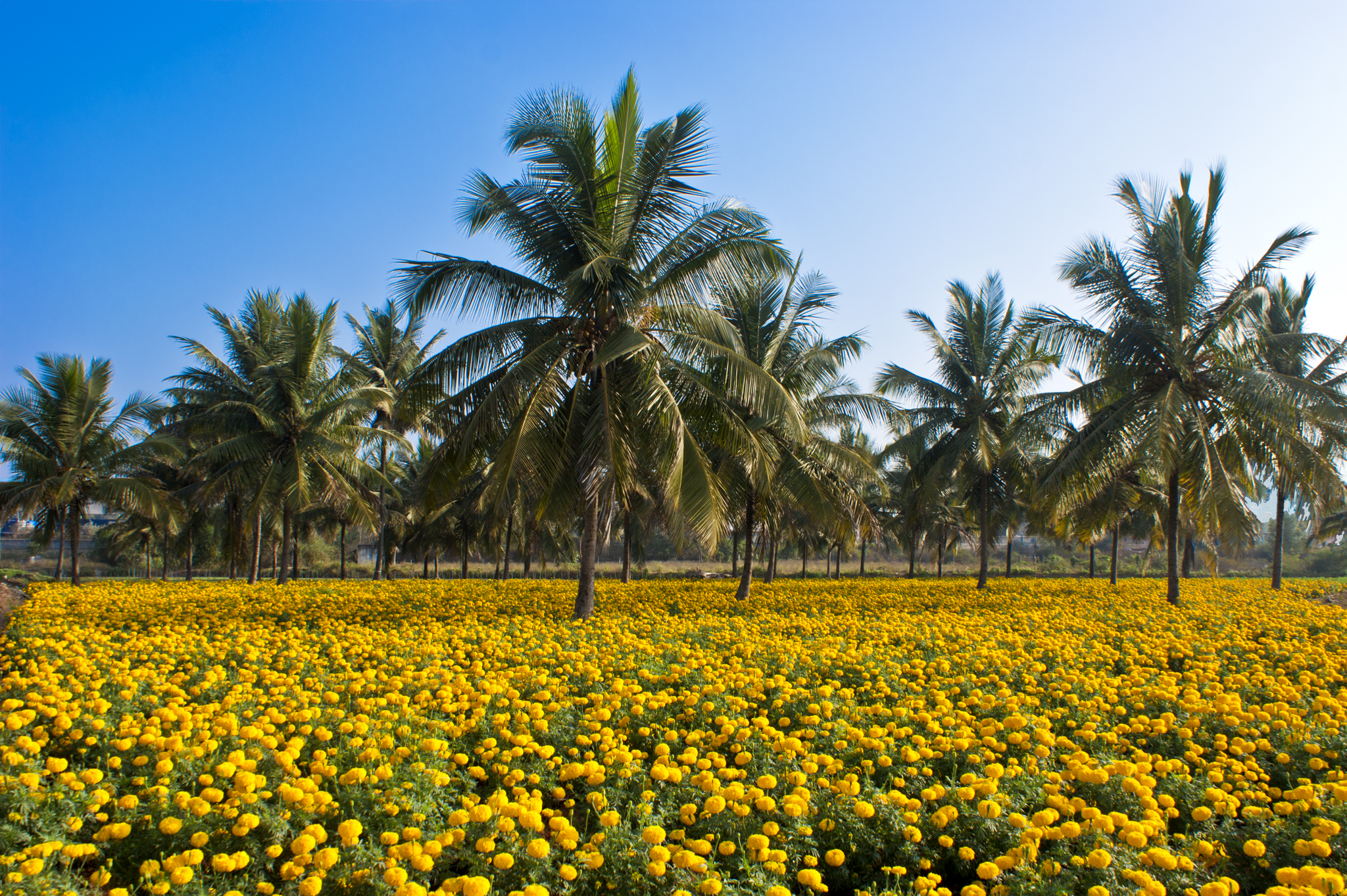
Intercropping coconut with Tagetes erecta

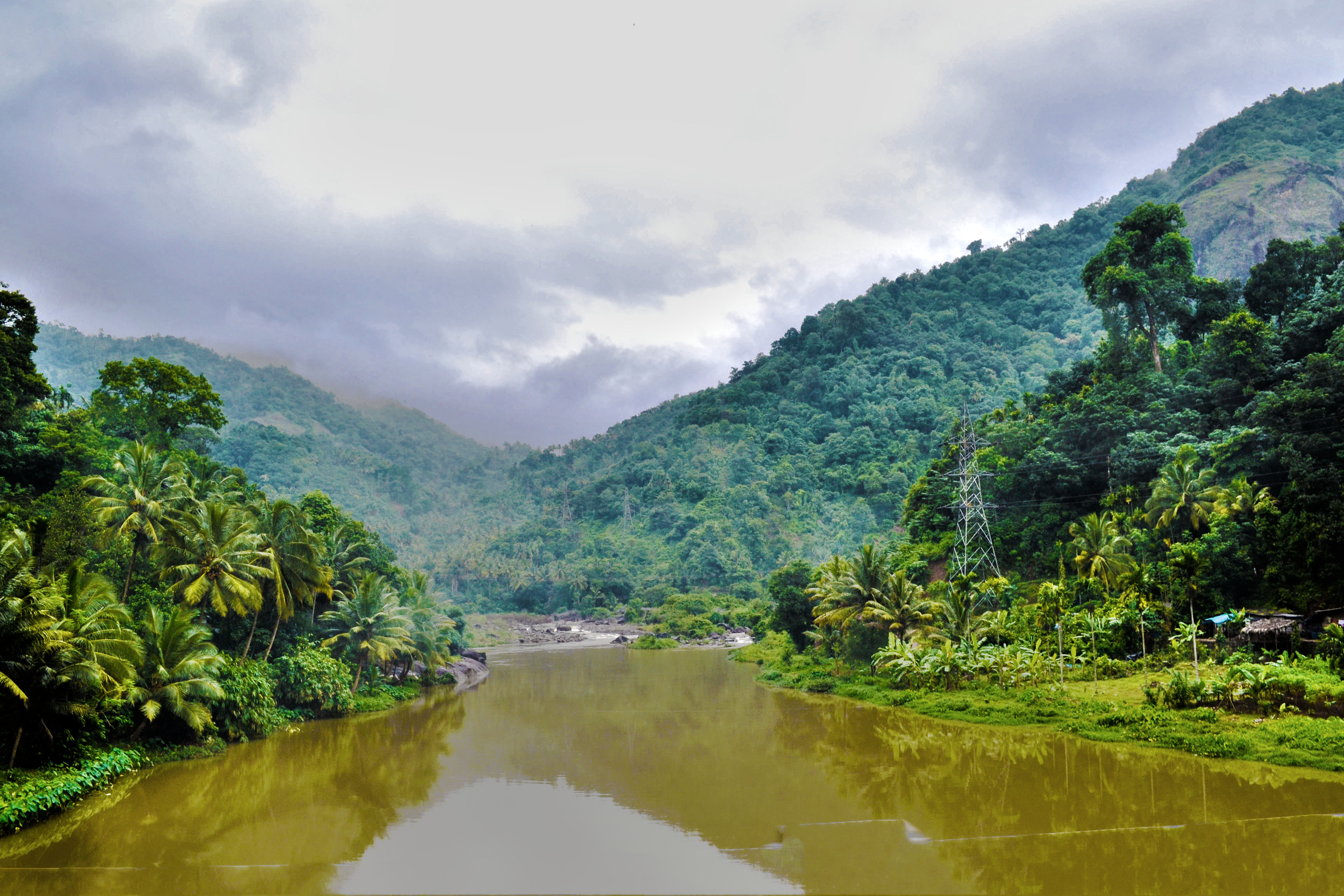
Kallar, Kerala

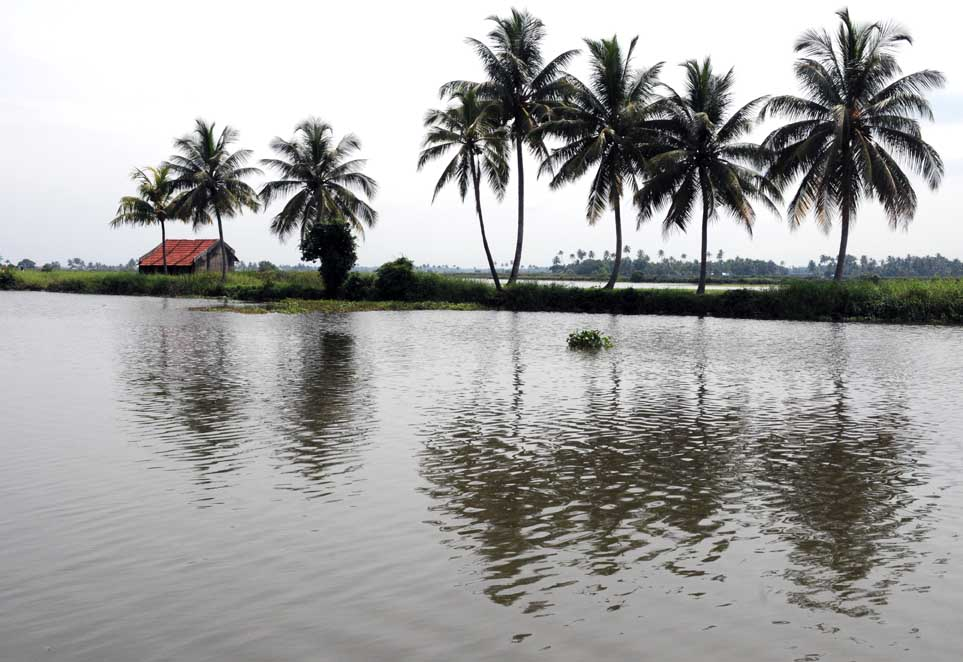
Toddy shop

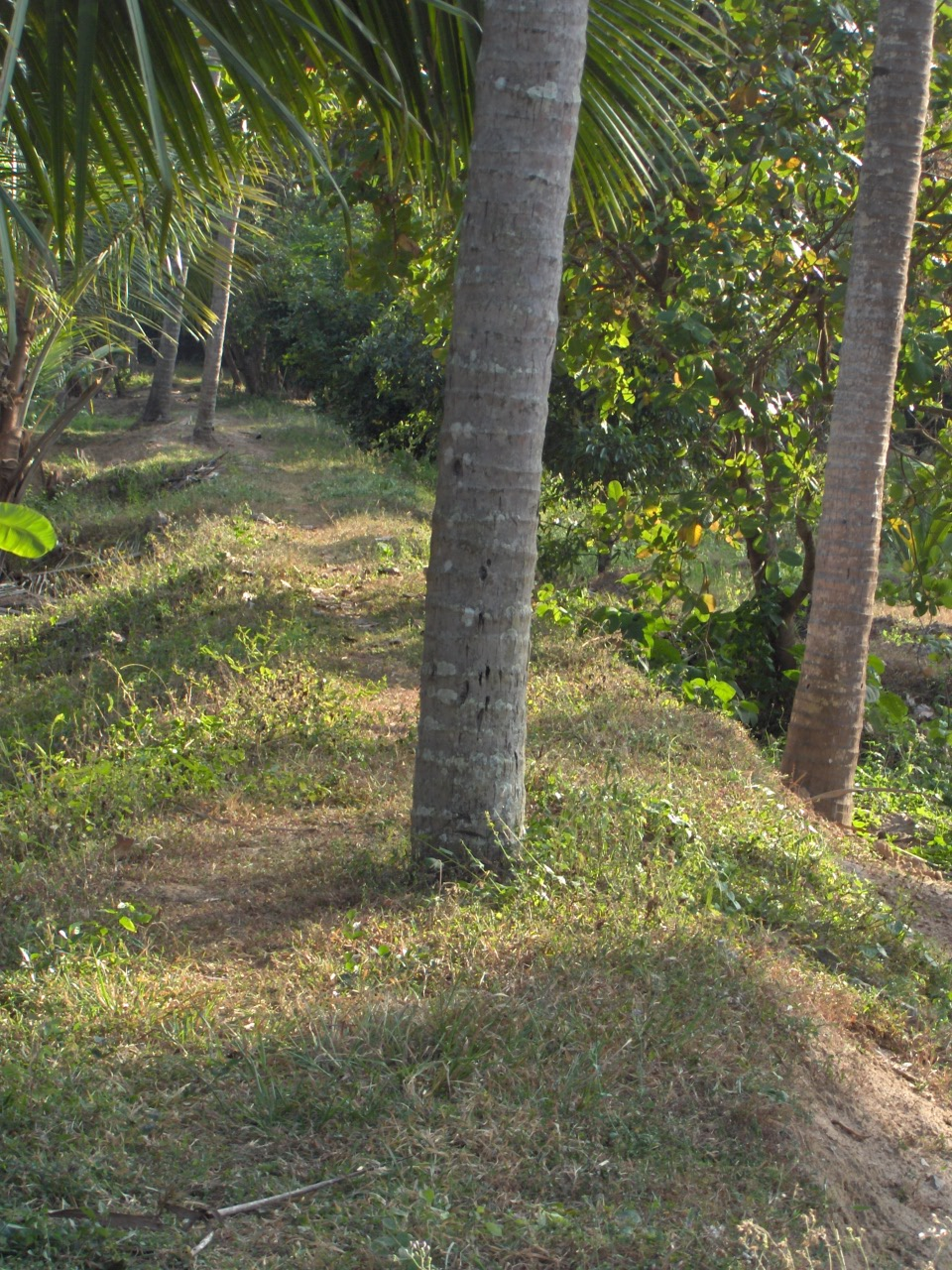
Varambu

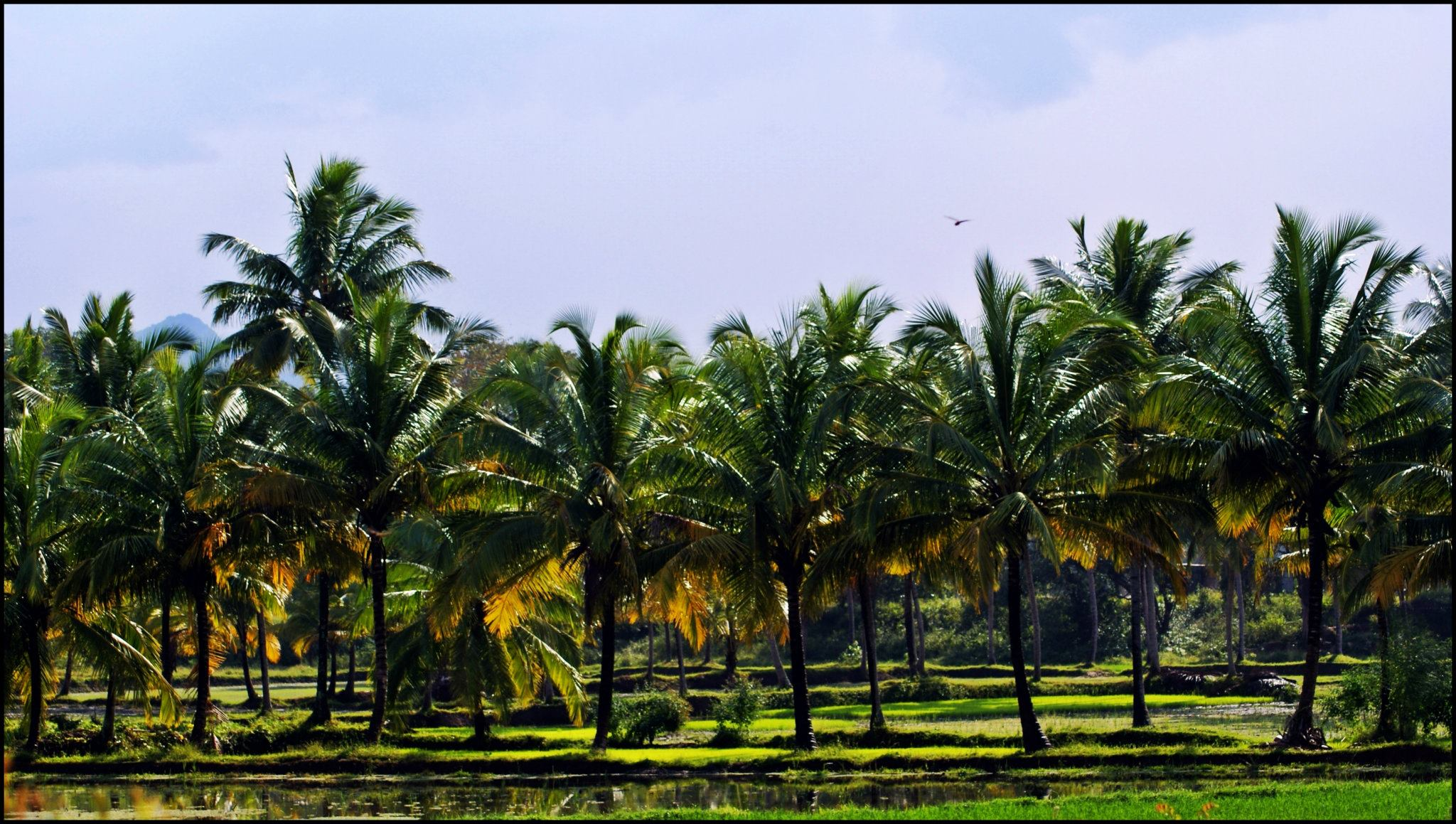
Vadavannur Rice Fields

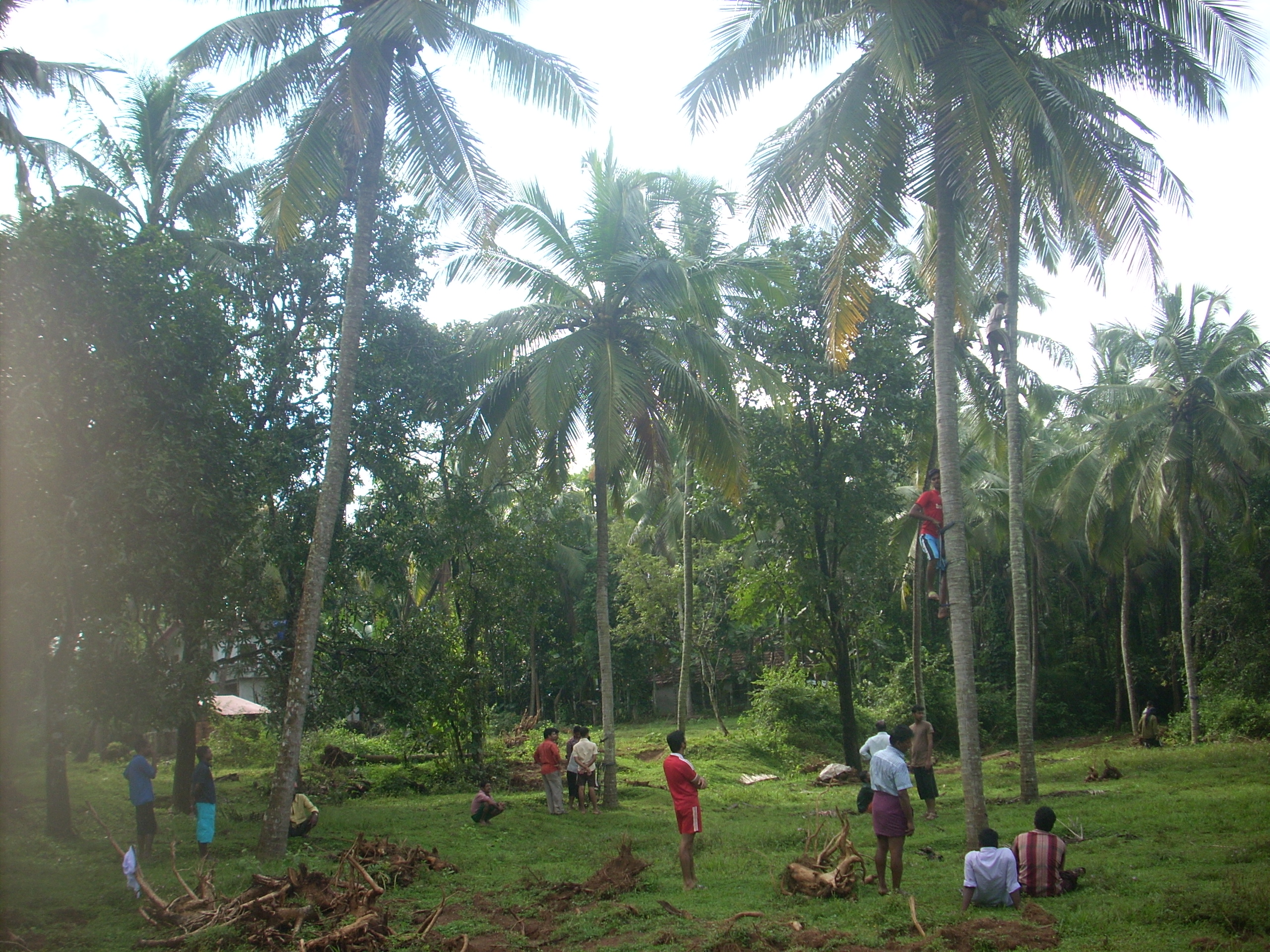
Coconut Tree

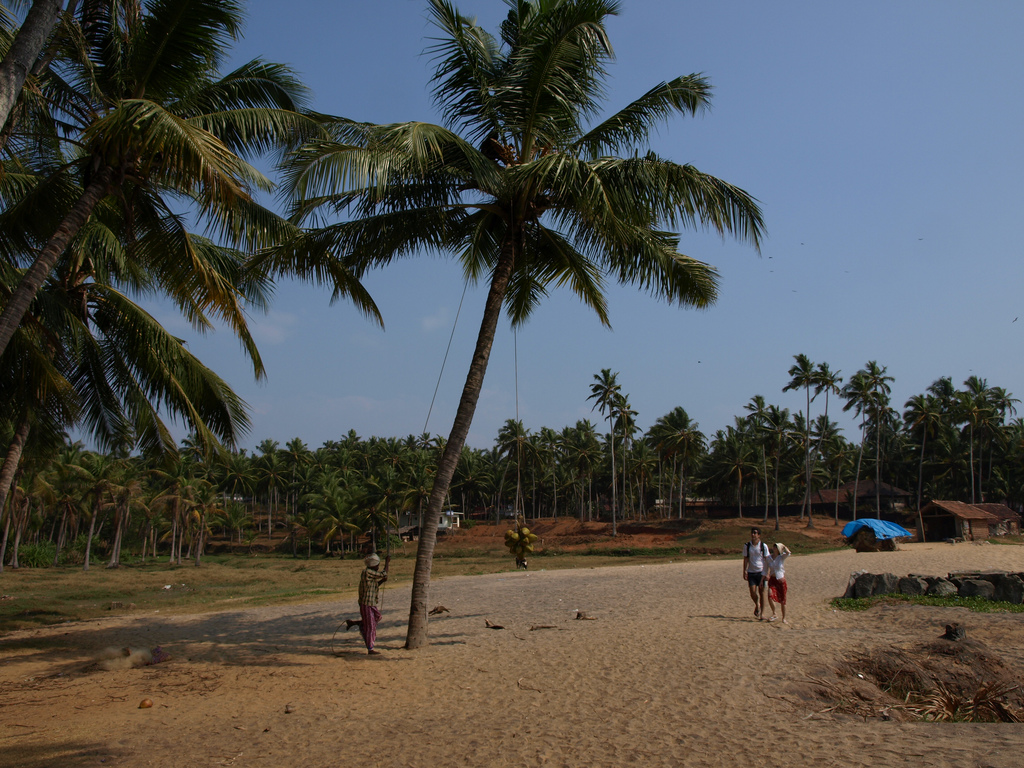
CoconutTree on a beach (Varkala)

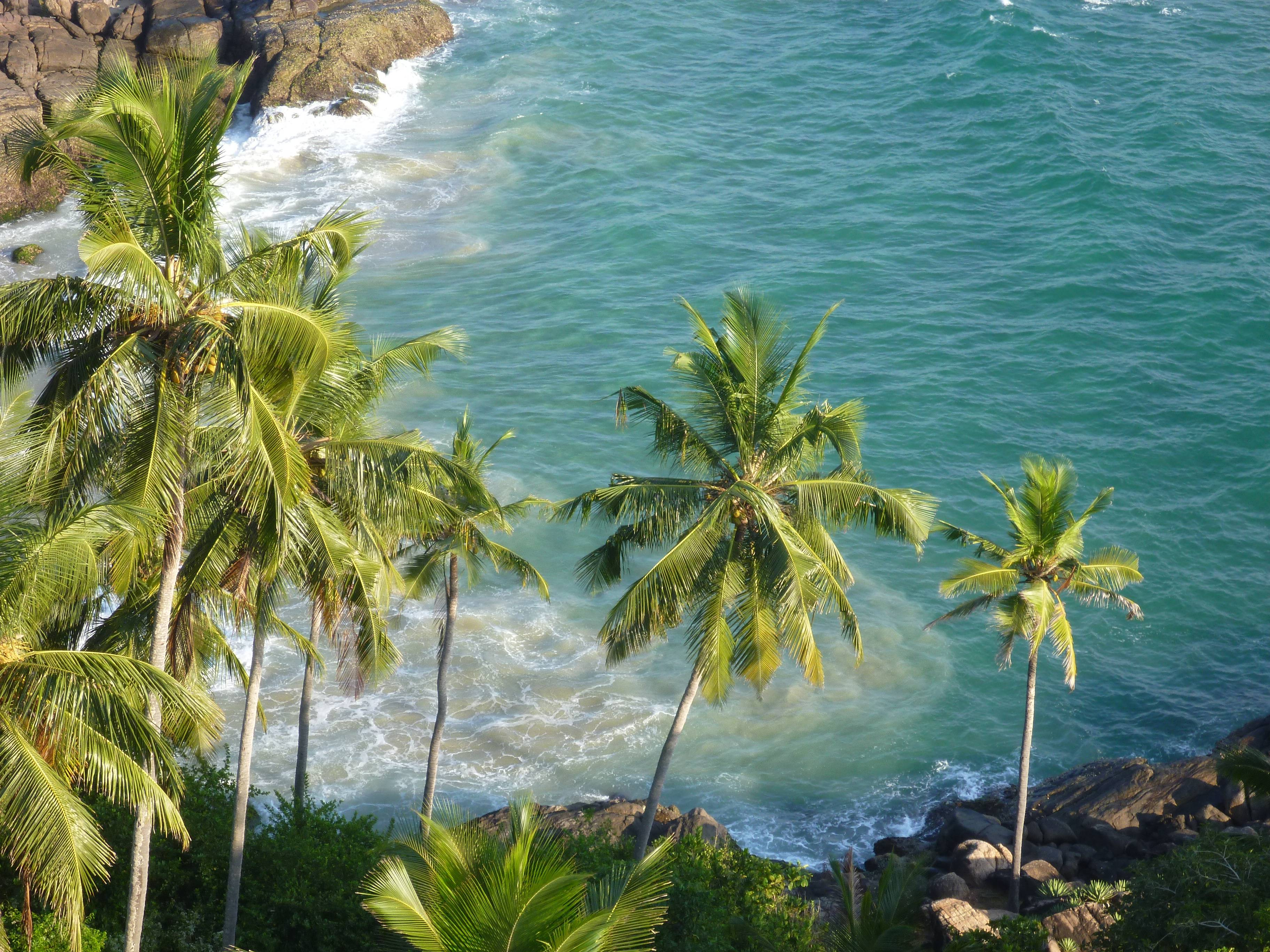
Beautiful Sea Coconut Trees

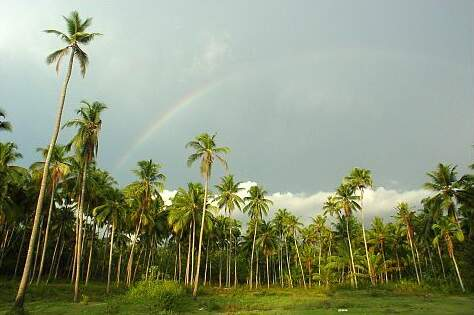
Ashtamichira

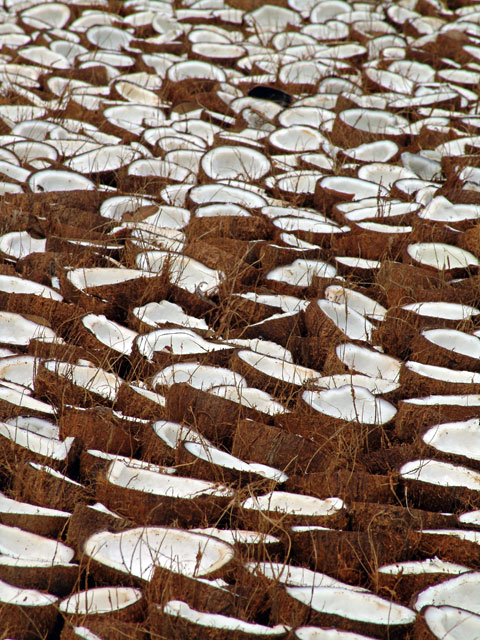
Coconuts arrangement in kerala

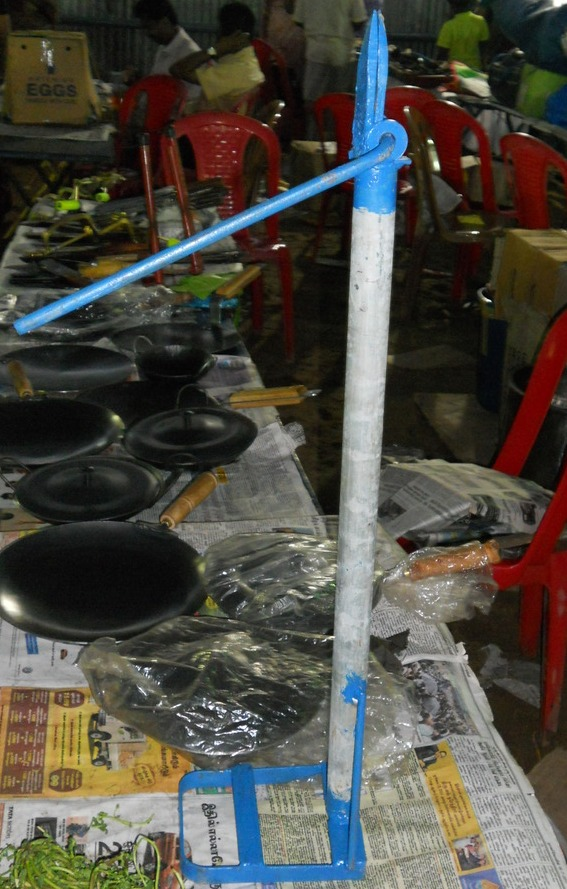
തേങ്ങ പൊതിക്കാനുള്ള ഉപകരണം

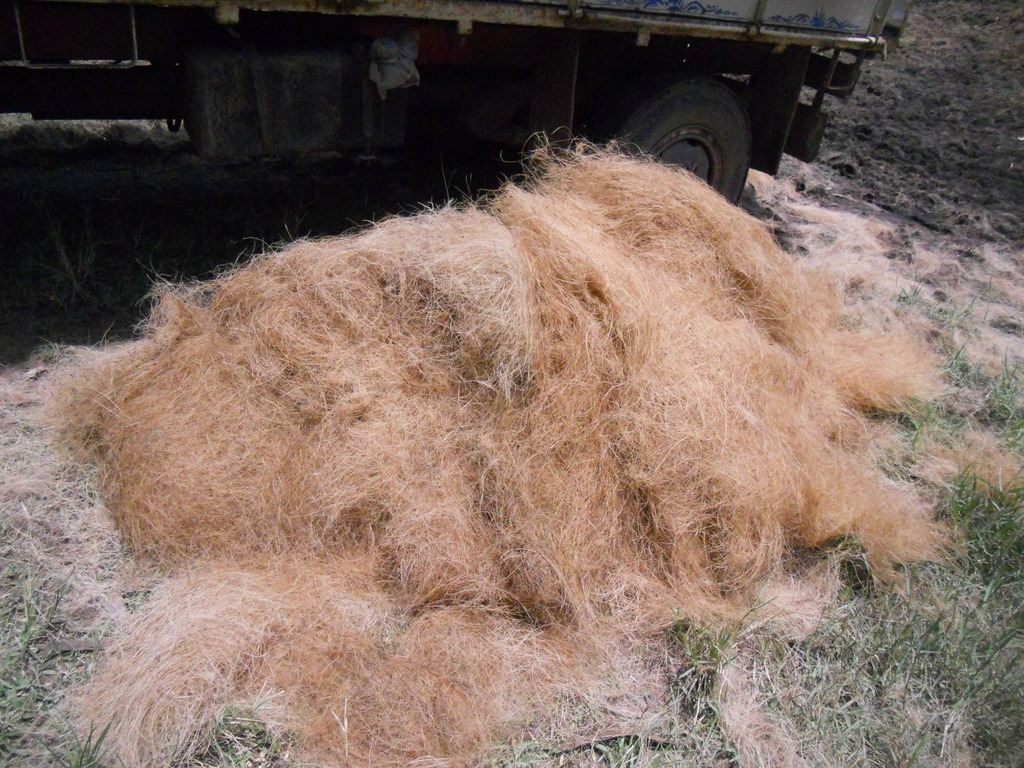
Coir fibers

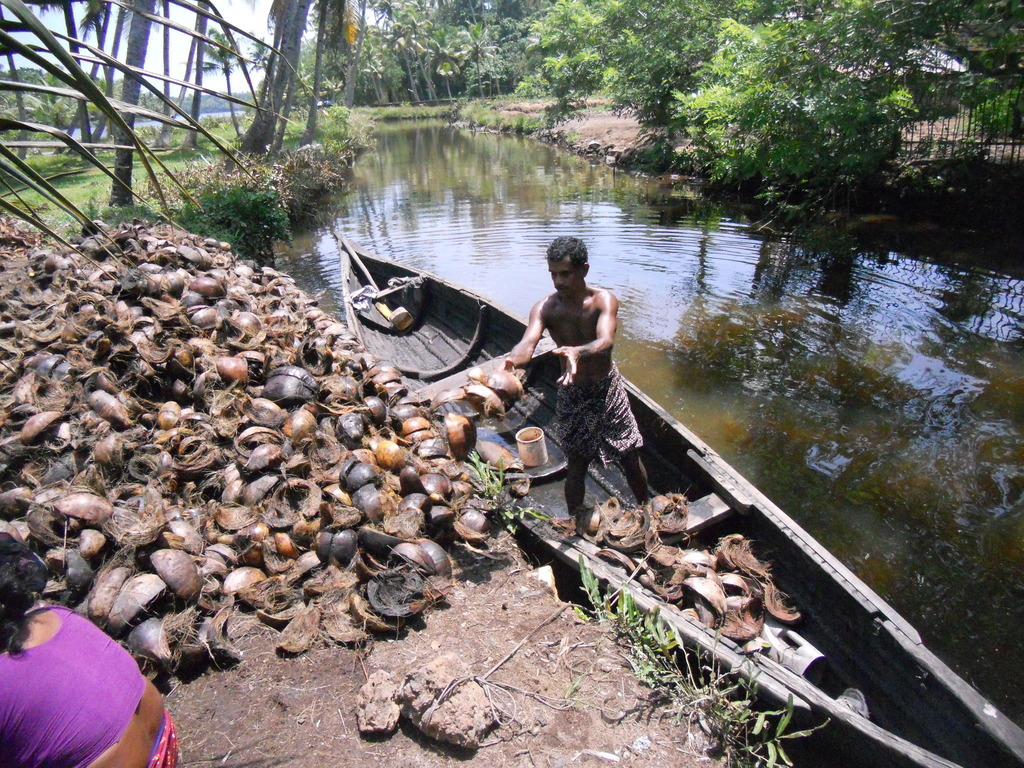
Coir worker

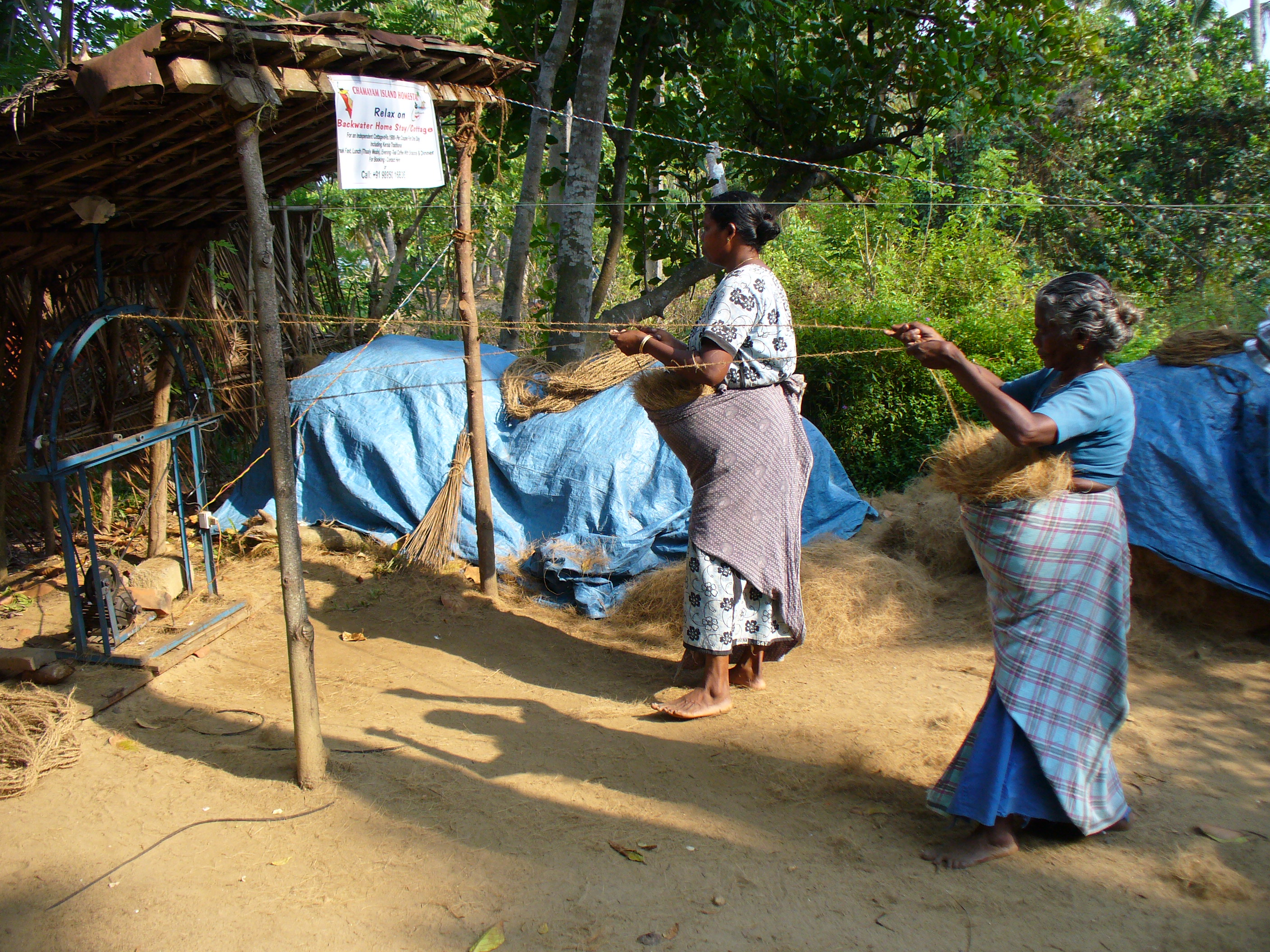
Making coir rope in Kerala

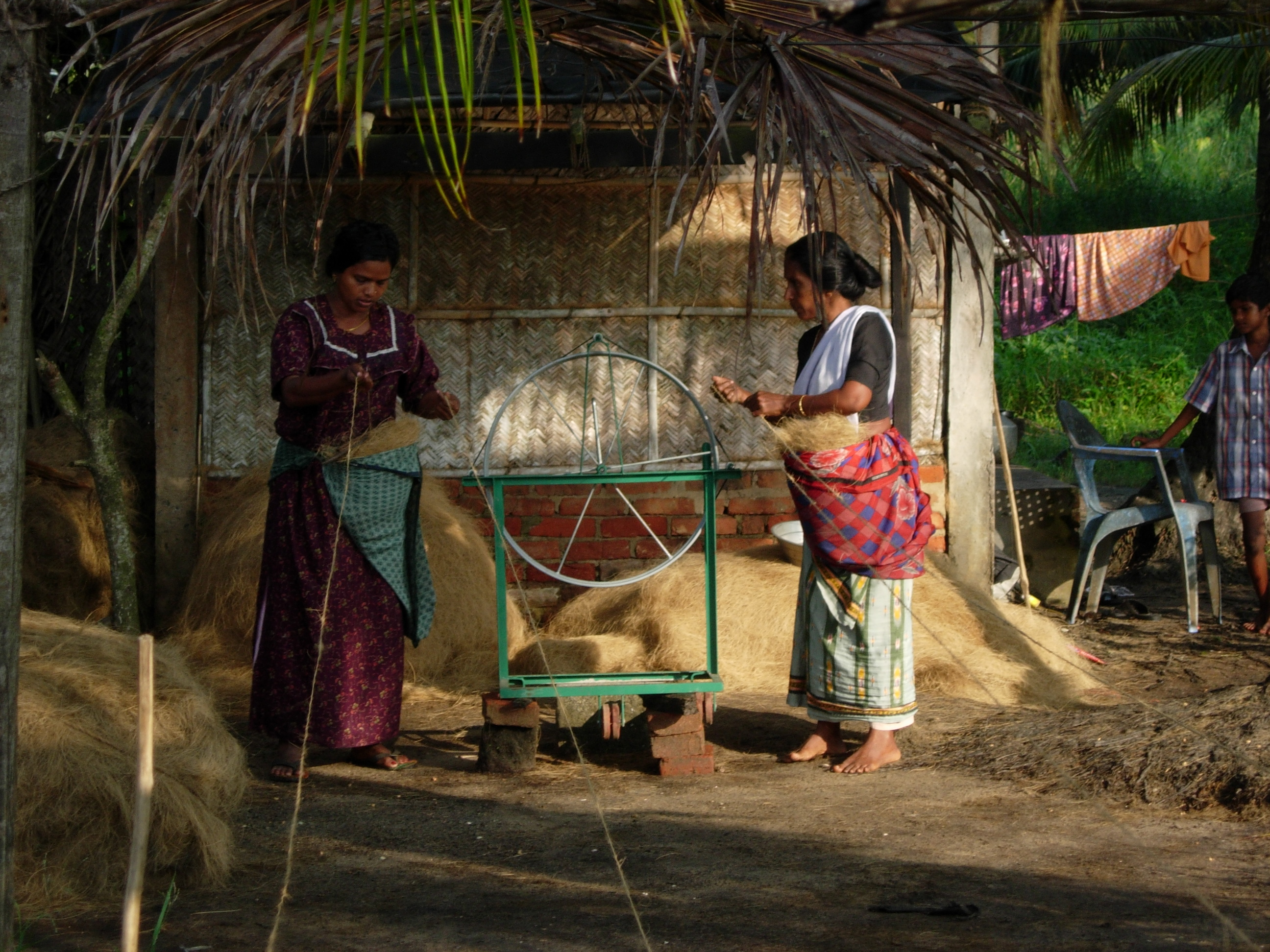
Women at work in a small scale coir spinning unit at Kollam

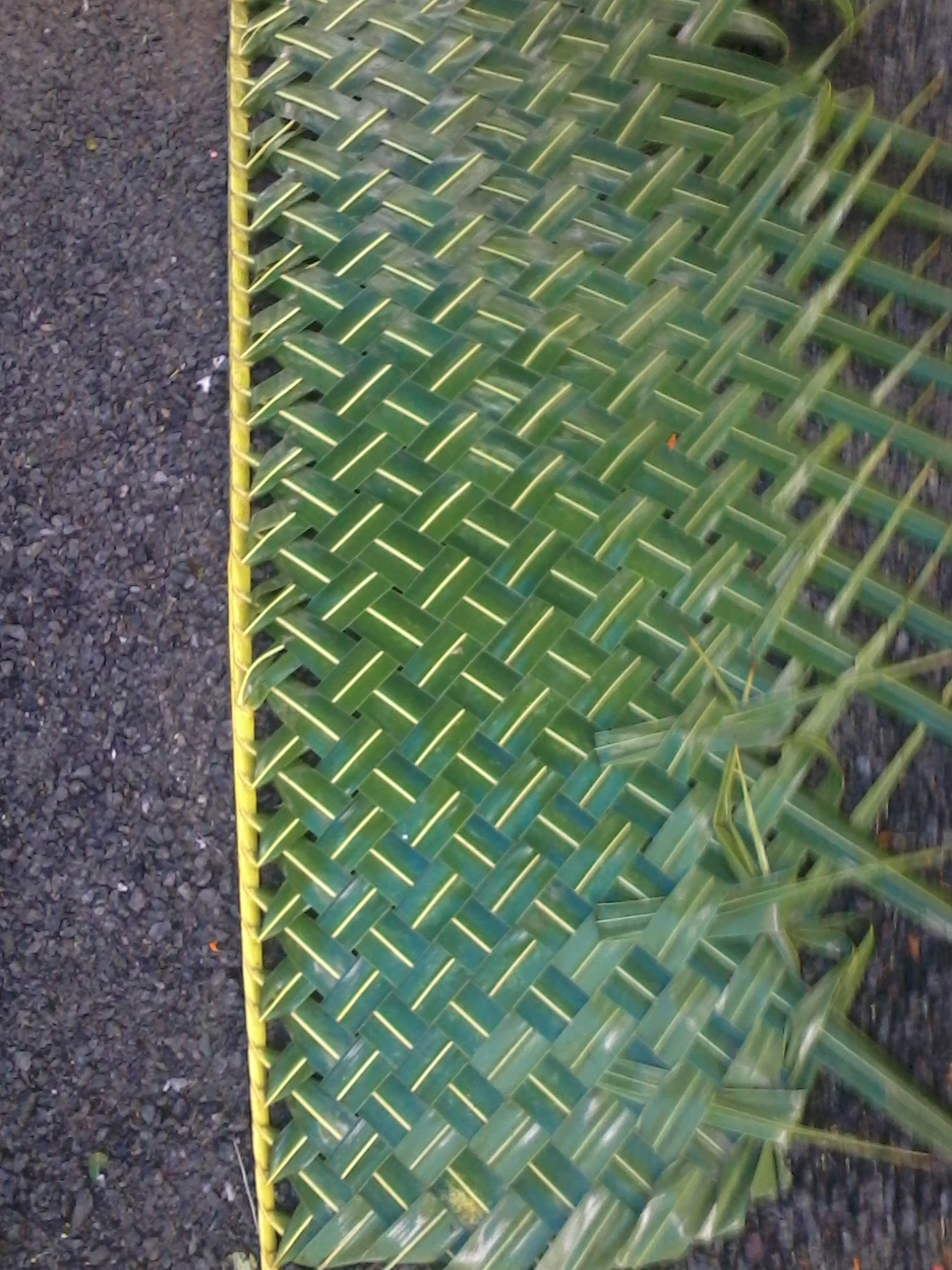
Ola madanjathu

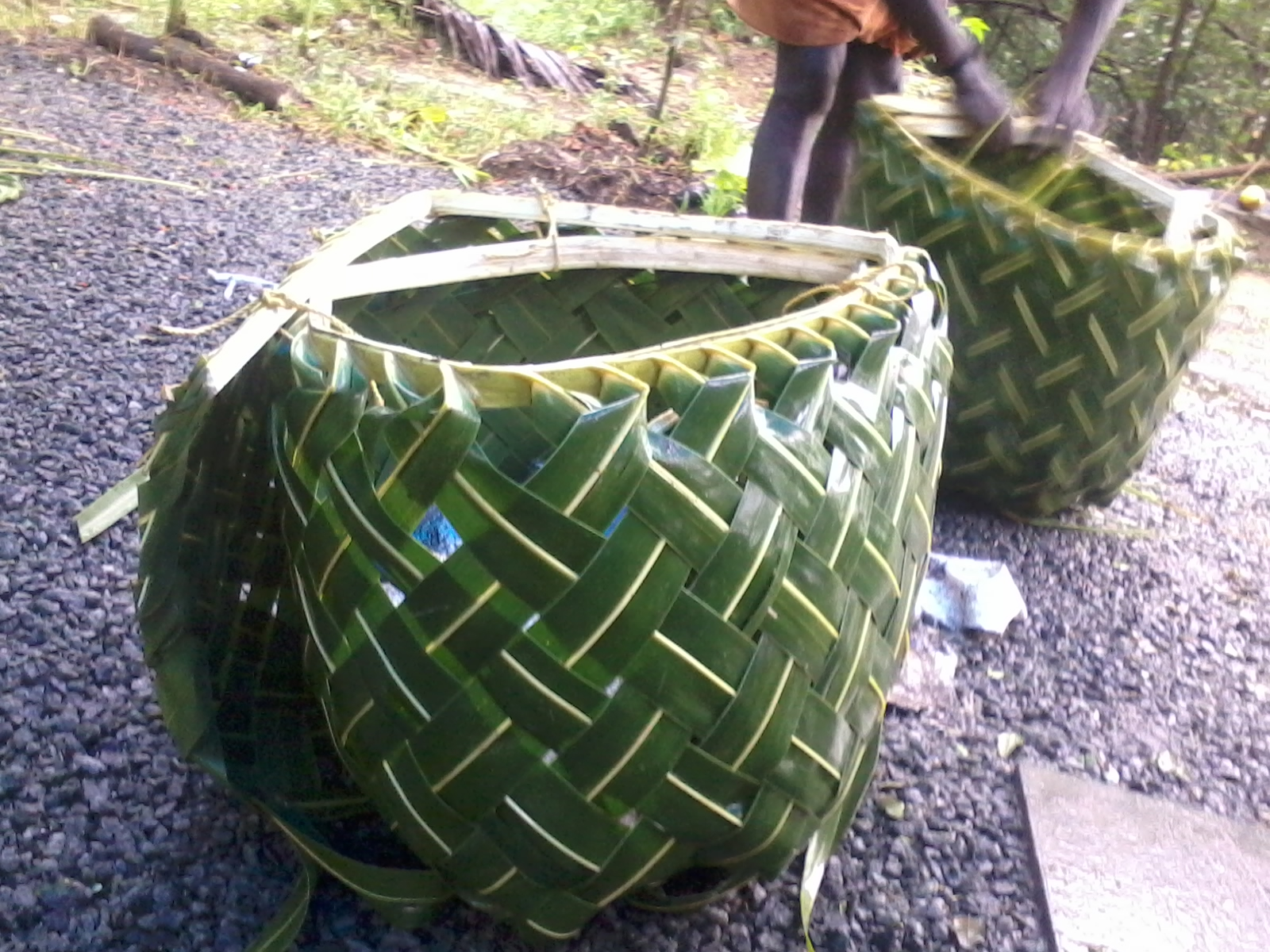
Vallom

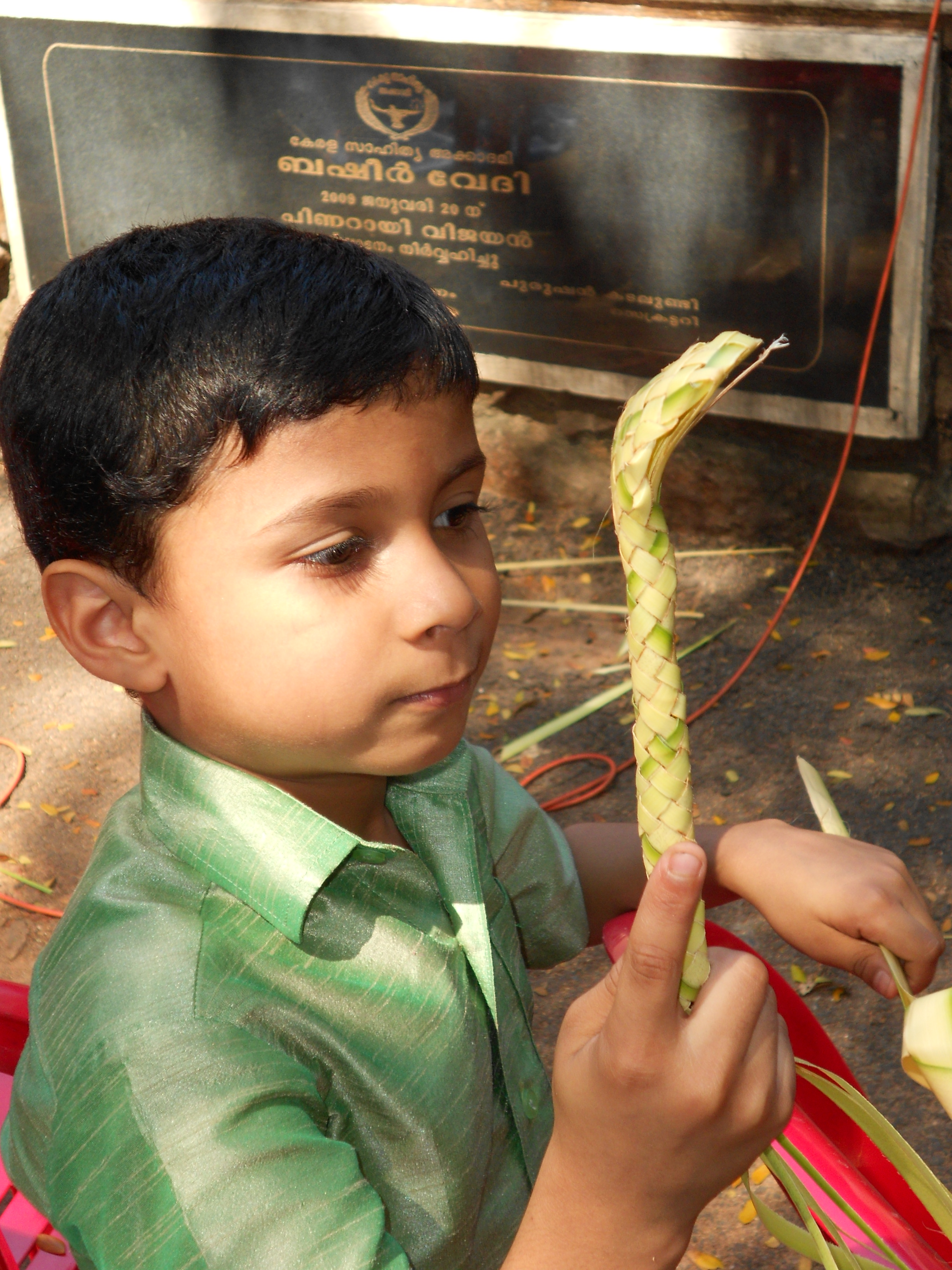
Kuruthola kalari

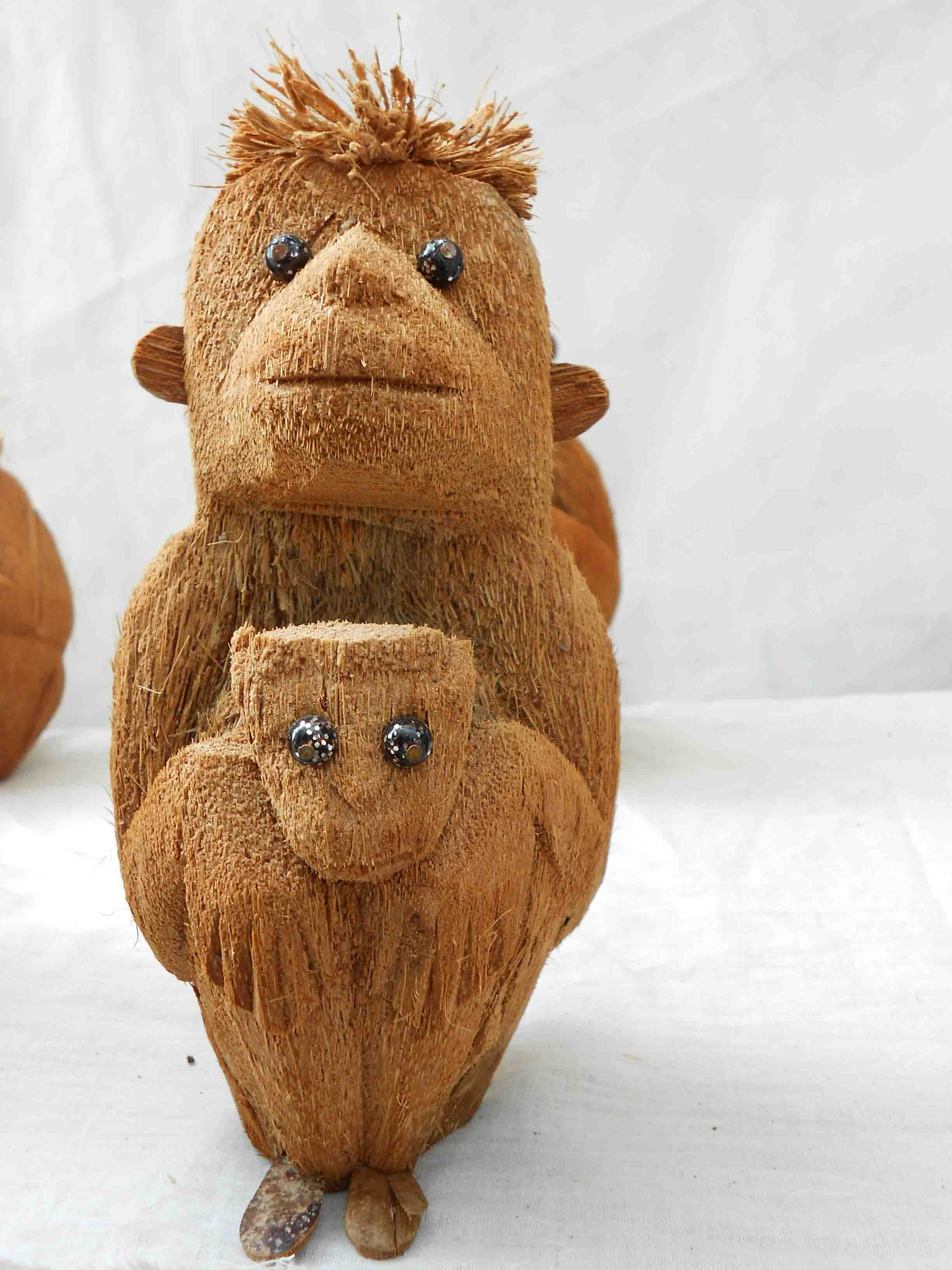
Coconut craft at Fort Kochi

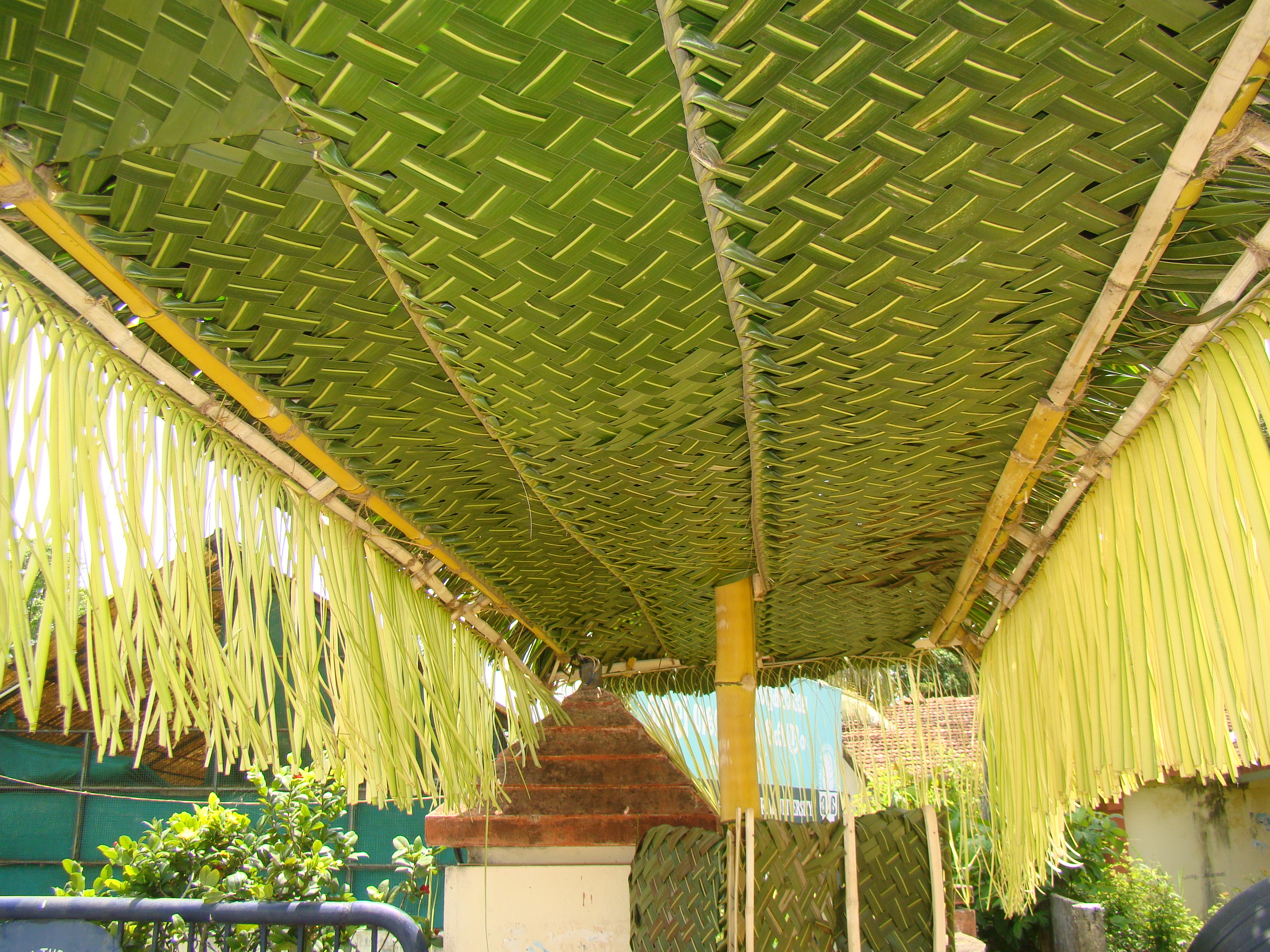
Coconut Leaf Gate

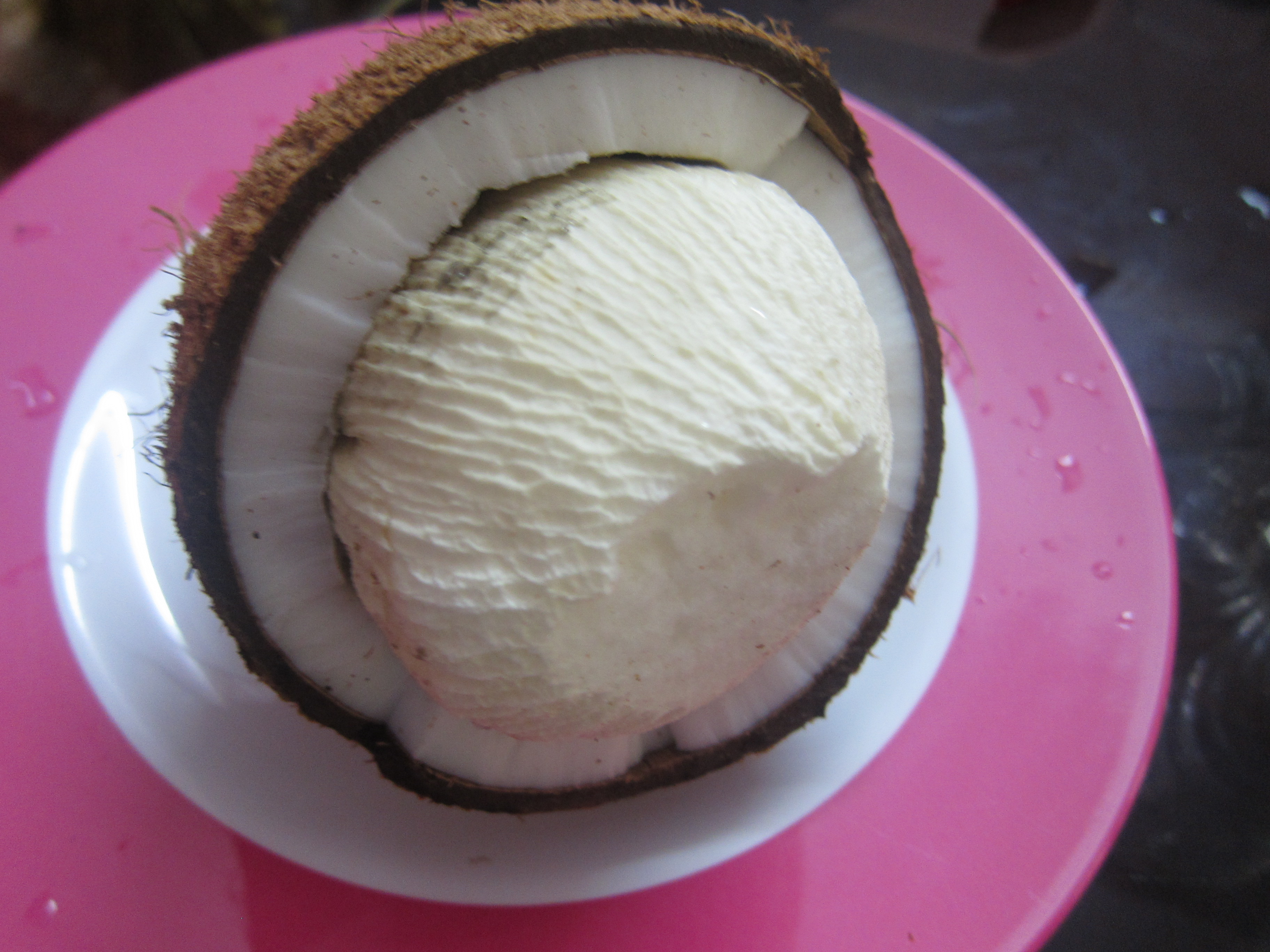
Coconut Apple - പൊങ്ങ്

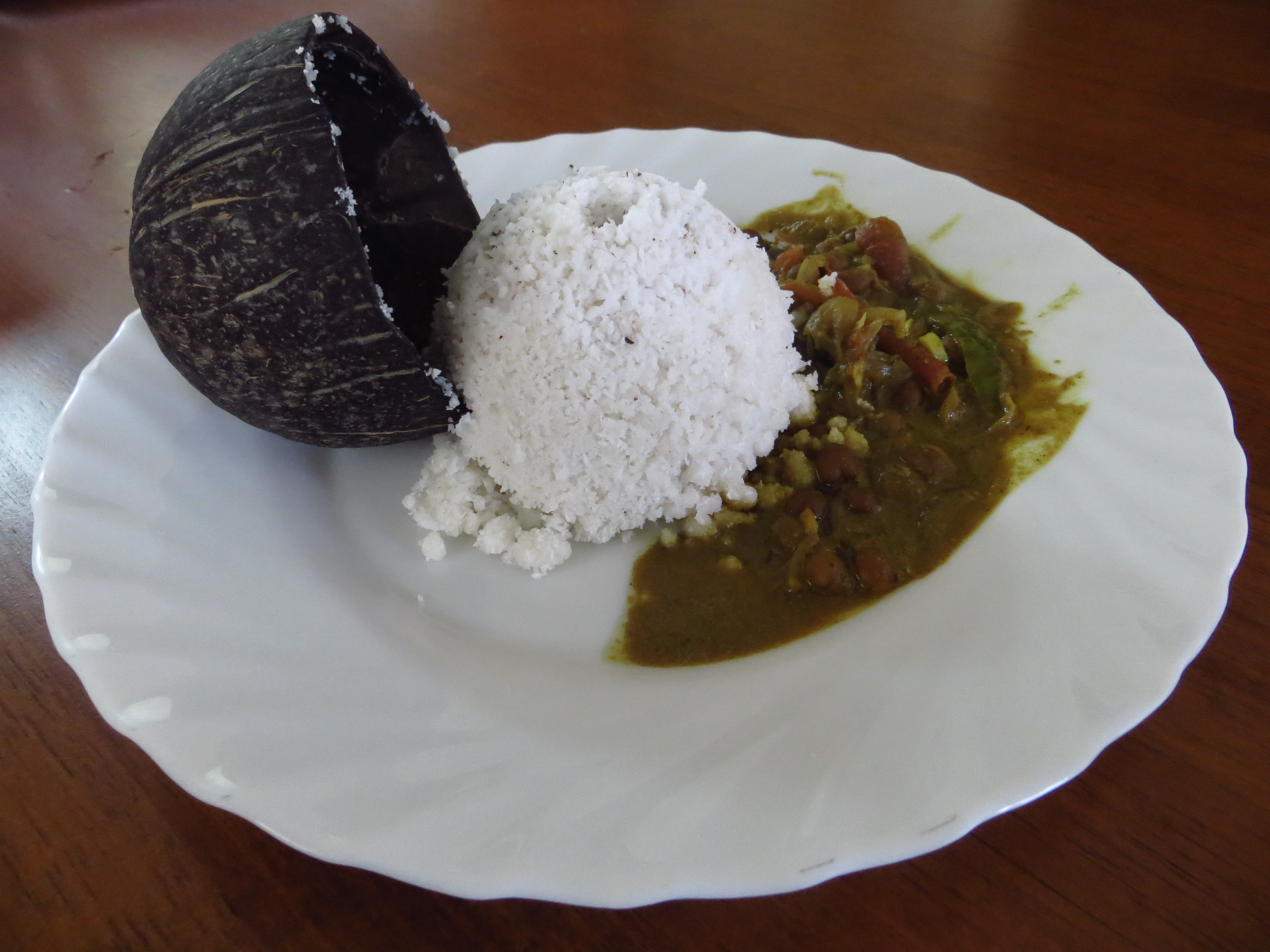
Puttu with Kadala

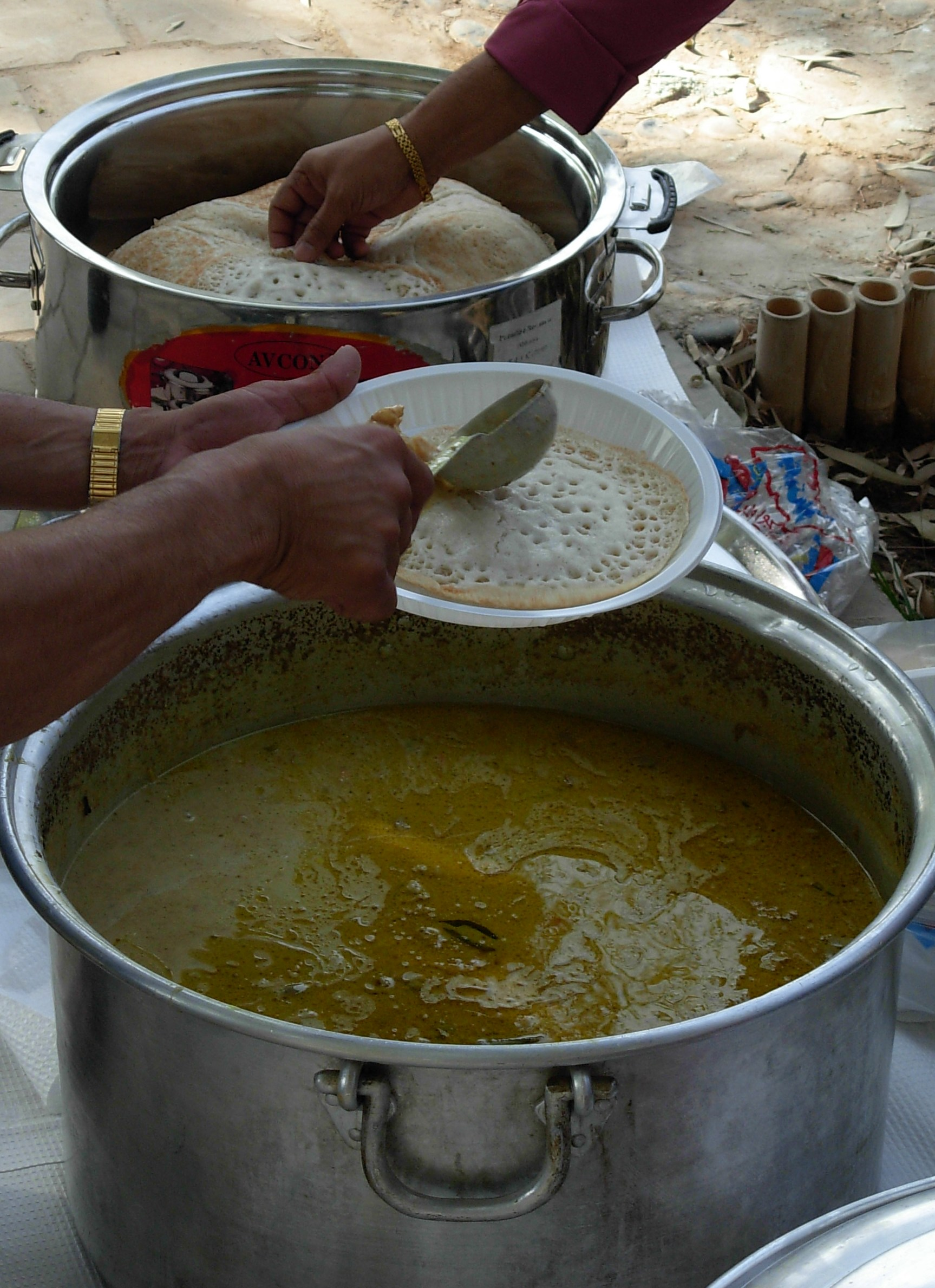
Appam and Curry

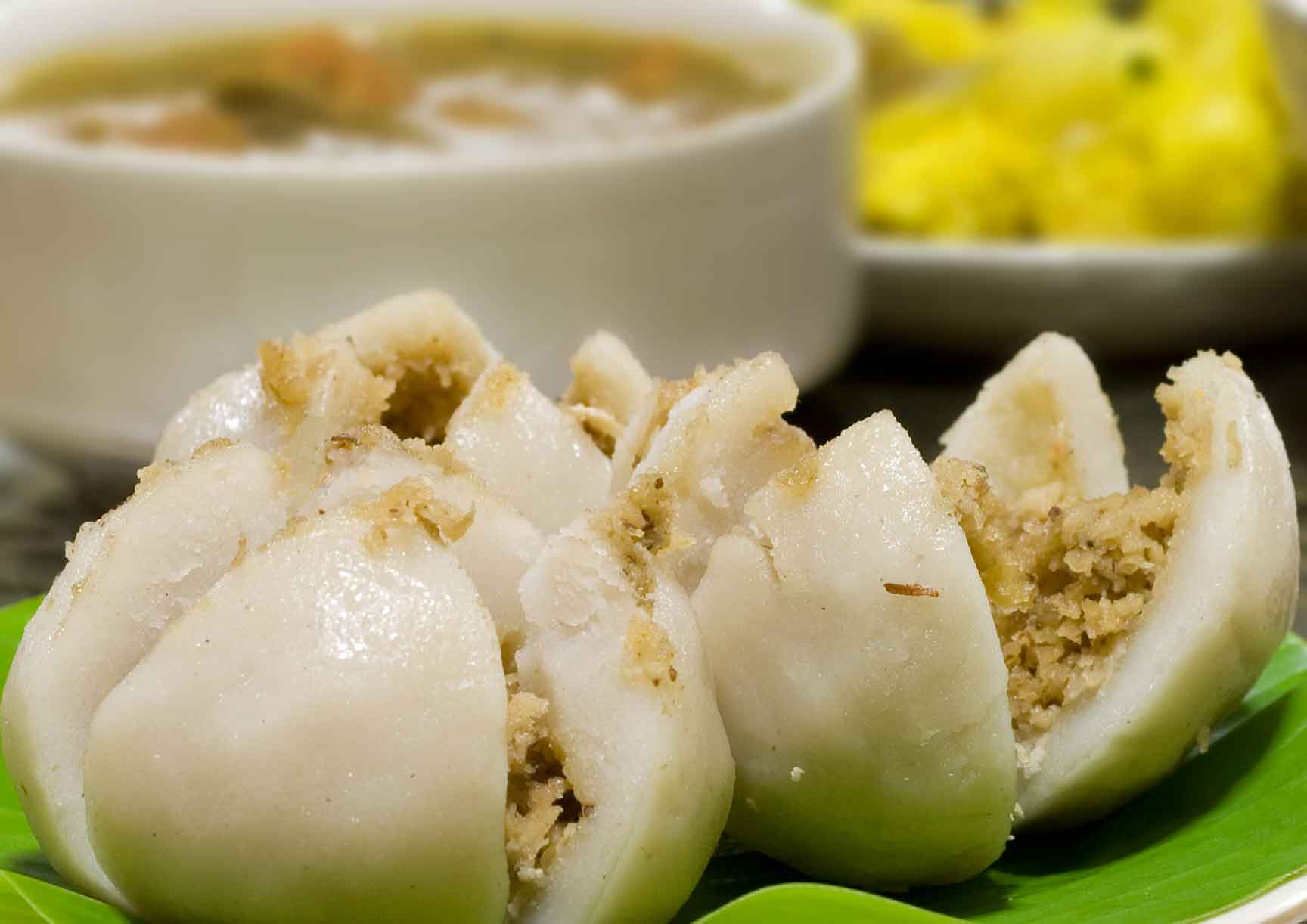
Kozhukatta - Cuisine of Kerala

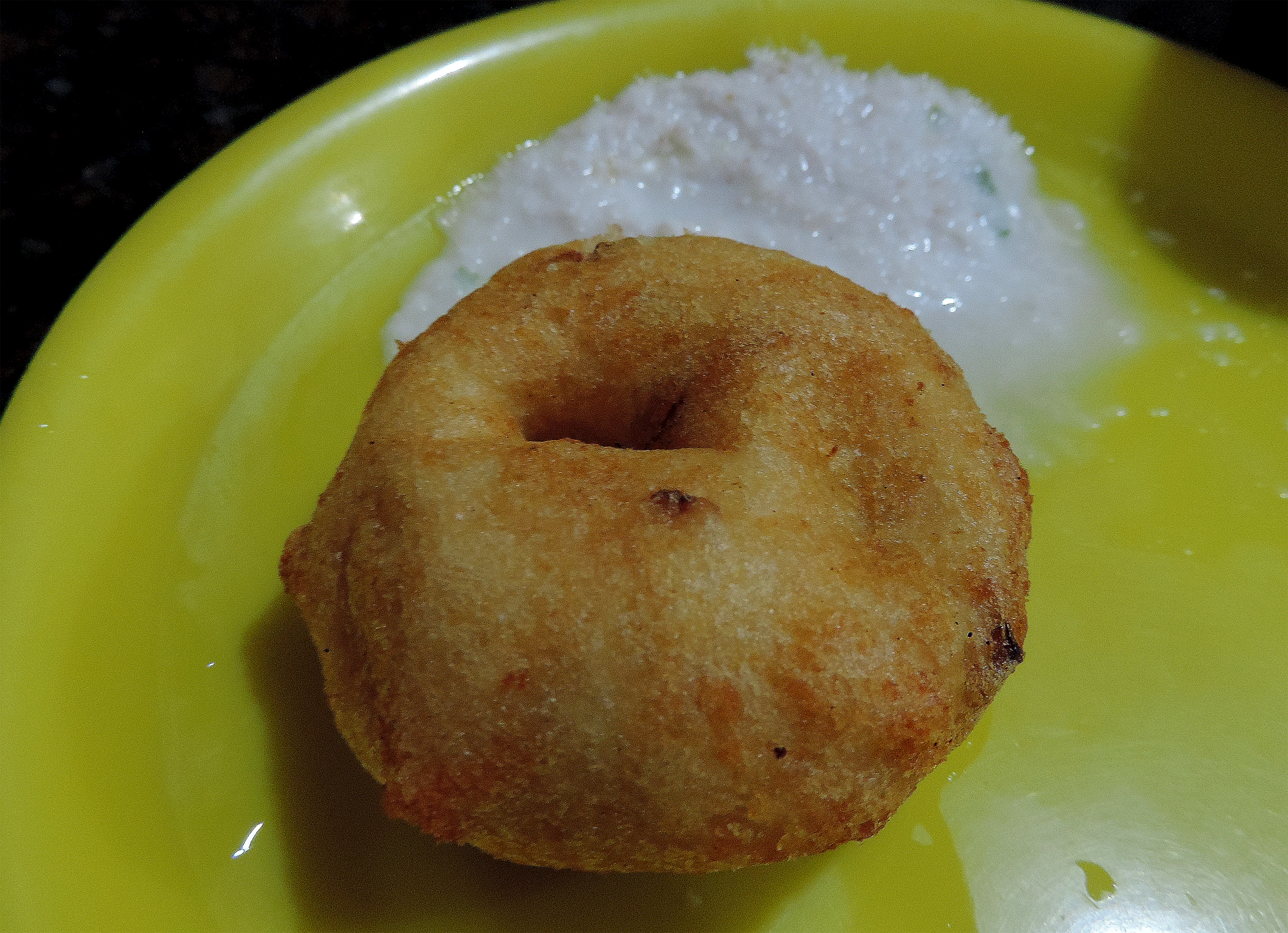
Vada (Kerala style, with coconut chutney)

== See also ==
- Coir
- Copra
- Coconut production in India
- Coconut Development Board
- Geography of Kerala
- Tourism in Kerala
- Cuisine of Kerala
