= Coconut Development Board =

Indian statutory body

Coordinates: 9.99733°N 76.285843°E

Coconut Development Board (CDB) is a statutory body established under the Ministry of Agriculture and Farmers' Welfare of the Government of India for the integrated development of coconut and coconut-related products. Coconut Development Board is a statutory body established by the Government of India for the integrated development of coconut production and utilization in the country with focus on productivity increase and product diversification.

== History ==
The Board which came into existence on 12 January 1981.

== Administration ==
It functions under the administrative control of the Ministry of Agriculture, Government of India, with its headquarters at Kochi in Kerala and regional Offices at Bengaluru in Karnataka, Chennai in Tamil Nadu, Patna in Bihar and Guwahati in Assam. There are six state centres situated at Bhubaneswar in Odisha, Kolkata in West Bengal, in Bihar, Thane in Maharashtra, Vijayawada in Andhrapradesh, Junagadh in Gujarat and Sri Vijaya Puram in the Union Territory of Andaman and Nicobar Islands. The Board has 11 Demonstration cum Seed Production (DSP) Farms in different locations of the country and now all 11 farms are maintained. A Market Development cum Information Centre has established in Delhi. The Board has set up a Technology Development Centre at Vazhakulam near Aluva in Kerala.

== See also ==
- Coconut in India
  - Coconut production in India
  - Coconut production in Kerala
- Cooperative movement in India
  - Amul, India's largest milk and dairy brand cooperative societies network
  - Coffee Board of India
  - Coir Board of India
  - Spices Board of India
  - Tea Board of India
