= Bias (disambiguation) =

Bias is an inclination toward something, or a predisposition, partiality, prejudice, preference, or predilection.

Bias may also refer to:

== Scientific method and statistics ==
- The bias introduced into an experiment through a confounder
- Algorithmic bias, machine learning algorithms that exhibit politically unacceptable behavior
- Cultural bias, interpreting and judging phenomena in terms particular to one's own culture
- Funding bias, bias relative to the commercial interests of a study's financial sponsor
- Reactivity, may result in a bias when participants behave differently when they know they are being observed. In survey research this is sometimes called response bias.
  - Demand characteristics, is when participants change their behaviour to fit their interpretation of the experiment's purpose
  - Observer-expectancy effect, is when researcher expectations influence participant behaviour (see also Pygmalion effect)
  - Social-desirability bias, is when participants adapt their behaviour to what they perceive to be social norms and expectations
  - Hawthorne effect, often relates to improving performance in response to an intervention
  - John Henry effect, sometimes relates to a behavioural change due to rivalry between groups, which may have negative outcomes
- Infrastructure bias, the influence of existing social or scientific infrastructure on scientific observations
- Publication bias, bias toward publication of certain experimental results
- Bias (statistics), the systematic distortion of a statistic
  - Biased sample, a sample falsely taken to be typical of a population
  - Estimator bias, a bias from an estimator whose expectation differs from the true value of the parameter
- Personal equation, a concept in 19th- and early 20th-century science that each observer had an inherent bias when it came to measurements and observations
- Reporting bias, a bias resulting from what is and is not reported in research, either by participants in the research or by the researcher.

== Cognitive science ==
- Cognitive bias, any of a wide range of effects identified in cognitive science.
  - Confirmation bias, tendency of people to favor information that confirm their beliefs of hypothesis
  - See List of cognitive biases for a comprehensive list

== Mathematics and engineering ==
- Exponent bias, the constant offset of an exponent's value
- Inductive bias, the set of assumptions that a machine learner uses to predict outputs of given inputs that it has not encountered.
- Weight and bias, two terms used to describe parameters in a neural network.
- Seat bias, any bias in a method of apportionment that favors either large or small parties over the other

=== Electricity ===
- Biasing, a voltage or current added to an electronic device to move its operating point to a desired part of its transfer function
- Grid bias of a vacuum tube, used to control the electron flow from the heated cathode to the positively charged anode
- Tape bias (also AC bias), a high-frequency signal (generally from 40 to 150 kHz) added to the audio signal recorded on an analog tape recorder

== Places ==
- Bias, Landes, on the coast in southwestern France
- Bias, Lot-et-Garonne, in southwestern France
- Bias, West Virginia, a community in the United States
- Bias Bay, now called Daya Bay, in Guangdong Province, China
- Bias River, a river in north-western India

== People ==
- Bias (mythology), multiple figures in Greek mythology
- Bias Brahmin, a Brahmin community found in India
- Bias of Priene, one of the Seven Sages of Greece
- Bias, a Spartan commander caught in an ambush by the Athenian general Iphicrates
- Fanny Bias (1789–1825), French dancer, one of the first who raised on pointes
- Jason Bias, American politician
- Len Bias (1963–1986), American basketball player
- Oliver Bias (born 2001), footballer
- Tiffany Bias (born 1992), Thai basketball player

== Organisations ==
- Bremer Institut für angewandte Strahltechnik (BIAS), a research institute dedicated to applied laser optics
- Belgian International Air Services (BIAS), a former airline from Belgium (1959–80)
- Birla Institute of Applied Sciences (BIAS), a higher education institute located in Bhimtal, Uttaranchal, India

== In other areas ==
- Bias (book), a book by journalist Bernard Goldberg
- Bias (bird), the genus of the black-and-white shrike-flycatcher
- Bias (textile) of a woven fabric, the 45-degree diagonal line along which it is most stretchable
- Bias frame, an image obtained from an opto-electronic image sensor, with no actual exposure time
- Bias ratio (finance), an indicator used in finance to analyze the returns of investment portfolios, and in performing due diligence
- Media bias, the influence journalists and news producers have in selecting stories to report and how they are covered
- 38050 Bias, an asteroid

== See also ==
- Handedness
- Bias-ply
