= Elite capture =

Form of political corruption

Elite capture is a form of corruption whereby public resources are biased for the benefit of a small group of people with superior social status (the elite), often damaging the welfare of the larger population. Elite capture occurs when elites use public funds, originally intended to be invested in services that benefit the larger population, to fund projects that would only benefit them. This form of corruption is differentiated from outright criminal corruption such as embezzlement, misappropriation, or other diversion of funds by a public official.

Elite capture is related to information asymmetry, inefficient regulation or inefficient allocation of resources. This causes resources to be siphoned by elite middlemen through legal practices such as noncompetitive tender of contracts, excessive pricing, and overcharging, which reduce the proportion of a government project's budget being spent on the declared mission. This causes a biased distribution of a public good or service, resulting in a situation wherein certain segments of the population experience reduced access to them. In this context, as long as there is elite capture, the welfare impact will not be Pareto optimal nor equitable.

== Elite capture in decentralization ==
For a long time, it was thought that creating decentralized governments would avoid the limitations of a single planner in society. A centralized government often lacks knowledge and might be subject to lobbying, leaving certain territories unattended. On the other hand, theory predicts that when people are involved in governance and have representation in decision making, public spending is supposed to be more efficient, more equitable and more sustainable. However, despite the theoretical predictions, the outcomes of many development projects in decentralized governments have not met these expectations.

By yielding power to smaller units, money should be more efficiently distributed, but local governments are more vulnerable to pressure groups. Failure can occur when particular subgroups of the community can mobilize resources to further their self-interest at the expense of the broader community. Local governments are even more vulnerable to capture by local elites than national governments.

Attempts to reduce elite capture in decentralized governments may involve measures such as going back to heavily-centralized planning or providing citizens with funds to initiate projects. This last option has been criticized because citizens may have a weaker ability to implement programs than local leaders. According to the World Bank, all forms of development assistance are vulnerable to manipulation or hijacking by elites because such aid requires governmental or private agencies to ensure transfer to households. Instances of elite capture are most common in this intermediary stage. Be it a centralized or decentralized government, there is a risk of ineffective public resource delivery involved, where part of the local population will receive more than the rest of the local population.

== Alternative solutions ==
Elite capture of public resources by local elites can be relatively lessened by the presence of media to balance the asymmetry of information. Empirical studies have shown that government responsiveness and accountability to ensure equal distribution of public goods and avoid elite capture are related to the availability of information and general levels of awareness among the local population.

The "counter-elite" approach advocates challenging elites by completely excluding them from the implementation of projects. It assumes that all elites are inherently bad. By raising public awareness of power inequalities and building local capacity, this approach suggests that community empowerment and political citizenship would be effective in resisting elite domination. This approach is not necessarily effective in challenging elite domination, due to the structural dependence of poor people on elites and the weakening of established institutions.

The "co-opt-elite" approach suggests that cooperation with elites, rather than confrontation, is the solution to alleviating poverty. It asserts that not all elites are bad, and some of them can play a constructive role in community development. It also assumes that a pragmatic use of elites' networks and resources can benefit poor communities. The "counter-elite" approach is not necessarily effective in eroding elite power, and also risks legitimizing the authority of the elites and worsening inequality.

=== Similar concepts ===
Elite capture and discrimination are very similar concepts because both imply unequal power status and the denial of public resources. Social discrimination can promote elite capture, but it is not an interchangeable concept. Elite capture is based on a state of unequal power relations, whereas discrimination may or may not be the cause of an unequal distribution of power. Elite capture is a changing and dynamic process, and power structures change with it when a new elite arises. Discrimination is rather static in this sense. Elite capture is a manifested form of corruption, and social discrimination is a manifestation of a set of beliefs in a society.

Elite capture and state capture are also similar because they are both related to the diversion of public resources for private benefits, but they differ in how power is exercised. Elite capture is carried out by an elite that is legitimately entitled to some level of de jure power. State capture is carried out by elites that exercise de facto power (e.g. powerful unions or big multinational companies) that aim to have influence on the decision-making process of the institutions. However, both phenomena are symptomatic of and a main reason for bad governance because they promote a vicious cycle, with long-term effects on institutional and bureaucratic performance.

== Examples ==
An example of elite capture in the United States is to be found in the literature on the subject of iron triangles, wherein special interests are able to achieve disproportionately favorable outcomes from congressional committees and federal regulators. Oftentimes, personnel between each side of the iron triangle is interchangeable, a revolving door dynamic which is favorable to the development of capture of regulators by the entities they are supposed to oversee. Also, examples are found in most developing countries, where an increasing proportion of government and foreign aid is distributed through community-driven development but fails to properly reach the target population.

Additional examples are male-dominated cultures where women may be disproportionately influenced by elite capture, since they tend to be excluded from the social elite and public services. This phenomenon may even take place where there are no clear indicators of 'capture' of power or corruption like access to education in rural areas of developing countries. While there are primary schools in the villages, they are somewhat dysfunctional due to a lack of maintenance. As a result, children have to go to neighboring villages to study. Usually, girls are not sent far away from their villages, limiting their study years. Therefore, girls are systematically denied access to a public resource (education) as opposed to boys in the same village. The absence of an enabling social, political and economic environment can also encourage unintended elite capture. But at the same time, corruption and inefficiency appear to be a concomitant part of the elite capture problem.

Elite capture also concerns land reforms. Redistributive land reforms aim to transfer agricultural land ownership from large private landowners to small farmers and people without any landholdings. It involves the redistribution of wealth and political power that comes from owning large swathes of land. However, corruption and patrimonialism in the countries implementing reforms could lead to further elite capture. In Colombia, for example, the state transferred the rights of a large amount of public land to private owners over the past two centuries, with the aim to reduce rural poverty by giving land to those who do not own any. In areas with typically small and medium size farms, the land distribution reduced inequalities in ownership. However, in areas where members of a rural elite already owned much of the land, the new plots were also diverted into the large farms.

About 7.5 percent of foreign aid is diverted by elites.

== Academic approaches ==
As with many other activities related to corruption, there have been very few systematic attempts to measure and identify causes and consequences of this phenomenon in the economy. The concept itself is still in constant evolution because a majority of the evidence comes from non-experimental case studies or empirical data sets where there is very little consensus on the outcomes. A formal representation of the level of elite capture could be done by considering a single public service and measuring how elite capture changes its per-capita enjoyment as compared to if it were equitably distributed. The idea is to consider how different the average consumption level of a certain public program would be if the average formal elites were eliminated. Empirical studies often analyze total welfare and the utility function of a society. The idea is to identify the utility function of all households in three scenarios: the current unequal distribution situation, with probability of equitable distributions and unavailability of the public service or good to finally compare the data.

== See also ==
- Discrimination
- Elite theory
- Iron triangle (US politics)
- Land reform
- Regulatory capture
- State capture
