= Fritz Roethlisberger =

American business theorist (1898–1974)

- Born: October 29, 1898; New York City, US
- Died: May 17, 1974 (aged 75); Cambridge, Massachusetts, US
- Known for: Hawthorne Studies

Academic background
- Education: Columbia University; MIT; Harvard University
- Academic advisor: Elton Mayo

Fritz Jules Roethlisberger (October 29, 1898 – May 17, 1974) was a social scientist and management theorist at the Harvard Business School.

== Biography ==
Fritz J. Roethlisberger was born in 1898 in New York City. He earned a BA in engineering at Columbia University in 1921, supplementing this degree with a BS in engineering administration from MIT in 1923. Soon after, he shifted to philosophy studies at Harvard, where he earned an M.A. in 1925.

Upon completing his studies, Roethlisberger began working with Elton Mayo, a professor at Harvard Business School. Roethlisberger joined Mayo in studying human behavior, becoming Mayo's assistant in the Department of Industrial Research. This marked the beginning of Roethlisberger's exploration of organizational behavior.

Roethlisberger held the following positions at Harvard Business School: instructor of industrial research, 1927–1930; assistant professor of industrial research, 1930–1938; associate professor of industrial research, 1938–1946; Wallace Brett Donham Professor of Human Relations, 1950–1974.

=== The Hawthorne Studies ===
The Hawthorne studies marked a turning point in organizational behavior research. These studies, conducted at Hawthorne Works, a telephone equipment factory in Cicero, Illinois, from 1924 to 1933, aimed to improve worker conditions and understand the dynamic relationships between managers and workers. Roethlisberger, alongside Elton Mayo and others, conducted a series of experiments, focusing on factors like lighting, rest periods, payment systems, and approaches to management approaches.

The Hawthorne studies revealed insights that challenged traditional principles in organizational behavior. Roethlisberger's role was critical, spending extensive time at the factories and observing various results. The studies shifted from a focus on physical factors to a social psychological approach.

The Hawthorne studies yielded primarily five insights:

1. Individual work behavior is influenced by a complex set of factors, not simple cause-and-effect relationships.
2. Informal workgroups develop norms between individual needs and the work setting.
3. The social structure of informal groups is maintained through symbols of prestige and power.
4. Supervisors should listen to employee complaints to understand individual needs.
5. Awareness of employee sentiments and participation can reduce resistance to change.

In 1937, Roethlisberger published the first comprehensive findings of the Hawthorne experiments. He also authored Management and the Worker using these findings in 1939. The book was voted the tenth most influential management book of the 20th century in a poll of the Fellows of the Academy of Management.

=== After the Hawthorne Studies ===
After the Hawthorne Studies, Fritz J. Roethlisberger's continued to study organizational behavior, particularly human relations, at Harvard Business School. His focus remained on improving worker-manager relationships, advocating for a human-centric approach to organizational studies.

In 1941, Roethlisberger and American sociologist, William John Dickson, published the book Management and Morale, which examined the significance of personnel management, leadership, and their effects on worker morale. Aligning with his earlier work, Roethlisberger continued emphasizing the importance of relationships in organizations.

In 1968, Roethlisberger published Man-in-Organization, a collection of essays spanning 1928–1968. The essays, directed at social scientists, showcased his curiosity and in-depth exploration of various aspects of human behavior in organizations.

Roethlisberger's final work was The Elusive Phenomena: An Autobiographical Account of My Work in the Field of Organizational Behavior at the Harvard Business School, published in 1977. The book combined an autobiographical account of his career with reflections and new insights.

=== The Contributions of Roethlisberger's Work ===
Roethlisberger endured a long career at Harvard, publishing several more notable works on human relations in the workplace. Roethlisberger focused on enhancing the understanding of organizational behavior and improving job performance in the workplace. Although never having a high profile in his field, he nevertheless helped to execute and extract conclusions from one of the most important workplace studies ever carried out.

== Publications ==
Books:

- Dickson, W. J. and Roethlisberger, F. J. (1966) Counseling in an Organization: A Sequel to the Hawthorne Researches, Boston, MA: Harvard Business School Press
- Roethlisberger, F.J.; Dickson, W.J. (1939). Management and the worker: an account of a research program conducted by the Western electric company, Hawthorne works, Chicago. Cambridge, MA: Harvard University Press.
- Roethlisberger, Fritz Jules (1941). Management and Morale. Cambridge, MA: Harvard University Press.
- Roethlisberger, F.J. (1968). Man in organization. Cambridge, MA: Belknap Press of Harvard University Press.
- Roethlisberger, F.J. (1977). The elusive phenomena. An autobiographical account of my work in the field of organizational behavior at the Harvard Business School. Cambridge, MA: Harvard Business School Press.
- Roethlisberger, F.J. (1954) Training for Human Relations. Cambridge, MA: Harvard University Press.
- Zaleznick, A., Christensen, C. R. and Roethlisberger, F. J. (1958) The Motivation, Productivity and Satisfaction of Workers, Cambridge, MA: Harvard Business School Press.

Articles, a selection:

- Roethlisberger, Fritz J. (1945). "The foreman: Master and victim of double talk". Harvard Business Review. 23 (3): 283–298.
