= Fake security camera =

Non-functional surveillance cameras intended to fool intruders

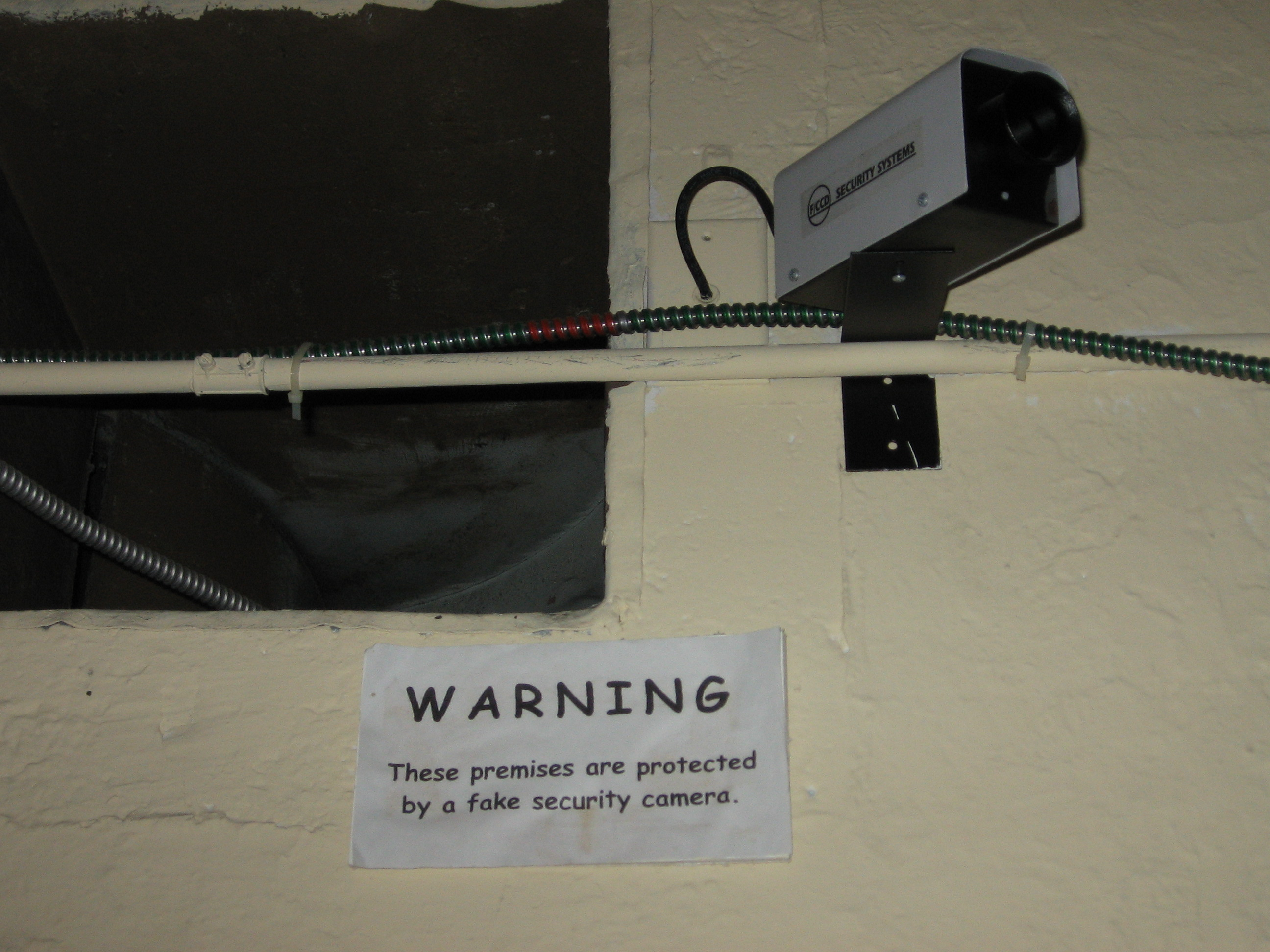
Fake security camera at the Museum of Bad Art.

Fake security cameras (or dummy cameras, simulated cameras, decoy cameras) are non-functional surveillance cameras designed to fool intruders, or anyone who it is supposedly watching. Those cameras are intentionally placed in a noticeable place, so passing people notice them and believe the area to be monitored by CCTV.

The cheapest fake security cameras can be recognized by not having real lenses (the "lenses" are just an opaque piece of plastic) Other fake cameras include broken real cameras, motion sensors disguised as cameras, or empty camera housings. They may have flashing lights, or a motor to simulate pan-tilt motion; the former can be a giveaway that the camera is fake.

== See also ==
- Hawthorne effect
- Watching-eye effect
- Situation awareness
