= Reactivity (psychology) =

Phenomenon in psychological research

Reactivity is a phenomenon that occurs when individuals alter their performance or behavior due to the awareness that they are being observed. The change may be positive or negative, and depends on the situation. It is a significant threat to a research study's external validity and is typically controlled for using blind experiment designs.

There are several forms of reactivity. The Hawthorne effect occurs when research study participants know they are being studied and alter their performance because of the attention they receive from the experimenters. The John Henry effect, a specific form of Hawthorne effect, occurs when the participants in the control group alter their behavior out of awareness that they are in the control group, out of rivalry with the experimental group.

Reactivity is not limited to changes in behaviour in relation to being merely observed; it can also refer to situations where individuals alter their behavior to conform to the expectations of the observer. An experimenter effect occurs when the experimenters subtly communicate their expectations to the participants, who alter their behavior to conform to these expectations. The Pygmalion effect occurs when students alter their behavior to meet teacher expectations.

Reactivity can also occur in response to self-report measures if the measure is elicited from research participants during a task. For example, both confidence ratings and judgments of learning, which are often provided repeatedly throughout cognitive assessments of learning and reasoning, have been found to be reactive. In addition there may be important individual differences in how participants react to a particular self-report measure.

Espeland & Sauder (2007) took a reactivity lens to investigate how rankings of educational institutions change expectations and permeate institutions. These authors investigate the consequences, both intended and unintended, of such public measures.

A common solution to reactivity is unobtrusive research that can replace or augment reactive research. Unobtrusive research refers to methods in which the researchers are able to obtain information without interfering in the research itself. Results gathered from unobtrusive methods tend to have very high test-retest reliability.

== See also ==
- Bradley effect
- Demand characteristics
- Observer-expectancy effect
- Watching-Eye Effect
- Social desirability bias
