= Intellectual honesty =

Applied method of problem solving

Intellectual honesty is an applied method of problem solving characterised by a nonpartisan and honest attitude, which can be demonstrated in a number of different ways:

- One's personal beliefs or politics do not interfere with the pursuit of truth;
- Relevant facts and information are not purposefully omitted, even when such things may contradict one's hypothesis;
- Facts are presented in an unbiased manner and not twisted to give misleading impressions or to support one view over another;
- References, or earlier work, are acknowledged where possible, and plagiarism is avoided.

Harvard ethicist Louis M. Guenin describes the "kernel" of intellectual honesty to be "a virtuous disposition to eschew deception when given an incentive for deception".

== Academia ==
In academia, intellectual honesty necessitates that students, academics, and researchers openly disclose the origins of their ideas and give due credit to others in their writing. This fundamental principle serves as a cornerstone for the acquisition and progression of knowledge. As knowledge usually builds upon previous insights, advancements rely on the collaborative efforts of contributors. In scholarly systems, these contributions undergo rigorous evaluation before becoming a basis for further exploration. Upholding intellectual honesty is thought to be crucial to guarantee the transparency and openness of intellectual contributions in order to foster constructive criticism.

== Science ==
Intellectual honesty has been described as part of integrity in scientific research. Integrity includes:

- ensuring precision in depicting one's contributions to research proposals and reports
- upholding impartiality in the process of peer review; fostering a collaborative and supportive atmosphere in scientific interactions, encompassing communication and resource sharing
- being forthright about conflicts of interest or potential conflicts of interest; prioritizing the welfare and safeguarding the rights of human subjects involved in research endeavors
- practicing ethical treatment of animals in the course of research activities
- adhering to the reciprocal responsibilities existing between investigators and their research teams.

== Business ==
Within the realm of business, intellectual honesty entails basing decisions on factual evidence, consistently pursuing truth in problem-solving, and setting aside personal aspirations. The adoption of intellectual honesty by organizations is thought to foster a culture of ongoing learning and receptiveness to novel ideas. This mindset frequently catalyzes enhancements across the entire organization, particularly when intellectual honesty becomes an integral part of the corporate culture. While psychological safety is sometimes understood a key to business innovation through fostering social cohesion and aiding learning, research has also shown that it can inadvertently hinder intellectual honesty instead of fostering it.

== See also ==
- Academic honesty
- Conflict of interest
- Epistemic feedback
- Good faith
- Intellectual
- List of fallacies
- Scientific method
- Sophism
- Systemic bias
