= Human relations movement =

Movement based on human relations

Human relations movement refers to the researchers of organizational development who study the behaviour of people in groups, particularly in workplace groups and other related concepts in fields such as industrial and organizational psychology. It originated in the 1930s' Hawthorne studies, which examined the effects of social relations, motivation and employee satisfaction on factory productivity. The movement viewed workers in terms of their psychology and fit with companies, rather than as interchangeable parts, and it resulted in the creation of the discipline of human relations management.

== Mayo's work ==
Elton Mayo stressed the following:

1. The power of natural groups, in which social aspects take precedence over functional organizational structures.
2. The need for reciprocal communication, in which communication is two way, from worker to chief executive, as well as vice versa.
3. The development of high quality leadership to communicate goals and to ensure effective and coherent decision making.

It has become a concern of all many companies to improve the job-oriented interpersonal skills of employees. The teaching of these skills to employees is referred to as "soft skills" training. Companies need their employees to be able to successfully communicate and convey information, to be able to interpret others' emotions, to be open to others' feelings, and to be able to solve conflicts and arrive at resolutions. By acquiring these skills, the employees, those in management positions, and the customer can maintain more compatible relationships.

== Arguments against Mayo's involvement in human relations ==
Mayo's work is considered by various academics to be the basic counterpoint of Taylorism and scientific management. Taylorism, founded by Frederick W. Taylor, sought to apply science to the management of employees in the workplace in order to gain economic efficiency through labour productivity. Elton Mayo's work has been widely attributed to the discovery of the 'social person', allowing for workers to be seen as individuals rather than merely robots designed to work for unethical and unrealistic productivity expectations. However, this theory has been contested, as Mayo's purported role in the human relations movement has been questioned. Nonetheless, although Taylorism attempted to justify scientific management as a holistic philosophy, rather than a set of principles, the human relations movement worked parallel to the notion of scientific management. Its aim was to address the social welfare needs of workers and therefore elicit their co-operation as a workforce.

The widely perceived view of human relations is said to be one that completely contradicts the traditional views of Taylorism. Whilst scientific management tries to apply science to the workforce, the accepted definition of human relations suggests that management should treat workers as individuals, with individual needs. In doing so, employees are supposed to gain an identity, stability within their job and job satisfaction, which in turn make them more willing to co-operate and contribute their efforts towards accomplishing organisational goals. The human relations movement supported the primacy of organizations to be attributed to natural human groupings, communication and leadership. However, the conventional depiction of the human relations 'school' of management, rising out of the ashes of scientific management is argued to be a rhetorical distortion of events.

Firstly, it has been argued that Elton Mayo's actual role in the human relations movement is controversial and although he is attributed to be the founder of this movement, some academics believe that the concept of human relations was used well before the Hawthorne investigations, which sparked the human relations movement. Bruce and Nyland (2011) suggest that many academics preceded Mayo in identifying a concept similar to that of the human relations movement even going as far to suggest that the output and information collected by the Hawthorne investigations was identified well before Mayo by Taylor. In addition, Wren and Greenwood (1998) argue that Taylor made important contributions to what inspires human motivation, even though his ultimate findings were somewhat different from the human relations movement.

Another name which has been attributed to pre-existing human relations ideas is that of Henry S. Dennison. The one time president of the Taylor Society has been linked to both Taylorist principles as well human relation ideals thus creating a nexus between Taylorism and human relation thought. Dennison demonstrated an activist concern both with the rationale and character of workers, and with the control and management undertaken by managers of the business enterprise.

In order to assess the validity of human relations as a benchmark for rights within the workplace, the contribution of Taylorism in comparison to human relations must be established. Taylorism and scientific management entailed to be a "complete mental revolution" and as Taylor explained, Taylorism sought to encourage managers and labourers to "take their eyes off of the division of the surplus as the important matter, and together turn their attention toward increasing the size of the surplus." This notion of management appealed to the employer as it addressed organisational problems, inefficiencies and adverse employer-employee relations. Scientific management aimed to use science and qualitative data in the selection of employees and facilitate the use of employee databases and performance reviews. Firstly, scientific management aimed to reduce inefficiency through studying the time and motions in work tasks. The object of time studies was to determine how fast a job should and could be done. Secondly, Taylor purported to introduce specific quantitative goals to individual employees in order to provide challenging time restraints and thus increasing productivity. Most importantly, Taylor sought to increase productivity through organization of behaviour.

== See also ==
- Group dynamics
- People skills
- Social psychology
