= Social cue =

Verbal or non-verbal actions used to guide social interactions

Social cues are verbal or non-verbal signals expressed through the face, body, voice, motion (and more) and guide conversations as well as other social interactions by influencing our impressions of and responses to others. These percepts are important communicative tools as they convey important social and contextual information and therefore facilitate social understanding.

A few examples of social cues include:

- eye gaze
- facial expression
- vocal tone
- body language

Social cues are part of social cognition and serve several purposes in navigating the social world. Due to our social nature, humans rely heavily on the ability to understand other peoples' mental states and make predictions about their behaviour. Especially in the view of evolution, this ability is critical in helping to determine potential threats and advantageous opportunities; and in helping to form and maintain relationships in order to fulfill safety and basic physiological needs. These cues allow us to predict other people's meanings and intentions in order to be able to respond in an efficient and adaptive manner, as well as to anticipate how others might respond to one's own choices. For instance, people were found to behave more prosocially in economic games when being watched which indicates potential reputational risk (see also watching eye effect).

The ability to perceive social signals and integrate them into judgements about others' intentional mental states (e.g. beliefs, desires, emotions, knowledge) is often referred to as theory of mind or mentalization, and is evident from about 18 months of age.

Processing and decoding social cues is an important part of everyday human interaction (e.g. turn-taking in conversation), and therefore a critical skill for communication and social understanding. Taking into account other people's internal states such as thoughts or emotions is a critical part of forming and maintaining relationships. The social monitoring system attunes individuals to external information regarding social approval and disapproval by increasing interpersonal sensitivity, the "attention to and accuracy in decoding interpersonal social cues" relevant to gaining inclusion. Being able to accurately detect both positive and negative cues allows one to behave adaptively and avoid future rejection, which therefore produces greater social inclusion. High need for social inclusion due to situational events (e.g. rejection) activates higher social monitoring; and individuals that generally experience greater belonging needs are associated with greater interpersonal sensitivity. However, this mechanism should not be confused with rejection sensitivity—a bias that decodes ambiguous social cues as signs of rejection.

Under-developed awareness of social cues can make interaction in social situations challenging. There are various mental disorders that impair this ability, and therefore make effective communication as well as forming relationships with others difficult for the affected person. Additionally, research shows that older adults have difficulties in extracting and decoding social cues from the environment, especially those about human agency and intentionality. Children rely more on social cues than adults as children use them in order to comprehend and learn about their surroundings.

== Mechanisms ==
Recent work done in the field studying social cues has found that perception of social cues is best defined as the combination of multiple cues and processing streams, also referred to as cue integration. Stimuli are processed through experience sharing and mentalizing and the likelihood of the other person's internal state is inferred by the Bayesian logic. Experience sharing is a person's tendency to take on another person's facial expressions, posture and internal state and is often related to the area of empathy. A stimulus that is perceptually salient can cause a person to automatically use a bottom-up approach or cognitive top-down intentions or goals. This causes one to move in a controlled and calculated manner. A peripheral cue is used to measure spatial cuing, which does not give away information about a target's location. Naturally, only the most relevant contextual cues are processed and this occurs extremely fast (around 100–200 milliseconds). This type of fast, automating processing is often referred to as intuition and allows us to integrate complex multi-dimensional cues and generate suitable behaviour in real time. Cognitive learning models illustrate how people connect cues with certain outcomes or responses. Learning can strengthen associations between predictive cues and outcomes and weaken the link between nondescriptive cues and outcomes. Two aspects of the EXIT model learning phenomena have been focused on by Collins et al. The first is blocking which happens when a new cue is introduced with a cue that already has meaning. The second is highlighting which happens when an individual pays close attention to a cue that will change the meaning of a cue that they already know. When a new cue is added along with a previous one it is said that individuals only focus on the new cue to gain a better understanding as to what is going on.

=== Brain regions involved in processing ===
Benjamin Straube, Antonia Green, Andreas Jansen, Anjan Chatterjee, and Tilo Kircher found that social cues influence the neural processing of speech-gesture utterances. Past studies have focused on mentalizing as being a part of perception of social cues and it is believed that this process relies on the neural system, which consists of the:

- Paracingulate cortex
- Temporal poles
- Superior temporal sulcus

When people focus on things in a social context, the medial prefrontal cortex and precuneus areas of the brain are activated; however, when people focus on a non-social context there is no activation of these areas. Straube et al. hypothesized that the areas of the brain involved in mental processes were mainly responsible for social cue processing. It is believed that when iconic gestures are involved, the left temporal and occipital regions would be activated and when emblematic gestures were involved the temporal poles would be activated. When it came to abstract speech and gestures, the left frontal gyrus would be activated according to Straube et al. After conducting an experiment on how body position, speech and gestures affected activation in different areas of the brain Straube et al. came to the following conclusions:

1. When a person is facing someone head on the occipital, inferior frontal, medial frontal, right anterior temporal and left hemispheric parietal cortex were activated.
2. When participants watched an actor who was delivering a speech talking about another person an extended network of bilateral temporal and frontal regions were activated.
3. When participants watched an actor who talked about objects and made iconic gestures the occipito-temporal and parietal brain areas were activated. The conclusion that Straube et al. reached was that speech-gesture information is effected by context-dependent social cues.

The amygdala, fusiform gyrus, insula, and superior and middle temporal regions have been identified as areas in the brain that play a role in visual emotional cues. It was found that there was greater activation in the bilateral anterior superior temporal gyrus and bilateral fusiform gyrus when it came to emotional stimuli. The amygdala has been connected with the automatic evaluation of threat, facial valence information, and trustworthiness of faces.

When it comes to visual cues, individuals follow the gaze of others to find out what they are looking at. It has been found that this response is evolutionarily adaptive due to the fact that it can alert others to happenings in the environment. Almost 50% of the time, peripheral cues have a hard time finding the location of a target. Studies have shown that directed gaze impacts attentional orienting in a seemingly automatic manner. Part of the brain that is involved when another person averts their gaze is also a part of attentional orienting. Past researchers have found that arrow cues are linked to the fronto-parietal areas, whereas arrow and gaze cues were linked to occipito-temporal areas. Therefore, gaze cues may indeed rely on automatic processes more than arrow cues. The importance of eye gaze has increased in importance throughout the evolutionary time period.

Higher level visual regions, such as the fusiform gyrus, extrastriate cortex and superior temporal sulcus (STS) are the areas of the brain which studies have found to link to perceptual processing of social/biological stimuli. Behavioral studies have found that the right hemisphere is highly connected with the processing of left visual field advantage for face and gaze stimuli. Researchers believe the right STS is also involved in using gaze to understand the intentions of others. While looking at social and nonsocial cues, it has been found that a high level of activity has been found in the bilateral extrastriate cortices in regards to gaze cues versus peripheral cues. There was a study done on two people with split-brain, in order to study each hemisphere to see what their involvement is in gaze cuing. Results suggest that gaze cues show a strong effect with the facial recognition hemisphere of the brain, compared to nonsocial cues. The results of Greene and Zaidel's study suggest that in relation to visual fields, information is processed independently and that the right hemisphere shows greater orienting.

Pertaining to emotional expression the superior temporal cortex has been shown to be active during studies focusing on facial perception. However, when it comes to face identity the inferior temporal and fusiform cortex is active. During facial processing the amygdala and fusiform gyrus show a strong functional connection. Face identification can be impaired if there is damage to the orbitofrontal cortex (OFC). The amygdala is active during facial expressions and it improves long-term memory for long term emotional stimuli. It has also been found that there are face response neurons in the amygdala. The connection between the amygdala, OFC, and other medial temporal lobe structures suggest that they play an important role in working memory for social cues. Systems which are critical in perceptually identifying and processing emotion and identity need to cooperate in order to maintain maintenance of social cues.

In order to monitor changing facial expressions of individuals, the hippocampus and orbitofrontal cortex may be a crucial part in guiding critical real-world social behavior in social gatherings. The hippocampus may well be a part of using social cues to understand numerous appearances of the same person over short delay periods. The orbitofrontal cortex being important in the processing of social cues leads researchers to believe that it works with the hippocampus to create, maintain, and retrieve corresponding representations of the same individual seen with multiple facial expressions in working memory. After coming across the same person multiple times with different social cues, the right lateral orbitofrontal cortex and hippocampus are more strongly employed and display a stronger functional connection when disambiguating each encounter with that individual. During an fMRI scan the lateral orbitofrontal cortex, hippocampus, fusiform gyrus bilaterally showed activation after meeting the same person again and having previously seen two different social cues. This would suggest that both of these brain areas help retrieve correct information about a person's last encounter with the person. The ability to separate the different encounters with different people seen with different social cues leads researchers to believe that it permits for suitable social interactions. Ross, LoPresti and Schon offer that the orbitofrontal cortex and hippocampus are a part of both working memory and long-term memory, which permits flexibility in encoding separate representations of an individual in the varying social contexts in which we encounter them.

Oxytocin has been named "the social hormone". Research done on rats provide strong evidence that social contact enhances oxytocin levels in the brain which then sets the stage for social bonds. In recent years it has been found that inhaling oxytocin through the nasal passage increases trust toward strangers and increases a person's ability to perceive social cues. Activation of face-induced amygdala was found to be increased by oxytocin in women. There have been findings that oxytocin increases occurrence of attention shifts to the eye region of a face which suggests that it alters the readiness of the brain to socially meaningful stimuli. Dopamine neurons from the ventral tegmental area code the salience of social as well as nonsocial stimuli. Bartz et al. found that the effects of oxytocin are person-dependent, meaning that every individual will be affected differently by oxytocin, especially those who have trouble in social situations. Research done by Groppe et al. supports that motivational salience of social cues is enhanced by oxytocin. Oxytocin has been found to influence responses to cues that are socially relevant.

== Examples ==
=== Nonverbal cues ===
==== Roles of nonverbal cues ====
Nonverbal communication is any sort of communication based on facial expressions, body language, and any vocal communication that does not use words. Nonverbal cues consist of anything you do with your face, body or nonlinguistic voice that others can and may respond to. The main role of nonverbal cues is communication. These types of cues can help us connect with others and communicate emotions, moods, instructions, and many other things based on facial cues, motion cues and body language. Understanding and using nonverbal cues can also help people not only in day-to-day life but in situations such as interviews, leadership roles, service roles, educational roles and more.

==== Facial cues ====
Facial expressions are signals that we make by moving our facial muscles on our face. Facial expressions generally signify an emotional state, and each emotional state or state of mind has a specific facial expression, many of which are universally used around the world. Without seeing someone's facial expression, one would not be able to see if the other person is crying, happy, angry, etc. Furthermore, facial expressions enable us to further comprehend what is going on during situations that are very difficult or confusing.

Facial cues do not only refer to explicit expressions but also include facial appearance. There is a wealth of information that people gather simply from a person's face in the blink of an eye, such as gender, emotion, physical attractiveness, competence, threat level and trustworthiness. One of the most highly developed skills that humans have is facial perception. A person's face allows others to gain information about that person, which is helpful when it comes to social interaction. The fusiform face area of the human brain plays a large role in face perception and recognition; however, it does not provide useful information for processing emotion recognition, emotional tone, shared attention, impulsive activation of person knowledge and trait implications based on facial appearance.

The fallacy of making inferences about people's personality traits from their facial appearance is referred to as overgeneralization effect. For instance, baby face overgeneralization produces the biased perception that people whose facial features resemble those of children have childlike traits (e.g. weakness, honesty, need to be protected), and an attractive face leads to judgements that the attractive person possesses positive personality traits such as social competency, intelligence, and health. It is mainly facial features which resemble low fitness (anomalous face overgeneralization), age (baby face overgeneralization), emotion (emotion face overgeneralization) or a particular identity (familiar face overgeneralization) that affect impression formation; even a trace of these qualities can lead to such a response. These effects are prevalent in spite of a general awareness that those impressions most likely do not represent a person's true character.

An important tool for communication in social interactions are the eyes. Gaze cues are the most informative social stimulus as they are able to convey basic emotions (e.g. sadness, fear) and reveal a lot about a person's social attention. Infants that are already 12 months old respond to the gaze of adults, which indicates that the eyes are an important way to communicate, even before spoken language is developed. Eye gaze direction conveys a person's social attention; and eye contact can guide and capture attention as well as act as a signal of attraction. People must detect and orient to people's eyes in order to utilize and follow gaze cues. People may use gaze following because they want to avoid social interactions. Past experiments have found that a person is more likely to look at a speaker's face when the speaker uses direct eye contact during real-time communication (e.g., conversing via live video) versus taped recordings. Individuals use gaze following and seeking to provide information for gaze cuing when information is not provided in a verbal manner. However, people do not seek gaze cues when they are not provided or when spoken instructions contain all of the relevant information.

==== Motion cues ====
Body language and body posture are other social cues that we use to interpret how someone else is feeling. Other than facial expressions, body language and posture are the main non-verbal social cues that we use. For instance, body language can be used to establish personal space, which is the amount of space needed for oneself in order to be comfortable. Taking a step back can therefore be a social cue indicating a violation of personal space.

People pay attention to motion cues even with other visual cues (e.g. facial expression) present. Already brief displays of body motion can influence social judgements or inferences regarding a person's personality, mating behaviour, and attractiveness. For example, a high amplitude of motion might indicate extraversion and vertical movements might form an impression of aggression.

Gestures are specific motions that one makes with the hands in order to further communicate a message. Certain gestures such as pointing gestures, can help direct people's focus to what is going on around them that is important. Not only does using gestures help the speaker to better process what they are saying, but it also helps the listener to better comprehend what the speaker is saying.

== Use of social cues during early childhood ==
From a young age people are taught to use the social cues of others to gain insight about the world around them. There is also evidence that reliance on social cues is a naturally occurring tendency.

Research has found that from birth, babies prefer infant directed speech over adult directed speech. At as young as 6 months old, babies prefer someone that has previously talked to them and who speaks their native language, over someone who speaks a foreign language. According to Guellai and Steri, at 9 weeks old, babies fixate more on an adult's eye region when the adult is talking to them, than when the adult is silent and looking at them. Guellai and Steri concluded that at birth, babies are able to read two forms of social cues: eye gaze and voice.

When children use and interpret different signs and symbols to communicate with an adult, they use social cues such as eye gaze and engaging facial expressions to understand the adult's intentions. Leekam, Soloman and Teoh hypothesized that children would pay more attention to a task if the adult had an engaging facial expression. They tested their hypothesis on 2 and 3 year olds using three signs: a pointer finger, a replica and an arrow. Their first experiment supported their hypothesis. An important social cue that helps children comprehend the function and meaning of a sign or symbol is an engaging facial expression. During the difficult tasks of the study involving unfamiliar symbols, children looked more for social cues. They also found that young children understood the purpose behind the symbol or sign better in the presence of an engaging face. However, when no face was visible, performance on the tasks significantly declined, especially for tasks involving unfamiliar symbols and signs. Leekam et al. state that it is possible that children understood the significance of the pointing sign due to their familiarity with it; children as young as 12 months old begin to comprehend and use pointing as a gesture. The researchers concluded that it is easier for children as young as 7 months old to identify an action carried out by a bare hand than to understand the intent behind an action of a gloved hand.

According to studies conducted on social referencing, infants use the emotional cues of others to guide their behavior. In a visual cliff study conducted by Vaish and Striano, infants were left on the shallow end of a plexiglass cliff with their mothers on the other end. The mothers used either facial and vocal cues, facial cues only, or vocal cues only to beckon their child forward. The study showed that infants crossed over faster in response to vocal-only cues than facial-only cues. The authors suggest the reason infants do this is because they are accustomed to vocal-only cues from their parents.

In past studies, it has been found that infants use social cues to help them learn new words, especially when there are multiple objects present. Most studies have used two or more objects simultaneously to test if infants could learn if they paid attention to the cues presented. At 14 months old, infants followed an adult's gaze to an object, indicating that they believe that the eyes are important for looking. Head turning and gaze are other gazes that infants view as referential cues. At around 18 months old, social cues become beneficial to infants, though they are not always useful. Young infants rely on attentional cues while older infants rely more on social cues to help them learn things. However, it was found that 12-month-old infants could not use cues such as eye gaze, touching, and handling to learn labels. Research shows that 15-month-old infants are sensitive to gaze direction directed by adults and are able to correctly use these cues to help with referent novel words.

Young children receive social cues from adults and determine how they should behave based upon these cues. Smith and LaFreniere mention recursive awareness of intentionality (RAI), which is the understanding of how the cues one provides will influence the beliefs and actions of those receiving them. RAI is absent in children under the age of 5, but develops during middle childhood. They tested to see if children of ages 4, 6, and 8 were able to read the intentions of their partner in a game through both nonverbal hints and facial expressions. They found that 8-year-olds were better able to read their partner's cues and based their decisions off those cues.

=== In school ===
In the classroom, there is a development of cues between the teacher and student. Classrooms develop their own ways of talking and communicating information. Once a set of verbal and nonverbal behaviors takes place in a classroom on a consistent basis, it becomes a norm or set of rules within the classroom. The following cues are nonverbal indications that give way to certain norms in the classroom:

- pitch
- stress
- inflection

Teachers and students develop ways of understanding the way the other party thinks, believes, acts and perceives things. A teacher can use the gaze of their eyes and the position of their body to indicate where the student's attention should be held. Sometimes when students are stuck in a previous discussion or cannot determine an appropriate response to the current topic, it could mean that they did not correctly perceive the cues that the teacher was displaying. Both students and teachers must read the classroom cues to gather what is going on, if and how they are supposed to be doing something, and the reasoning underlying actions.

== Impairments in psychological disorders ==
Accurately interpreting social cues is a vital part of normal social function. However, individuals with certain psychological disorders, including autism, schizophrenia, social anxiety disorder and ADHD, tend to have difficulties in interpreting and using these cues.

=== Autism spectrum disorder ===
Autistic individuals often have trouble reading social cues correctly. Misreading social cues can lead to a person acting out, which can then result in negative interactions and social disapproval. Therefore, social cues are believed to be an important aspect of inclusion and comfort in personal, interpersonal and social environments.

The DSM-V states that autism spectrum disorder is a neurodevelopmental disorder involving persistent deficits in social communication as well as repetitive and restricted behaviors. These deficits must be clinically impairing and present since childhood.

1. Persistent deficits in social communication and social interaction across multiple contexts, as manifested by the following, currently or by history (must have all three):
  - deficits in social-emotional reciprocity, ranging, for example, from abnormal social approach and failure of normal back-and-forth conversation; to reduced sharing of interests, emotions, or affect; to failure to initiate or respond to social interactions.
  - deficits in nonverbal communicative behaviors used for social interaction, ranging, for example, from poorly integrated verbal and nonverbal communication; to abnormalities in eye contact and body language or deficits in understanding and use of gestures; to a total lack of facial expressions and nonverbal communication.
  - deficits in developing, maintaining, and understanding relationships, ranging, for example, from difficulties adjusting behavior to suit various social contexts; to difficulties in sharing imaginative play or in making friends; to absence of interest in peers.
2. Restricted, repetitive patterns of behavior, interests, or activities, as manifested by at least two of the following, currently or by history (must have at least two out of four):
  - stereotyped or repetitive motor movements, use of objects, or speech (e.g., simple motor stereotypes, lining up toys or flipping objects, echolalia, idiosyncratic phrases).
  - insistence on sameness, inflexible adherence to routines, or ritualized patterns of verbal or nonverbal behavior (e.g., extreme distress at small changes, difficulties with transitions, rigid thinking patterns, greeting rituals, need to take same route or eat same food every day).
  - highly restricted, fixated interests that are abnormal in intensity or focus (e.g., strong attachment to or preoccupation with unusual objects, excessively circumscribed or perseverative interests).
  - hyper- or hyporeactivity to sensory input or unusual interest in sensory aspects of the environment (e.g. apparent indifference to pain/temperature, adverse response to specific sounds or textures, excessive smelling or touching of objects, visual fascination with lights or movement).

The main social cue impairments of those on the autism spectrum include interpreting facial expressions, understanding body language, and deciphering gaze direction. All three of these cues are classified under the nonverbal communication category. However, research has found that autistic children and adults have no difficulty in identifying human bodily movements or body language that is used in everyday and normal activities. The aspect that autistic people have trouble with is moreso the ability that is needed to verbally describe the emotions that are connected with these types of bodily movements.

Children who are not autistic learn to relate the body movements that they see with the emotions and mental states of others when they have face to face interactions with other children. Having face to face interactions with other people helps children increase their knowledge of what these body movements represent. After seeing these representations being used multiple times, children are then able to make inferences about the representations and the people making them. Thus, the children will be able to make assumptions about a person that they interact with in the future, since they already understand what body movements or body language represents.

=== Schizophrenia ===
According to the Diagnostic and Statistical Manual of Mental Disorders (DSM), schizophrenia is a psychological disorder, which has to include two out of the five symptoms listed below:

1. delusions
2. hallucinations
3. disorganized speech
4. grossly disorganized or catatonic behavior
5. negative symptoms: affective flattening, alogia, or avolition

Schizophrenic people find it hard to pick up on social cues. More specifically, people with schizophrenia are found to have deficits in emotional facial recognition, social knowledge, empathy, and non-verbal cues, and emotional processing. Most of these aspects are part of a category called social cognition. However, most tasks that are related to social cognition involve emotional processing, empathy, and social norms knowledge. When dealing with facial expression recognition, recent research has found that people with this disorder are unable to recognize facial expressions that exhibit negative emotions, including fear, sadness, anger, and disgust. As a result, schizophrenic people have trouble comprehending situations that involve different types of empathy, especially situations that require empathy for pain.

In addition, research has found that those with schizophrenia are more likely to make additional false positives when aspects of the task are more abstract. A false positive is made whenever a participant mistakenly believes that they observed a specific social cue in the vignette shown to them. Therefore, the social cue that they believe they saw happening in the video was nonexistent. To see whether someone is able to correctly identify both types of cues, researchers use the Social Cue Recognition Test (SCRT). When the task is defined as being too abstract, this means that it contains abstract cues, which are cues that can be inferred from a social setting. This would consist of actions and situations that contain affect, goals, and rules. Thus, people with schizophrenia have trouble making inferences about social situations and settings that deal with abstract aspects. On the other hand, schizophrenic people are better at identifying features that use concrete cues, which are cues that can be observed directly. The reason for this is because concrete clues are more apparent while abstract cues are more ambiguous.

=== Social anxiety ===
Social anxiety disorder, also known as social phobia, is a disorder that the DSM identifies as someone who experiences some of the following:

- persistent fear of one or more social or performance related situations in which the person with the fear is exposed to people that are unfamiliar
- constantly fears being humiliated, embarrassed, and/or criticized by those unfamiliar people
- when exposed to the feared situation, the person exhibits anxiety that may take the form of a panic attack; in children this could be crying out or a tantrum
- avoids the feared situation at all costs
- the avoidance of the feared situation causes one to be in distress which causes a significant interference with the person's normal routine, relationships, and functioning in either school or work.

People with social anxiety disorder are found to be overly concerned with the disapproval and approval of others around them. Due to this obsession with what others think of them, people with this disorder tend to interact with few or no people at all. As a result, they do not get an appropriate amount of social interaction, which contributes to their deficit in interpreting emotions and facial expressions. More specifically, people with social anxiety disorder tend to have a negative bias towards both facial expressions and emotions, which leads them to interpret such cues that are normal and/or happy as being negative. Previous research has found that because people with this disorder tend to have a negative bias towards social cues, they take longer to process and comprehend social cues that represent happiness.

=== ADHD ===
ADHD stands for attention deficit/hyperactivity disorder, which is a psychological disorder that most commonly exists in children and adults that also have learning disabilities.

It has been found that children who have both ADHD and a learning disability also have trouble comprehending social cues, have poor social skills, have difficulty creating and/or maintaining friendships, and have trouble reacting to other people's thoughts and feelings. However, part of the reason that children with ADHD have deficits in the social realm is their lack of focus and self control, which obstructs their ability to properly interpret social cues.

More specifically, people with ADHD tend to focus on too many cues, which disables them from interpreting which cues are more important. Because of this, certain social situations are especially hard for people with ADHD to interpret. One situation that would meet this criterion would be when someone is being deceptive towards them. The reason a deceptive situation would be harder for some with this disorder is because the social cues one gives off when being deceptive are very subtle. Since people with ADHD already have trouble interpreting social cues, subtle social cues would be even more difficult for them to comprehend and interpret.

However, many studies have found that people with ADHD that take stimulants or prescribed medication for ADHD are better able to interpret which social cues are of the most importance. As a result, they are better at interacting and communicating with others, which then enables them to make and maintain better friendships or relationships.

== In Internet communication ==
Communication on the Internet is very different from communication with others in person. McKenna and Bargh identified four main differences between face-to-face communication and communication that takes place on the internet.

These four differences are:

1. anonymity
2. physical distance
3. physical appearance
4. time

Anonymity is a major feature that internet communication can provide. When communicating through email, for example, neither person can see the other's face. This can be a very positive feature for those that are socially anxious or have a social anxiety disorder because it eliminates the possibility of being publicly humiliated or embarrassed, which is something that most people who are socially anxious are very worried about. As a result, people with social anxiety are more inclined to open up, allowing them to get closer to and form more relationships with others.

On the other hand, being anonymous can cause deindividuation, which is when one is no longer an individual, but rather just seen as being part of a group. In other words, it is when one can feel like they are just one person among a thousand others, and because of this, they are not as noticeable. This has been found to cause some people to behave more impulsively and have less self-monitoring. This type of behavior and thinking can cause one to be more blunt and aggressive towards the people that they are communicating with. However, the blunt and aggressive responses can also be due to the fact that the person is not communicating with the other person face to face. However, others have suggested that whether or not the reduced availability of social cues results in negative behavior may depend upon the situation and the individual's goals.

Unlike with face-to-face communication, physical distance and proximity are not barriers to communicating on the Internet. The Internet allows people from all over the world to come together and interact with each other. No matter what city or country one lives in, one is able to communicate or interact with anyone around the world who is also on the Internet. As a result, people are able to make friends and communicate with others that they normally would not have been able to due to physical distance. Furthermore, people are enabled to communicate and stay in contact with their family and friends that may live too far away to visit on a regular basis.

As with physical distance, time is a feature that does not matter when one is communicating on the internet. For instance, people are able to communicate with others even if the person(s) they are communicating with is not online at the same moment. One way this is done is through the process of email. By communicating through email, one is able to send another person a message at any time. Using email also allows one to think about what they would like to say and edit one's response before sending it. Furthermore, when one receives an email, they do not have to respond right away; there is no time constraint on when one must respond.

Along with proximity and time, physical appearance is another factor about the internet that is of no importance. People are unable to see the physical characteristics of the person or persons that they are interacting with on the internet. This sets the condition for the possibility for people to talk to others that they normally would not if they were seeing the person face-to-face. So, people can connect on a more meaningful level and create closer relationships, physical attraction notwithstanding. This is also considered to be a very positive aspect about the internet.

A positive feature of the internet is that it hosts millions of different chat rooms and blogs that allow people to communicate with others who share the same interests and values. Not only does this enable people to find others who are similar to them, but it also allows people to find emotional support. However, the ability for people to connect with like-minded others online also has negative implications. One negative feature is that it allows people to come together and talk about subjects such as murder; and another is the organization of hate groups.

The absence of certain social cues online can lead to more misunderstandings than if the communication was occurring face-to-face. For example, when reading an email, people are unable to hear the sender's voice or see the sender's facial expression; both voice and facial expressions are important social cues that allow one to understand how someone else is feeling, and without them, one can be more prone to misinterpret what someone is conveying in an email.
