= Analog observation =

Research tool

Analog observation is, in contrast to naturalistic observation, a research tool by which a subject is observed in an artificial setting. Typically, types of settings in which analog observation is utilized include clinical offices or research laboratories, but, by definition, analog observations can be made in any artificial environment, even if the environment is one which the subject is likely to encounter naturally.

== Applications ==
Analog observation is typically divided into two iteration of application: The first iteration primarily studies the effect of manipulation of variables in the subject's environment, including setting and events, on the subject's behavior. The second iteration primarily seeks to observe the subject's behavior in quasi-experimental social situations.

== See also ==
- Psychological research
- Psychological research methods
- Naturalistic observation
- Observational study
