= Novelty =

Quality of being new

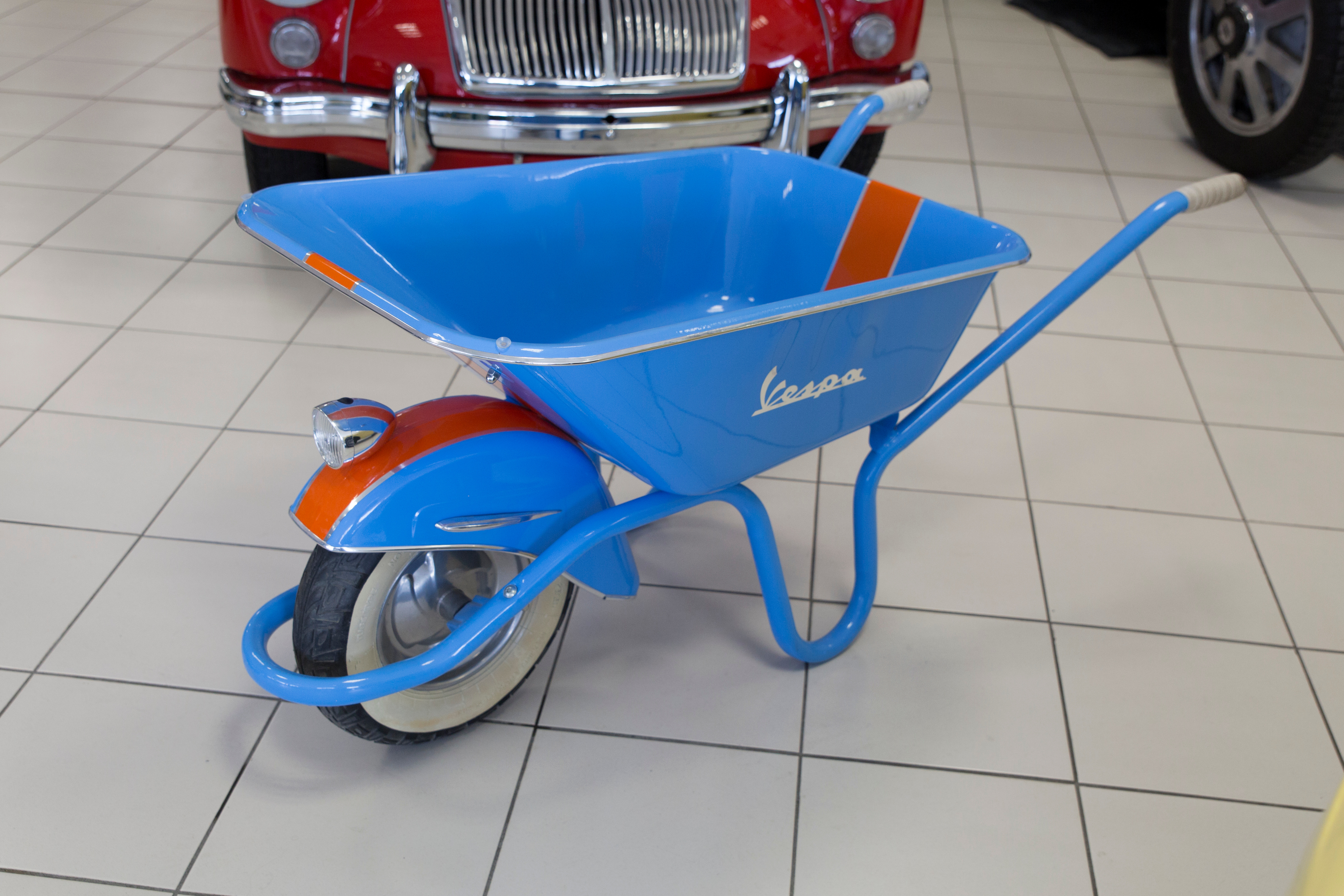
A novelty wheelbarrow created to resemble a Vespa scooter. The decorative fender and headlamp serve little practical purpose.

Novelty (derived from Latin word novus for "new") is the quality of being new, or following from that, of being striking, original or unusual. Novelty may be the shared experience of a new cultural phenomenon or the subjective perception of an individual.

From the meaning of being unusual, usage is derived the concept of the novelty dance (a type of dance that is popular for being unusual or humorous); the novelty song (a musical item that capitalizes on something new, unusual, or a current fad); the novelty show (a competition or display in which exhibits or specimens are in way some novel); and novelty architecture (a building or other structure that is interesting because it has an amusing design). It is also this sense that applies to a novelty item, a small manufactured adornment, toy or collectible. These, in turn are often used as promotional merchandise in marketing. The chess term novelty is used for a move in chess which has never been played before in a recorded game.

The term can have pejorative sense and refer to a mere innovation. However, novelty in patent law is part of the legal test to determine whether an invention is patentable. A novelty effect is the tendency for performance to initially improve when new technology is instituted.

== See also ==
- Creativity
- Innovation
- Interest (emotion)
- Invention
- Novelty theory
- One-hit wonder
