= Natural observation =

Natural observation may refer to:

- Observational study
- Naturalistic observation
- Self-observation
