= Colorado's 54th House of Representatives district =

American legislative district

Colorado's 54th State House of Representatives district
Representative
Matt Soper; R–Delta
- Demographics: 79% White; 0% Black; 15% Hispanic; 0% Asian; 0% Native American; 4% Multiracial
- Population (2024): 91,562

Colorado's 54th House of Representatives district is one of 65 districts in the Colorado House of Representatives. It has been represented by Matt Soper since 2019.

== Members ==
- Matt Soper
- Jason Bias
