= Observer-expectancy effect =

Cognitive bias of experimental subject

The observer-expectancy effect (Note: Also called the experimenter-expectancy effect, expectancy bias, observer effect, or experimenter effect.) is a form of reactivity in which a researcher's cognitive bias causes them to subconsciously influence the participants of an experiment. Confirmation bias can lead to the experimenter interpreting results incorrectly because of the tendency to look for information that affirms their hypothesis, and overlook information that conflicts with it. It is a significant threat to a study's internal validity, and is therefore typically controlled using a double-blind experimental design.

The observer-expectancy effect is distinct from related phenomena such as the subject-expectancy effect and demand characteristics. In observer-expectancy effects, the researcher’s expectations influence participant behavior or data interpretation through subtle cues, whereas subject-expectancy effects arise from participants’ own beliefs about the study, and demand characteristics refer more broadly to situational cues that signal expected responses.

It may include conscious or unconscious influences on subject behavior including creation of demand characteristics that influence subjects, and altered or selective recording of experimental results themselves.

== Overview ==
The experimenter may introduce cognitive bias into a study in several ways—in the observer-expectancy effect, the experimenter may subtly communicate their expectations for the outcome of the study to the participants, causing them to alter their behavior to conform to those expectations. Such observer bias effects are near-universal in human data interpretation under expectation and in the presence of imperfect cultural and methodological norms that promote or enforce objectivity.

The classic example of experimenter bias is that of "Clever Hans", an Orlov Trotter horse claimed by his owner von Osten to be able to do arithmetic and other tasks. As a result of the large public interest in Clever Hans, philosopher and psychologist Carl Stumpf, along with his assistant Oskar Pfungst, investigated these claims. Ruling out simple fraud, Pfungst determined that the horse could answer correctly even when von Osten did not ask the questions. However, the horse was unable to answer correctly when either it could not see the questioner, or if the questioner themselves was unaware of the correct answer: When von Osten knew the answers to the questions, Hans answered correctly 89% of the time. However, when von Osten did not know the answers, Hans guessed only 6% of questions correctly. Pfungst then proceeded to examine the behaviour of the questioner in detail, and showed that as the horse's taps approached the right answer, the questioner's posture and facial expression changed in ways that were consistent with an increase in tension, which was released when the horse made the final, correct tap. This provided a cue that the horse had learned to use as a reinforced cue to stop tapping.

Experimenter-bias also influences human subjects. As an example, researchers compared performance of two groups given the same task (rating portrait pictures and estimating how successful each individual was on a scale of −10 to 10), but with different experimenter expectations. In one group, ("Group A"), experimenters were told to expect positive ratings while in another group, ("Group B"), experimenters were told to expect negative ratings. Data collected from Group A was a significant and substantially more optimistic appraisal than the data collected from Group B. The researchers suggested that experimenters gave subtle but clear cues with which the subjects complied.

== Prevention ==
Double blind techniques may be employed to combat bias by causing the experimenter and subject to be ignorant of which condition data flows from.

In addition to double-blind designs, contemporary research practices recommend further safeguards to reduce observer-expectancy effects. These include preregistration of study hypotheses and analysis plans, the use of registered reports in which study protocols are peer-reviewed prior to data collection, automation of data collection and outcome measurement to limit researcher influence, and blinded data analysis, where analysts remain unaware of experimental conditions until analyses are complete.

It might be thought that, due to the central limit theorem of statistics, collecting more independent measurements will improve the precision of estimates, thus decreasing bias. However, this assumes that the measurements are statistically independent. In the case of experimenter bias, the measures share correlated bias: simply averaging such data will not lead to a better statistic but may merely reflect the correlations among the individual measurements and their non-independent nature.

Concerns about observer-expectancy effects remain relevant in contemporary discussions of research methodology and reproducibility. Modern analyses of scientific reliability have emphasized that undisclosed flexibility in data collection, measurement, and analysis can allow researcher expectations to influence study outcomes, reinforcing the importance of methodological safeguards designed to minimize bias. Initiatives promoting transparency, preregistration, and standardized reporting have been proposed in part to reduce such risks and improve reproducibility across scientific fields.

== See also ==
- Observer effect (disambiguation)
- Expectancy effect (disambiguation)

== See also ==
- List of cognitive biases
- Allegiance bias
- Cultural bias
- Demand characteristics
- Epistemic feedback
- Funding bias
- Hawthorne effect
- N rays – imaginary radiation
- Naturalistic observation
- Observer bias
- Participant observer
- Placebo and Nocebo
- Publication bias
- Pygmalion effect – teachers who expect higher achievement from some children actually get it
- Reality tunnel
- Reflexivity (social theory)
- Subject-expectancy effect
- Systematic bias
- White-hat bias
