= Epistemic feedback =

Process of feedback

The term "epistemic feedback" is a form of feedback which refers to an interplay between what is being observed (or measured) and the result of the observation. The concept can apply to a process to obtain information, where the process itself changes the information when being obtained. For example, instead of quietly asking customers for their opinions about food in a restaurant, making an announcement about food quality, as being tested in a survey, could cause cooks to focus on producing high-quality results. The concept can also apply to changing the method of observation, rather than affecting the data. For example, if after asking several customers about food, they noted the food as generally good or fair, then the questions might be changed to ask more specifically which food items were most/least liked. Hence, the interplay can alter either the observations, or the method of observation, or both.

== Viewing negative or positive effects ==
The effects of epistemic feedback can be viewed as either negative or positive depending on the goal of the observations. When trying to get a secret survey of results, epistemic feedback can be seen as a negative factor which distorts the original data. However if the goal is to improve quality, then epistemic feedback could be a positive factor to periodically report areas which need improvement. The risk comes when the feedback temporarily slants the evaluation of quality so that long-term performance is hindered by distortion in the way results were measured.

== Methods to compensate for feedback ==
Some methods to compensate for epistemic feedback are to use a "double-blind study" or to conduct secret surveys to quietly check the results. Also, "controlled experiments" can be used, where the outcome is adjusted for the placebo effect of reactions to unchanged parameters. Additionally, longitudinal studies, re-assessing the results over a long period of time, can reduce the impact of short-term feedback on the observed results.

== See also ==
- Reactivity (psychology)
- Self-determination theory
- Motivation
- Experimenter effect
- Observer-expectancy effect
- Reflexivity (social theory)
- Pygmalion effect
- Placebo effect
- Novelty effect
