= Matt Soper =

Politician from Colorado, United States

Matthew Soper
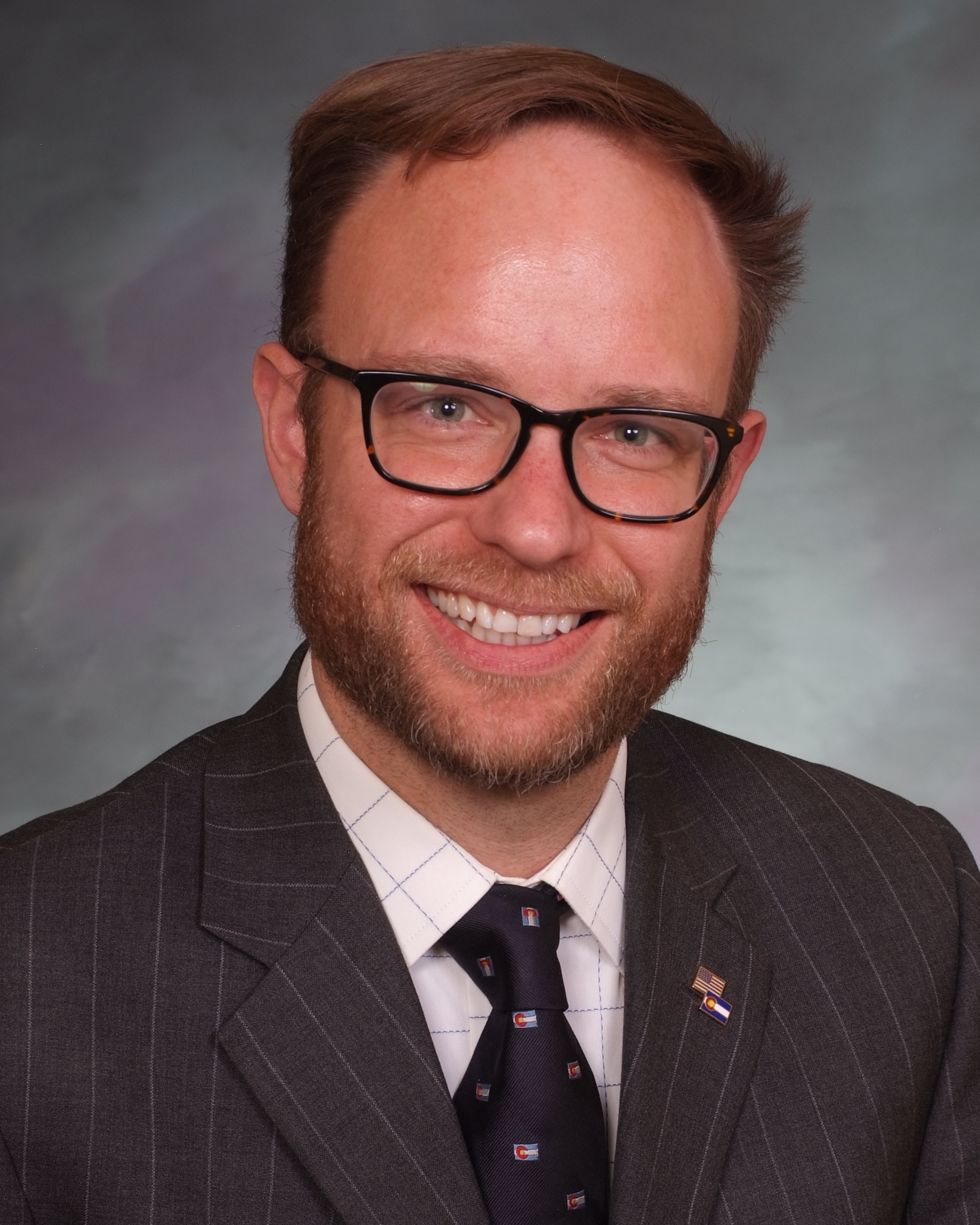

Member of the Colorado House of Representatives from the 54th district
- Incumbent
- Assumed office January 4, 2019
- Preceded by: Yeulin Willett
- Succeeded by: Jason Bias (elect)

Personal details
- Born: Delta, Colorado
- Party: Republican
- Education: Colorado Mesa University (BA); University of Edinburgh (LL.B, LL.M.); University of New Hampshire (LL.M)
- Profession: Businessman; Professional researcher and writer
- Website: www.electmattsoper.com

Matthew Soper (born 1984) is a Republican politician who represents Colorado House of Representatives District 54, which encompasses parts of Mesa and Delta counties on Colorado's Western Slope. In 2026, Soper announced his candidacy for the open seat on the Delta County Board of County Commissioners.

== Background ==
Soper holds a bachelor's degree in Political Science from Colorado Mesa University, an LL.B. in British Law and an LL.M. in Public International Law from the University of Edinburgh School of Law, and an LL.M. in Intellectual Property Law from the University of New Hampshire School of Law. He runs a research and writing business called Oxford Strategies, LLC.

== Elections ==
=== 2018 ===
Soper ran unopposed in the Republican primary to replace retiring incumbent Yeulin Willett. He defeated Independent candidate Thea Chase in the general election with 66.01% of the vote.

=== 2020 ===
Soper ran unopposed in the Republican primary. He defeated Democratic nominee AliceMarie Slaven-Emond in the general election with 74.44% of the vote.

=== 2022 ===
In the 2022 Colorado House of Representatives general election, Soper defeated his Democratic Party opponent, winning 73.80% of the total votes cast.

=== 2024 ===
Soper ran for re-election in 2024. In the Republican primary election held June 25, 2024, he ran unopposed. In the general election held November 5, 2024, Soper also ran unopposed.

== Residency investigation ==
On candidacy filings during 2018, Soper listed as his address a home owned by his mother. His mother had rented the house to another family since August 2016, but Soper claimed he "had a room" in the house, which the family renting the house denied. After the family shared this discrepancy with the media, Soper's mother evicted them so Soper could reside there. The district attorney conducted an investigation of Soper for unlawful voting, but ultimately determined not to file criminal charges.
