= Expectancy effect =

Expectancy effect may refer to:

- Observer-expectancy effect, when expectations of an observer influences a subject and their outcome
- Subject-expectancy effect, when expectations of a subject influences themselves and their outcome
