= Elton Mayo =

Australian organization theorist (1880-1949)

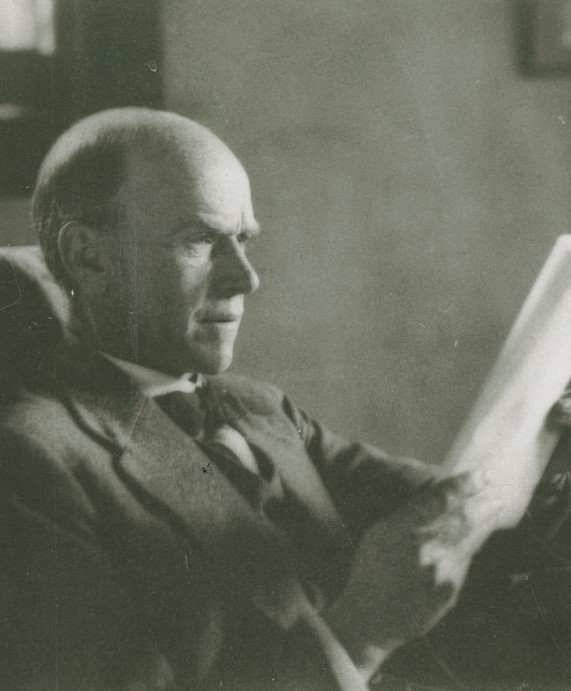
- Elton Mayo c. 1935
- Born: George Elton Mayo; 26 December 1880; Adelaide, Australia
- Died: 7 September 1949 (aged 68); Surrey, UK
- Known for: human relations movement
- Spouse: Dorothea McConnel (m. 1913)
- Children: 2
- Relatives: Helen Mayo (sister); Herbert Mayo (brother); George Mayo (grandfather)

Academic background
- Education: University of Adelaide; University of Edinburgh (attended)

George Elton Mayo (26 December 1880 – 7 September 1949) was an Australian-born psychologist, industrial researcher, and organizational theorist. Mayo was formally trained at the University of Adelaide, acquiring a Bachelor of Arts Degree graduating with First Class Honours, majoring in philosophy and psychology, and was later awarded an honorary Master of Arts Degree from the University of Queensland (UQ).

While in Queensland, Mayo served on the University's war committee and pioneered research into the psychoanalytic treatment of shell-shock. As a psychologist Mayo often helped soldiers returning from World War I recover from the stresses of war and with a Brisbane physician, pioneered the psychoanalytic treatment of shell-shock and conducted psycho-pathological tests. He was a lecturer in psychology and mental philosophy at the UQ between 1911 and 1922, when he sailed to the United States. In 1926 he was appointed to the Harvard Business School (HBS) as a professor of industrial research.

In Philadelphia he conducted research at a textile plant in order to develop a method to reduce the very high rate of turnover in the plant. Mayo's association with the Hawthorne studies as well as his research and work in Australia led to his enjoying a public acclaim granted to few social scientists of his day.

Mayo has been credited with making significant contributions to a number of disciplines, including business management, industrial sociology, philosophy, and social psychology. His field research in industry had a significant impact on industrial and organizational psychology. According to Trahair, Mayo "is known for having established the scientific study of what today is called organizational behavior when he gave close attention to the human, social, and political problems of industrial civilization." (p. 15).

Mayo's work helped to lay the foundation for the human relations movement. He emphasized that alongside the formal organization of an industrial workplace there exists an informal organizational structure as well. Mayo recognized the "inadequacies of existing scientific management approaches" to industrial organizations, and underlined the importance of relationships among people who work for such organizations. His ideas on group relations were advanced in his 1933 book The Human Problems of an Industrialized Civilization, which was based partly on his Hawthorne research.

== Early life and education ==
Mayo was the eldest son of George Gibbes Mayo, a draftsman and later a civil engineer, and his wife, Henrietta Mary Mayo (née Donaldson). His grandfather George Mayo (1807–1894) was a well-known South Australian medical practitioner. Elton attended several schools in Australia (Queen's School, St Peter's College, and the University of Adelaide) and after 1901 attended medical school of University of Edinburgh and in London, neither of which he completed. In 1903 he went to West Africa, and upon returning to London, began writing articles for magazines and teaching English at the Working Men's College. He returned to Adelaide in 1905 to a partnership in the printing firm of J. H. Sherring & Co., but in 1907 he went back to the university to study philosophy and psychology under William Mitchell. He won the Roby Fletcher prize in psychology and graduated with honours (B.A., 1910; M.A., 1926) and was named the David Murray research scholar in scientific studies. In 1911 he became foundation lecturer in mental and moral philosophy at the new University of Queensland and in 1919–23 held the first chair of philosophy there. He moved on to the University of Pennsylvania, but spent the second half of his career at Harvard Business School (1926–1947), where he was professor of industrial research.

Two influences on his career from his time at the University of Queensland were Mayo's friendship with the social anthropologist Bronislaw Malinowski and his work with shell-shock cases returning from the First World War. Malinowski first met Mayo on his way to and from the Trobriand Islands; they became close friends and were regularly in touch until Malinowski's death in 1942. The work with shell-shock soldiers provided a focus for Mayo's interests in clinical psychology and developed his skills in psychotherapy. In this he was strongly influenced by the work on hysteria and obsession of the French psychiatrist, Pierre Janet, who became a critic of Sigmund Freud. For the rest of his working life, Mayo was an active psychotherapist and this practical experience was an important influence on his theoretical and methodological work in America.

== Research ==
One of Mayo's (1924) earliest research efforts involved workers at a Philadelphia textile mill. The mill had been experiencing a high rate of turnover. Mayo believed that the repetitive work in the spinning department gave rise to mental abnormalities in the workers. He found that the introduction of rest periods helped reduce turnover. The research helped make Mayo more widely known in the U.S.

Mayo helped to lay the foundation for the human relations movement, and was known for his industrial research including the Hawthorne Studies and his book The Human Problems of an Industrialized Civilization (1933). The research he conducted under the rubric of the Hawthorne Studies in the late 1920s and early 1930s, underlining the importance of groups in affecting the behaviour of individuals at work.

Elton Mayo laid the ground rules for interviewing, the principles of which have been subsequently repeated in numerous 'how to' books on leadership, coaching and mentoring over the last half century.

=== Hawthorne studies ===
Fritz J. Roethlisberger, Mayo's graduate assistant, and William J. Dickson, head of the Department of Employee Relations at Western Electric, conducted the bulk of the practical research, with Mayo rarely visiting the Hawthorne plant in Cicero, Illinois. Mayo's team carried out a number of "experiments" to look at ways of improving productivity. The research involved manipulating length of rest and lunch periods and piecework payment plans. Mayo concluded that productivity partly depended on the informal social patterns of interaction in the work group.

Mayo, in communicating to business leaders, advanced the idea that managers who understand the nature of informal ties among workers can make decisions for management's benefit. Mayo concluded that people's work performance is dependent on both social relationships and job content. He suggested a tension between workers' "logic of sentiment" and managers' "logic of cost and efficiency" which could lead to conflict within organizations.

Parsons, however, showed that the Hawthorne studies, which were not really experiments, were too confounded to enable researchers to draw firm conclusions. The Hawthorne effect was later named for the phenomenon where people change their behavior when they are aware that they are being observed.

The qualitative aspects of the research suggested that norms of co-operation among workers were related to productivity.

=== The Human Problems of an Industrialized Civilization ===
The books begins with an account of the research on human fatigue and efficiency conducted in the early 20th century.

== Mayo's credentials ==
Although biographers agree about Mayo's contributions, there is no consensus about his credentials. The Encyclopædia Britannica, biographical dictionaries, and some published texts indicate that Mayo was a psychologist. Some authors and critics have discussed Mayo's credentials and his various other job titles during his career in the United States. Cullen does not mention that Mayo was a psychologist although Cullen noted that Mayo let interlocutors call him "Dr. Mayo," letting himself be cast as a Ph.D. in one of the social sciences, without correcting the mistake. Mayo's biographer Trahair wrote, "Mayo was not a psychologist, sociologist, or anthropologist, although sometimes he was cast as such" (p. 357). Trahair also wrote that "after the great war Mayo's reputation grew as a successful academic, clinical psychologist and public speaker" (p. 89). Of course having a reputation as a clinical psychologist does not necessarily make one a clinical psychologist (the public often thinks of psychotherapists, regardless of training, as clinical psychologists or even psychiatrists).

Cullen indicated that Mayo was not a medical doctor, writing that in April 1903, Mayo "enrolled at a small medical school at Saint George's Hospital at London....At this point, Mayo's interest in medicine was all but non-existent" (p. 28). Having dropped out by December 1903, Mayo "wrote home and finally revealed to his family the truth; he did not and could not become a doctor" (p. 28). Miner wrote: "An effective speaker and proficient in cultivating influential friends and mentors, he nevertheless had little by way of academic credentials and practically no training in the conduct of scientific research" (p. 60).

== Criticisms ==
Mayo's contributions to management theory were criticised by intellectual Daniel Bell. Writing in 1947, Bell criticised Mayo and other social scientists for "adjusting men to machines," rather than enlarging human capacity or human freedom. Many, including Reinhard Bendix and Lloyd H. Fisher, criticized Mayo for generalizing his results of the Hawthorne studies. The two state that Mayo's research concerned small, isolated groups, and it was not clear that the conditions and supervision he achieved could have been replicated in large groups and factory settings. His theories are also based upon the assumption that humans, by nature, want to cooperate and form groups, and he never allows for the possibility of José Ortega y Gasset's idea of "the stranger," built upon the proposition that humans, by nature, are suspicious of others. More recently, in 2003, James Hoopes criticised Mayo for "substituting therapy for democracy." Re-analyses of the original Hawthorne data indicate that the quality of the research was poor.

== Family ==
Elton Mayo married Dorothea McConnel on 18 April 1913. Dorothea was the eldest daughter of James Henry McConnel (c. 1850 – 7 June 1914) of Cressbrook Station, Queensland and the sister of Ursula McConnel. They had two daughters:

- Patricia Elton Mayo married Dunstan Curtis. She was a sociologist, author of The Making of a Criminal (1970) and Roots of Identity
- Gael Elton Mayo, better known as Ruth Elton Mayo (1923–1992), British artist and novelist.

The medical doctor Helen Mayo (1878–1967) was his sister, and the Supreme Court judge Sir Herbert Mayo (1885–1972) was his brother.

== Publications ==
- George Elton Mayo: Psychology of Pierre Janet, London: Greenwood Press, 1972; Routledge, reprint edition 2013.
- George Elton Mayo: The Human Problems of an Industrial Civilization, Routledge, reprint edition 2003.
- George Elton Mayo: Critical Evaluations in Business and Management, Ed. John Cunningham Wood, Michael C. Wood, 2004.
- George Elton Mayo: The Social Problems of an Industrial Civilization, Routledge, 2007.

== Sources ==
- J. H. Smith, The Three Faces of Elton Mayo, New Society (December 1980)
- Nikolas Rose. Governing the Soul the Shaping of the Private Self: the shaping of the private self. 2nd ed. London: Free Assoc. Books, 1999.

== Archives ==
- Catalogue of the Mayo papers at the Archives Division of the London School of Economics.
- The Human Relations Movement: Harvard Business School and the Hawthorne Experiments, 1924–1933, at Harvard Business School, Baker Library Historical Collections
- Elton Mayo papers at Baker Library Special Collections, Harvard Business School
