= Quantitative psychological research =

Empirical research method

Quantitative psychological research is psychological research that employs quantitative research methods.

Quantitative research falls under the category of empirical research.

== See also ==
- Statistics
- Quantitative psychology
- Quantitative research
