= Bremen Institute for Applied Beam Technology =

Bremen Institute for Applied Beam Technology Bremer Institut für angewandte Strahltechnik
- Established: 1977
- Staff: approx. 70
- Address: Klagenfurter Straße 5
- Location: Bremen, Hanseatic Bremen, Germany
- Website: www.bias.de

Bremen Institute for Applied Beam Technology (German: Bremer Institut für angewandte Strahltechnik) is a private sector research institute, located in the city of Bremen, Germany. It was founded on July 1, 1977 as a premier laser institute, which was not a part of a university. It was the first of its kind, during that time. The institute was founded by Werner Jüptner and Gerd Sepold.

== Areas of Research ==
The institute focuses its research in the areas of Material Processing and Opto-electronic Systems and Optical Metrology. The departments within the institute are accordingly categorised.

- Materials and modelling
- Optical metrology and testing
- Welding and surface technology
- Industrial applications

== Location ==
The institute is located in the University of Bremen's campus. It can be conveniently reached via the Straßenbahn number 6, alighting at the stop named 'Klagenfurter Straße'. It is about 15 mins via the Straßenbahn to the city centre and 35 mins to the airport.
