= Jason Bias =

American politician

Member-elect of the Colorado House of Representatives from the 54th district
- Assuming office January 2027
- Succeeding: Matt Soper

Personal details
- Party: Republican
- Website: votejasonbias.com

Jason Bias is an American politician. A member of the Republican Party, he is the member-elect for the 54th district of the Colorado House of Representatives. He was elected at the 2026 election. He was a candidate for Colorado's 3rd congressional district in 2026.
