= Infrastructure bias =

Influence of the location and availability of pre-existing infrastructure, such

In economics and social policy, infrastructure bias is the influence of the location and availability of pre-existing infrastructure, such as roads and telecommunications facilities, on social and economic development.

In science, infrastructure bias is the influence of existing social or scientific infrastructure on scientific observations.

In astronomy and particle physics, where the availability of particular kinds of telescopes or particle accelerators acts as a constraint on the types of experiments that can be done, the data that can be retrieved is biased towards that which can be obtained by the equipment.

Procedural bias, related to infrastructure bias, is shown by a case of irregular genetic sampling of Bolivian wild potatoes. A 2000 report of previous studies' sampling found that 60% of samples had been taken near towns or roads, where 22% would be the average, had the samples been taken at random (or from equidistant points, or at specifically varying distances from towns, representative of the average terrain density).
