= John Henry effect =

Bias in social experimentation

The John Henry effect is a bias that can occur in social experiments if members of a control group are aware of their status and are able to actively work harder to overcome the "disadvantage" of being in the control group, thus skewing results of the study.

For example, if in an educational trial where the school classes who are in the treatment receive an extra support teacher, students who are in the control group may be induced to work harder to overcome that disadvantage.

The term was first used by Gary Saretsky (1972) to describe the behavior of John Henry, a legendary American steel driver in the 1870s who, when he heard his output was being compared with that of a steam drill, worked so hard to outperform the machine that he died in the process.

== See also ==
- Hawthorne effect
- Reactivity (psychology)
- John Henryism
