= Iron Triangle =

Iron Triangle may refer to:

== Geography ==
- The Iron Triangle, an area bounded by the South Australian towns of Whyalla, Port Augusta, and Port Pirie on the upper Spencer Gulf
- The Iron Triangle, a junction of three major railroad lines in Fostoria, Ohio
- Iron Triangle (Korea), a Korean War term referring to an area between Cheorwon County and Kimhwa in the south and Pyonggang in the north of Gangwon Province
- Iron Triangle (Vietnam), the name U.S. forces in the Vietnam War gave to the Communist stronghold region northwest of Saigon
- Iron Triangle, Richmond, California, a neighborhood bounded on its three sides by railroad tracks
- Willets Point, Queens, New York, known as "Iron Triangle" for its metal works

== Media ==
- Iron Triangle, unofficial title of a collaboration of Wuxia and Kung Fu movie director Chang Cheh and actors Ti Lung and David Chiang starting in 1968, resulting in over 40 movies
- The Iron Triangle (film), a 1989 Vietnam War film shot in Sri Lanka starring Beau Bridges and Johnny Hallyday
- Nobunaga's Ambition: Iron Triangle, a 1983 game in the Nobunaga's Ambition series

== Military ==
- Battle of the Iron Triangle, a battle in Vietnam between the ARVN and the NVA on May 16, 1974
- Operation Iron Triangle, a military operation in the Iraq War in 2006

== In other uses ==
- Iron Triangle, also known as Project triangle or Triple Constraint, a project management concept
- Iron triangle (US politics), a concept in U.S. politics involving a three-sided relationship among Congress, a Federal department or agency, and a particular industry or interest group

== See also ==
- Triangle (musical instrument), also known as a dinner bell
- Wye (rail), sometimes known as a railroad (iron rail) triangle
- Iron triad, the elements iron, cobalt and nickel
