= Allegiance bias =

Bias in behavioral sciences

Allegiance bias (or allegiance effect) in behavioral sciences is a bias resulted from the investigator's or researcher's allegiance to a specific party or school of thought. Researchers and investigators have encountered various branches of psychology and schools of thought. It is common for them to gravitate towards a school or branch that aligns with their thinking paradigm. Allegiance bias occurs when therapists, researchers, and others start to believe that their school of thought or treatment approach is superior to others. Their strong belief in specific schools of thought can introduce bias into their research on effective treatment trials or investigative scenarios, resulting in allegiance bias. This bias may arise because they have focused on treatments that have shown success in their previous experiences. Consequently, this focus can lead to misinterpretations of research results. Their commitment to adhering to their established thinking paradigm could hinder their capacity to discover more effective treatments to aid patients or address the situations under investigation. Moreover, allegiance bias in a forensic context can be attributed to the fact that experts are often hired by a particular party. Whether an expert witness is retained by the prosecution or defense can influence their assessment of the case, including their perception of the accused's level of guilt.

== History ==
"Therapeutic allegiance of the experimenter was first used by Luborsky Singer, and Luborsky" in a journal article published in 1975. The basis of their study looked for comparisons among some psychotherapy practices. They found that patients fared better when combined treatments of therapies were used versus only one treatment applied. They found the strongest allegiance are those therapists who are the authors of new implemented practices or supervise others in a practice. They will tend to use their treatment more often.

=== Psychotherapy ===
One reason why this occurs in psychotherapy is that there are many new therapies being implemented and researched. Supported research explains that those who develop "specific psychotherapy treatments show more interest for the evidence-based practice of their own therapies compared to others."

=== Forensic psychology ===
Most often, forensic experts tend to form a biased opinion in favor of the party retaining their services, rather than maintaining objectivity based on the available evidence. Some studies have evaluated biases in legal cases and have observed that forensic psychologists may be hired by a specific party or attorney due to their preexisting attitude in favor of capital punishment. This predisposition may lead them to be more receptive to accepting capital case referrals from certain adversarial parties, indicating a partial allegiance to cases that align with their opinions. These biases have the potential to undermine justice in legal proceedings, posing a threat to our society. The American Psychological Association is aware of the impact of biases and has developed guidelines to address these preexisting attitudes and biases. These guidelines aim to assist forensic psychologists in maintaining objectivity when selecting court cases.

A study conducted by Sauerland, M., Otgaar, H., Maegherman, E., & Sagana, A. (2020) attempted to reduce bias through falsified instructions. Participants were provided with a case file and a letter from either the prosecution or defense, instructing them to critically evaluate both sides. However, the intervention did not yield a significant effect. Participants were still influenced by the party they were assigned to, similar to when they did not receive any instructions. The bias effect size was found to be medium. The authors emphasize the significance of cross-examinations in forensic contexts until effective interventions to mitigate allegiance bias are identified.

In a study by McAuliff, B. and Arter, J. (2016), the phenomenon of allegiance bias in cases of child sexual abuse was examined. In an online study, experts were assigned to either the prosecution or defense. They were shown one of two versions of a video depicting a police interview with a 4-year-old girl, with the videos varying in the suggestibility of the interview. One interview version included suggestive questions, that imply or lead the respondent toward a particular answer, while the other contained neutral questions that allow an open response. The experts were tasked with evaluating the interview, the child's testimony, and answering follow-up questions related to their ability to testify as experts and the specific aspects of the interview they would focus on in their testimony. The study revealed significant effects: experts were more inclined to support the prosecution's case when the interview's suggestibility was low, and conversely, they were more likely to support the defense when suggestibility was high. Thus, it was demonstrated that even experts are susceptible to the allegiance bias. The researchers highlighted the importance of opposing expert testimony, cross-examination, and, in extreme cases, even the threat of prosecution as strategies to help mitigate allegiance bias.

=== Analyses ===
Allegiance bias is also evident when authors and researchers critique each other's work. In some cases, studies assert that a prior article validated a bias, creating a cycle of reinforcement. It is crucial to scrutinize the methods by which these authors arrive at their conclusions. They may inadvertently exhibit allegiance bias by selectively testing previous articles against their own work and overstating the conclusions they draw. Ironically, these authors may be employing allegiance bias to affirm the accuracy of their own research findings.

== Critiques ==
Despite the fact that researchers find the outcomes of psychological evaluations to be influenced from allegiance from a specific school of thought, the role of allegiance in the research field should be evaluated cautiously. Several meta-analyses have shown contradictory results between experimenter's allegiance (EA) and assessment effect sizes in favor of the preferred conclusions. These are meta-analysis that examines a combination of psychotherapy and non-psychotherapy treatments (e.g., medication) if it was directly compared with another type of psychotherapy or meta-analysis evaluating direct comparisons between different types of psychotherapy. Meta-analysis assessing non-verbal techniques, web-based treatments and non-specific or miscellaneous treatments (e.g., yoga, dietary advice, recreation, biofeedback, etc.) should also be excluded.

=== Sensitivity ===
The analysis on direct comparisons did not address the quality of studies and neither did it have any significant association between allegiant and non-allegiant studies; whereas significant differences were observed in cases where treatment integrity was not evaluated.

In legal cases, evaluator attitudes and other attributes may systematically influence from whom evaluators are willing to accept a referral. Filtering and selection effects in adversarial settings have been assumed to exist, but with few empirical tests of the hypothesis to date. Current studies demonstrate that these experts have preexisting biases that may affect for whom they are willing to work in the adversarial system–thus, likely amplifying the effects of the system-induced biases when layered with preexisting expert biases.

== Remedies ==
=== Objective methods ===
- Creating a list - this would be the simplest method for a professional to hypothesize all/any possibilities that would seem reasonable, at the inception of an evaluation process.
- Surveillance

=== Disclosures ===
==== Reporting policies ====
Systematic reviews and meta-analysis are essential to summarise evidence relating to efficacy and safety of healthcare interventions accurately and reliably. The clarity and transparency of these reports, however, are not optimal. Poor reporting of systematic reviews diminishes their value to clinicians, policy makers, and other users.

===== QUOROM =====
Since the development of the QUOROM (quality of reporting of meta-analysis) statement—a reporting guideline published in 1999—there have been several conceptual, methodological, and practical advances regarding the conduct and reporting of systematic reviews and meta-analysis. Also, reviews of published systematic reviews have found that key information about these studies is often poorly reported.

===== PRISMA =====
Realizing these issues, an international group that included experienced authors and methodologists developed PRISMA (preferred reporting items for systematic reviews and meta-analysis) as an evolution of the original QUOROM guideline for systematic reviews and meta-analysis of evaluations of health care interventions.

The PRISMA statement consists of a 27-item checklist and a four-phase flow diagram. The checklist includes items deemed essential for transparent reporting of a systematic review. In this explanation and elaboration document, they have explained the meaning and rationale for each checklist item & have include an example of good reporting, while also where possible, references to relevant empirical studies and methodological literature.

== See also ==
- Bias
- Impartiality
- Empiricism
- Conformity
