= Watching-eye effect =

People behave more altruistically in the presence of images that depict eyes

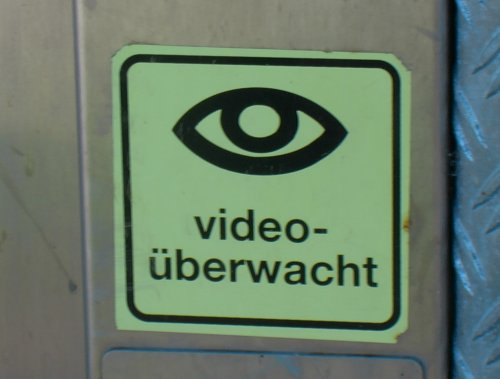
A sticker in German warning that the reader is being "video monitored". Even just the presence of an eye symbol on a sticker can be enough to change a person's behavior.

The watching-eye effect says that people behave more altruistically and exhibit less antisocial behavior in the presence of images that depict eyes, because these images insinuate that they are being watched. Eyes are strong signals of perception for humans. They signify that one's actions are being seen and paid attention to even through mere depictions of eyes.

It has been demonstrated that these effects are so pronounced that even depictions of eyes are enough to trigger them. This means that people need not actually be watched, but that a simple photograph of eyes is enough to elicit feelings that individuals are being watched which can impact their behavior to be more pro-social and less antisocial. Empirical psychological research has continually shown that the visible presence of images depicting eyes slightly, but measurably, nudges people towards more honest and more pro-social behavior.

The concept is part of the psychology of surveillance and has implications for the areas of crime reduction and prevention without increasing actual surveillance, just by psychological measures alone. By simply inserting signs depicting eyes and leading others to believe they are being watched, crime can be reduced, as it leads to behavior that is more socially acceptable.

== Similar effects ==
The effect differs from the psychic staring effect in that the latter describes the feeling of being watched, whereas individuals who succumb to the watching-eye effect usually affect behaviour through the subconscious level.

== Evidence of effects on behavior ==
=== Effects on pro-social behavior ===
There is evidence that images of eyes being present cause people to behave pro-socially. Pro-social behavior is acting in a way or with the intent that benefits others. There are two forms of motivation that support this. One being negative motivation that makes people want to avoid behavior that is wrong and violates the norm. They want to keep up a positive social image, or be seen improving their image rather than worsening it. The second being positive motivation to get a reward or benefits in the future. They believed that under watching eyes that if they behaved in a positive manner that benefited others, they were likely to get paid back for it in the future.

==== Pro-social experiments ====
Certain studies have shown that under the influence of eyes people will behave as truthfully honest. Under controlled groups without images of eyes present people were more likely to behave anti-socially and lie for the benefit of others. People lean toward honesty rather than acting generously to keep a good image in these situations in order to avoid violating norms. In these situations honesty is often chosen since it is seen as the most pro-social behavior.

There are more examples of studies that show that pro-social behavior is more likely under watchful behavior. People were more likely to share things such as money in games that had to do with economics when presented with images with eyes. People were also shown to be more likely to pick up trash at bus stops and pick up after themselves in a cafeteria, they were less likely to commit bicycle theft, and people were much more likely to give the full amount of money for their coffee on certain days that images of eyes were put up nearby.

In an experiment on littering funded by the School of Psychology at Newcastle University it was found that places that already had trash on the ground tending to have an increase in littering, showing that people tend to behave in ways that seem socially acceptable. Likewise, it was discovered that images of eyes that insinuated watching caused a reduce in littering however, the reduction of littering was mainly only present when there were also larger groups of people around. The findings of this study added to the idea that watching eyes reduce anti-social behavior and increase people to behave more pro-socially.

=== Donation experiment ===
In situations where the image of eyes were present people were also more likely to be generous with donations and give more. One study testing this was done at the University of Virginia by Caroline Kelsey. The study was done at a children's museum where there was a donation box at the front desk. Data was collected from this setting for 28 weeks, testing more than 34,100 people who visited in the span of this time. Each week the sign over the box that usually read "Donations would be appreciated" changed to primarily images of eyes or other inanimate objects such as chairs or noses with some wording with it. Throughout each week the number of people who visited the museum was recorded along with the total amount of donations made. By the end of the study it was found that patrons donated more under the presence of eyes on the signs rather than other inanimate objects.

=== More on studies ===
Other studies in relation to the watching-eye-effect show that people are more cooperative and aware of themselves when their identity is exposed as opposed to when they are acting anonymously. They act more respectfully and appropriately because their reputation is at risk when they are being watched by others or feel that they are being watched. Even in some studies that insisted to their participants that their actions were anonymous they were still more generous because they felt identified by the eyes.

Some studies argue that it may not be the effect of these eyes that gives people incentive to be more generous, but the number of people that are around them that make them feel peer pressure to conform to more pro-social behavior.

== See also ==
- Decision-making
- Evil eye
- Eye contact
- Fake security camera
- Gaze
- Hawthorne effect
- Security theater
- Situation awareness
- Subject-expectancy effect
