= Novelty effect =

Effect from introducing new elements

The novelty effect is an effect of introducing new elements on some activity or behavior.

== In performance ==
In the context of human performance, is the tendency for performance to initially improve when new technology is instituted, not because of any actual improvement in learning or achievement, but in response to increased interest in the new technology.

The Metropolitan Education and Research Consortium of the Virginia Commonwealth University states, "While it is possible that higher attention spans can be attributed to novelty effect, even after the initial novelty wears off, the level of interest in the automated workbook is still greater than that in the regular workbook. The increased attention by students sometimes results in increased effort or persistence, which yields achievement gains. If they are due to a novelty effect, these gains tend to diminish as students become more familiar with the new medium. This was the case in reviews of computer-assisted instruction at the secondary school level, grades 6 to 12".

== In learning ==
In the context of learning, the novelty effect refers to a temporary increase in engagement or attention following the introduction of a new instructional tool or technology. This effect often occurs due to the initial excitement or interest generated by the novelty itself rather than the inherent effectiveness of the tool or method. Over time, as the novelty wears off, engagement or performance may decline, demonstrating the limitations of the learning intervention. Research also suggests that this is due to the interference of novelty with one's autonomous motivation: as the sense of initial curiosity or enjoyment linked to novelty diminishes, so does the learner's intrinsic motivation, unless the task becomes internally meaningful.

Several studies across different educational technologies and settings have demonstrated the novelty effect. Björkman et al. (2019) studied the adoption of mobile learning devices (MLDs) among radiology residents and found that the majority of participants reported increased time spent studying following the introduction of MLDs. This effect was most prominent during the first six months, however, there was later a decline in motivation attributable to the novelty effect. This is explained by the hedonic treadmill, which suggests that users adapt to new stimuli quickly, making initially engaging experiences feel routine and less satisfying over time. This causes a decline in usage or engagement with digital learning tools.

The novelty effect is also observed in gamified learning environments.

- Computer-based gamified learning systems demonstrate an increase in user activity upon initial implementation, followed by a notable drop as the novelty diminishes. In educational gamification, novelty can initially increase learner motivation by turning mundane activities into engaging tasks. Over time, however, this perceived novelty fades unless meaningful gamification principles are introduced to maintain interest.
- Gamified quizzes, when initially implemented, have been suggested to be beneficial for students, however, this effect wears off over time, attributing this to novelty.

Rodrigues et al. (2022) conducted a longitudinal study of Brazilian STEM students using gamified and non-gamified platforms over seven learning intervals. They found that gamification effects followed a U-shaped curve, where the initial engagement dropped after four weeks (consistent with the novelty effect) but then increased again due to a familiarisation effect, whereby learners adapted to the system and derived ongoing value from it, positively impacting them.

=== Limitations ===
While the novelty effect has been demonstrated in a range of contexts, its use may be compromised since novel instruments and learning tools have been found to distract individuals, hindering their ability to focus on learning. For instance, in a study of immersive Virtual Reality (iVR), students who did not receive a tutorial on how to use this technology had lower satisfaction and less ability to focus on learning objectives. In immersive environments such as iVR, novelty may lead to an increased cognitive load, especially for beginners. Users often focus on mastering the interface rather than engaging with the core learning objectives. This diverts their cognitive resources, reducing actual learning.

== In memory ==
In the context of memory, the novelty effect refers to the enhanced recall of new stimuli compared to familiar stimuli, as novel stimuli are often prioritised in memory. The Novelty-Encoding Hypothesis, proposed by Tulving and Kroll (1995), suggests that novel information is encoded more effectively into long-term memory than familiar information. This is due to increased activation in the hippocampus upon the encounter of novel stimuli. In experimental settings, their participants demonstrated higher accuracy in explicit recognition tasks for novel words than for familiar ones, through the use of word lists.

Novel stimuli are prioritised by the brain due to their inherent salience, which can signal potential danger or reward. This influence can extend beyond the stimulus itself, as exposure to novelty has been shown to enhance memory not only for novel material, but also for information presented immediately before or after the novel experience. Spatial novelty, which involves encountering a new environment or spatial layout, has been shown to heighten brain plasticity and improve learning and memory encoding.

=== The biological mechanisms ===
The hippocampus plays a central role in detecting novelty and initiating processes that strengthen memory formation. When novel information is detected, this engages the hippocampus, which in turns signals dopaminergic regions. This interaction results in dopamine release that lowers the threshold for long-term potentiation (LTP): this is the long-lasting increase in the strength of synaptic connections in the brain in the hippocampus. This thus facilitates memory formation.

Neuroimaging studies have found that temporal and parietal brain regions show greater activation in response to novel items compared to familiar ones, reflecting the increased cognitive processing required for new information. Furthermore, exploring novel environments enhances synaptic plasticity, particularly in the hippocampus. This enhancement is known as the Behavioural Tagging Hypothesis, whereby novel experiences 'tag' synapses, causing them to capture plasticity related proteins (PRPs). PRPs are a group of proteins that are crucial in synaptic plasticity. This converts LTP into stable changes - a key process in memory consolidation as memory retention is prolonged.

Novelty is further linked to theta oscillations in the hippocampus, which are brain wave patterns associated with active learning. According to a model proposed by Lisman and Otmakhova (2001), novelty induces a theta-dominant state that shifts the hippocampus into a "learning mode", as opposed to a "recall mode". This rhythmic activity facilitates the encoding of novel stimuli.

=== Limitations ===
A limitation of Tulving and Kroll's (1995) Novelty-Encoding Hypothesis is that the novelty effect may result from retrieval errors rather than enhanced memory encoding. Dobbins et al. (1998) found that participants incorrectly recalled familiar items because it was difficult for them to remember when they saw one. When the researchers used different tasks in each learning phase to reduce confusion, the novelty effect disappeared. These findings suggest that the novelty effect may originate from retrieval confusion, rather than superior encoding of novel information. However, various research has demonstrated that accuracy is higher for novel stimuli than for familiar stimuli, providing continued support for the Novelty-Encoding Hypothesis.

== In psychology ==
The novelty effect is the tendency for an individual to have the strongest stress response the first time that individual is faced with a potentially threatening experience. Over time, as the novelty wears off, the stress response decreases. This is a threat to external validity when individuals participating in a research study (a novel situation) perceive and respond differently than they would in the normal real world.

== See also ==
- Hawthorne effect (observer effect)
