= Naturalistic observation =

Observation of a subject in its natural habitat

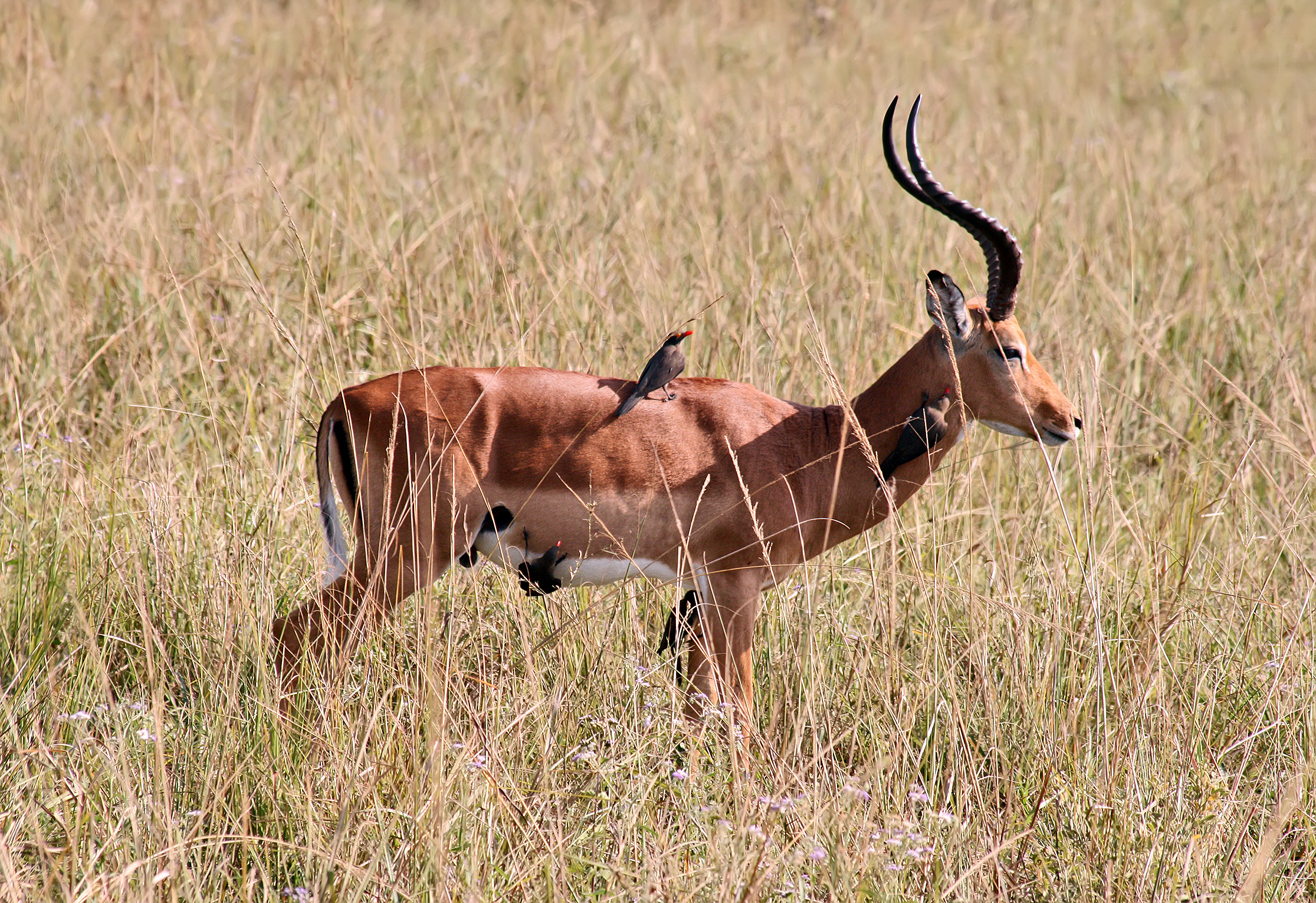

Naturalistic observation, sometimes referred to as fieldwork, is a valuable form of empirical data collection in research methodology across numerous fields of science (including ethology, anthropology, linguistics, social sciences, and psychology) in which data are collected as they occur in nature, without any manipulation by the observer. Examples range from watching an animal's eating patterns in the forest to observing the behavior of students in a school setting. During naturalistic observation, researchers take great care using unobtrusive methods to avoid interfering with the behavior they are observing. Naturalistic observation contrasts with analog observation in an artificial setting that is designed to be an analog of the natural situation, constrained so as to eliminate or control for effects of any variables other than those of interest. There is similarity to observational studies in which the independent variable of interest cannot be experimentally controlled for ethical or logistical reasons.

Naturalistic observation has both advantages and disadvantages as a research methodology. Observations are more credible because the behavior occurs in a real, typical scenario as opposed to an artificial one generated within a lab. Behavior that could never occur in controlled laboratory environment can lead to new insights. Naturalistic observation also allows for study of events that are deemed unethical to study experimentally, such as the impact of high school shootings on students attending the high school. However, because extraneous variables cannot be controlled as in a laboratory, it is difficult to replicate findings and demonstrate their reliability. In particular, if subjects know they are being observed they may behave differently than otherwise. It may be difficult to generalize findings of naturalistic studies beyond the observed situations.

== See also ==
- James Robertson
- Joyce Robertson
- Jane Goodall
- Meditation
- Natural history
- Observer-expectancy effect
- People watching
- Qualitative research
- Scholar-practitioner model
- Unobtrusive measures
