= Unobtrusive research =

Data collection method

Unobtrusive research (or unobtrusive measures) is a method of data collection used primarily in the social sciences. The term unobtrusive measures was coined by Webb, Campbell, Schwartz, & Sechrest in a 1966 book titled Unobtrusive Measures: Nonreactive Research in the Social Sciences. The authors described methodologies which do not involve direct elicitation of data from the research subjects. Unobtrusive measures are contrasted with interviews and questionnaires, in that they try to find indirect ways to obtain the necessary data. The unobtrusive approach often seeks unusual data sources, such as garbage, graffiti and obituaries, as well as more conventional ones such as published statistics.

Unobtrusive measures should not be perceived as an alternative to more reactive methods such as interviews, surveys and experiments, but rather as an additional tool in the tool chest of the social researcher. Unobtrusive measures can assist in tackling known biases such as selection bias and experimenter's bias. Webb and his colleagues emphasize the importance of triangulating the results obtained through various methodologies, each with its own unique set of (usually unknown) biases.

The proliferation of digital media opened a new era for communication researchers in search of unobtrusively obtained data sources. Online communication creates digital footprints that can allow an analysis of data that are obtained through unobtrusive methods, and are also massively larger than any corpora obtained via elicitation and human transcription. These footprints can now be used to analyze topics such as the content of communication events, the process of communication, and the structure of the communicative network. The surge of Internet-sourced research data rekindled the discussion of the ethical aspects of using unobtrusively obtained data. For example, can all data collected in the public domain be used for research purposes? When should we seek consent, and is it realistic to require informed consent from sources of unobtrusively collected data? These questions do not have a simple answer, and the solution is a result of a careful and ongoing dialog between researchers, and between researchers and society.
