= Deaths in August 1996 =

The following is a list of notable deaths in August 1996.

Entries for each day are listed alphabetically by surname. A typical entry lists information in the following sequence:

- Name, age, country of citizenship at birth, subsequent country of citizenship (if applicable), reason for notability, cause of death (if known), and reference.

== August 1996 ==
=== 1 ===
- Frida Boccara, 55, French singer, respiratory disease.
- Frank Glassman, 88, American football player.
- Stig Hedberg, 80, Swedish Olympic sailor (1948).
- Ayo Gabriel Irikefe, 74, Nigerian Jurist and Chief Justice of Nigeria.
- Tadeusz Reichstein, 99, Polish chemist.
- Lucille Teasdale-Corti, 67, Canadian medical doctor and surgeon, AIDS-related complications.
- Charles van Rooy, 84, Dutch politician.
- Franz Wenninger, 85, Austrian Olympic water polo player (1936).

=== 2 ===
- Mohamed Farrah Aidid, 61, Somalian military officer.
- Brian Briggs, 62, English rugby player.
- James Joseph Byrne, 88, American Catholic archbishop.
- Michel Debré, 84, Prime Minister of France, Parkinson's disease.
- Miguel Alvarez del Toro, 78, Mexican biologist.
- Sergey Golovkin, 36, Soviet/Russian serial killer and rapist and last Russian executee, execution.
- Alexander Nudelman, 83, Soviet/Russian engineer, aircraft guns designer.
- Bob Reinhard, 75, American gridiron football player (Los Angeles Dons, Los Angeles Rams).
- Lloyd Robinson, 83, Welsh cricketer.
- Zbigniew Syka, 60, Polish Olympic sprinter (1964).
- Obdulio Varela, 78, Uruguayan football player.
- Kazumi Watanabe, 48, Japanese Olympic sport shooter (1984, 1988, 1992).

=== 3 ===
- Guido Alberti, 87, Italian actor and entrepreneur.
- Jørgen Garde, 57, Danish admiral.
- Günther Knödler, 71, German Olympic fencer (1952).
- Dankwart Rustow, 71, American political scientist.
- Luciano Tajoli, 76, Italian actor and singer.
- Bill Wright, 82, American baseball player.

=== 4 ===
- Kiyoshi Atsumi, 68, Japanese actor, lung cancer.
- Willard Brown, 81, American Hall of Fame baseball player.
- Geoff Hamilton TV Presenter & Gardener (Gardeners' World).
- Lev Lemke, 64, Soviet/Russian actor.
- Vladimir Liberzon, 59, Israeli chess player.
- Alan Osborne, 62, Australian rules footballer.
- André Trochut, 64, French road bicycle racer.

=== 5 ===
- Agustín Argote, 70, Spanish Olympic boxer (1948).
- Abdulrahman Mohamed Babu, 71, Zanzibari marxist revolutionary.
- Claudio Barigozzi, 87, Italian geneticist and biologist.
- Jan Holleman, 77, Dutch footballer.
- Frank Marcus, 68, British playwright.
- Havelock Nelson, 79, Irish composer.

=== 6 ===
- Muhammad al-Badr, 70, Yemeni imam and politician.
- Ossie Clark, 54, British fashion designer, stabbing.
- Len Coldwell, 63, British cricket player.
- Bobby Enriquez, 53, Filipino jazz pianist.
- Gerry Gomez, 76, Trinidad and Tobago football player and cricketer.
- Charles Hadfield, 87, British historian.
- Joe Hanly, 71, Irish Olympic rower (1948).
- Floyd Simmons, 71, American gridiron football player (Notre Dame Fighting Irish, Chicago Rockets).
- Bud Svendsen, 81, American gridiron football player (Green Bay Packers, Brooklyn Dodgers), and coach.
- Emilio Zapico, 52, Spanish racing driver, aviation accident.
- Hernán Siles Zuazo, 82, Bolivian politician.

=== 7 ===
- Benjamin Halevy, 86, Israeli politician.
- Bill Hanrahan, 77, American broadcaster.
- Anne Kristen, 59, Scottish actress, pancreatic cancer.
- Herbert Kubly, 81, American journalist.
- Helen W. Nies, 71, American judge.
- Brian Oddie, 91, British long-distance runner and Olympian (1928).
- Loret Miller Ruppe, 60, American diplomat, ovarian cancer.

=== 8 ===
- Queta Carrasco, 83, Mexican actress.
- Michio Hoshino, 43, Japanese photographer, bear attack.
- Herbert Huncke, 81, American writer and poet.
- Philip Lucock, 80, Australian politician.
- James McLamore, 70, American businessman.
- Francesco Molinari-Pradelli, 85, Italian conductor and art collector.
- Sir Nevill Mott, 90, English physicist, Nobel prize winner.
- Joseph Asajirō Satowaki, 92, Japanese Catholic Bishop.
- Julian Stryjkowski, 91, Polish journalist.
- Sir Frank Whittle, 89, British Royal Air Force officer, lung cancer.

=== 9 ===
- Tokiharu Abe, 85, Japanese ichthyologist, cerebral hemorrhage.
- May Ayim, 36, German poet, suicide.
- Lionel Emmett, 83, Indian physician and Olympic field hockey player (1936).
- John W. King, 77, American politician.
- Derek Smith, 34, American basketball player, myocardial infarction.

=== 10 ===
- Alex Lee, 88, Australian rules footballer.
- Walter MacNutt, 86, Canadian organist, choir director, and composer.
- Doris Spiegel, 95, American artist.
- Bunleua Sulilat, 64, Thai Buddhist leader.
- Rex Tucker, 83, British television director.
- Edward Whitfield, 85, English cricket player.

=== 11 ===
- Rafael Kubelík, 82, Czech conductor, violinist, composer and director conductor of Czech philharmony.
- Kathleen Mills, 72, Irish camogie player.
- Ambrosio Padilla, 85, Filipino basketball player, Olympian (1936), and senator.
- David Ricketts, 76, British cyclist and Olympian (1948).
- Mel Taylor, 62, American musician, myocardial infarction.
- Ted Thomas, 74, Australian rules footballer.
- Baba Vanga, 84, Bulgarian psychic, breast cancer.

=== 12 ===
- Victor Ambartsumian, 87, Soviet/Armenian astrophysicist.
- Robert Gravel, 51, Canadian actor.
- Mark Gruenwald, 43, American comic book writer, editor, and penciler, myocardial infarction.
- Stephan Kuttner, 89, American legal scholar.
- Raymond Langlois, 60, Canadian politician, member of the House of Commons of Canada (1962-1968).
- Guy Nosbaum, 66, French rower and Olympian (1952, 1960).
- Anthony Parsons, 73, British diplomat, cancer.
- George Parsons, 85, Canadian Olympic sailor (1956).

=== 13 ===
- Alfred Borda, 82, Maltese Olympic sailor (1960).
- Albert Sherman Christensen, 91, American district judge (United States District Court for the District of Utah).
- António de Spínola, 86, President of Portugal, pulmonary embolism.
- Richard M. Goodwin, 83, American academic.
- Willi Heeks, 74, German racecar driver.
- T. John Lesinski, 71, American politician.
- Bill Owen, 60, Australian rugby league footballer.
- Ray Shore, 75, American baseball player (St. Louis Browns), and coach (Cincinnati Reds).
- Louise Talma, 89, American composer.
- David Tudor, 70, American pianist and composer.

=== 14 ===
- Sergiu Celibidache, 84, Romanian conductor.
- Al Cleveland, 66, American songwriter.
- Uzo Egonu, 64, Nigerian artist.
- Camilla Horn, 93, German actress.
- Tom Mees, 46, American sportscaster, drowned.
- Albert Neuberger, 88, British biochemist and academic.
- Amrit Rai, 74, Indian writer, poet and biographer.
- Ernst Rufli, 86, Swiss rower and Olympian (1936).

=== 15 ===
- Rey Cuenco, 36, Filipino basketball player, cirrhosis.
- Lisskulla Jobs, 90, Swedish actress.
- Sven Lasta, 71, Croatian actor.
- Tania Leon, 51, South African feminist.
- Masao Maruyama, 82, Japanese political scientist.
- Dally O'Brien, 77, Australian rules footballer.
- Albert Osswald, 77, German politician.
- Jack Portland, 84, Canadian ice hockey player (Montreal Canadiens, Boston Bruins, Chicago Black Hawks), and Olympic jumper (1932).
- Joe Seneca, 77, American actor, singer, and songwriter, asthma.
- George Starbuck, 65, American poet.
- Max Thurian, 74, Swiss ecumenical monastic community subprior.

=== 16 ===
- Miles Goodman, 46, American film composer (Little Shop of Horrors, Dirty Rotten Scoundrels, Teen Wolf), heart attack.
- Fred Jinks, 87, Australian cricketer.
- Maurice Natanson, 71, American philosopher, prostate cancer.
- Pino Rucher, 72, Italian musician.
- Ediriweera Sarachchandra, 82, Sri Lankan academic and writer.
- Sadako Sawamura, 87, Japanese actress, myocardial infarction.

=== 17 ===
- E. Digby Baltzell, 80, American sociologist.
- Rob D'Alton, 73, Irish Olympic sailor (1964).
- Catherine Shipe East, 80, American government researcher and feminist.
- Eric Evans, 68, British Anglican priest.
- Don McVilly, 76, Australian rules footballer.
- Frans Reyniers, 68, Belgian footballer.
- Witold Urbanowicz, 88, Polish flying ace during World War II and general.

=== 18 ===
- Al Bertino, 84, American animator.
- Geoffrey Dearmer, 103, British poet.
- Hugo Gryn, 66, British rabbi, brain cancer.
- Charles Mitchel, 75, Irish actor and broadcaster.
- Isabel Morgan, 84, American virologist.
- Alfredo Varelli, 81, Italian actor.

=== 19 ===
- Tatyana Mavrina, 93, Russian painter and children's writer.
- Claire Rommer, 91, German actress.
- Guerrino Rossi, 62, Italian football player and coach.
- Joffre Soares, 77, Brazilian film actor.
- Owen Zinko, 51, Australian rules footballer.

=== 20 ===
- Abílio Duarte, 65, Cape Verdean politician.
- Paul Galloway, 52, Australian cricketer.
- Les Hart, 79, English football manager.
- André-Georges Haudricourt, 85, French academic.
- Carlos Jáuregui, 38, Argentinean LGBT activist, AIDS-related complications.
- Rio Reiser, 46, German rock musician.
- Beverley Whitfield, 42, Australian swimmer, Olympic gold medallist (1972).

=== 21 ===
- Jack Adams, 77, Canadian ice hockey player (Montreal Canadiens).
- Mary Two-Axe Earley, 84, Indigenous Canadian women's rights activist, respiratory disease.
- Johan Rathje, 80, Danish Olympic sailor (1948).
- Irene Vorrink, 78, Dutch politician.
- Richard S. Westfall, 72, American historian.

=== 22 ===
- Anandatissa de Alwis, 77, Sri Lankan journalist, marketeer and politician.
- Kjell Borgen, 56, Norwegian politician.
- Mareo Ishiketa, 79, Japanese composer.
- Erwin Leiser, 73, German film director.
- Oliver Lynn, 69, American American talent manager, diabetes.
- Ern O'Regan, 89, Australian rules footballer.

=== 23 ===
- Jurriaan Andriessen, 70, Dutch composer.
- Jeff Batters, 25, Canadian ice hockey defenceman (St. Louis Blues), car accident.
- Gordon S. Brown, 88, American electrical engineering professor.
- Wiley Griggs, 71, American baseball player.
- David Halfyard, 65, English cricket player.
- Øivind Holmsen, 84, Norwegian football player and Olympian (1936).
- Brendon O'Donnell, 79, Australian rules footballer.
- Audrey Patterson, 69, American sprinter and Olympian (1948).
- Margaret Tucker, 92, Indigenous Australian activist and writer.
- Zulfiya, 81, Uzbek poet.

=== 24 ===
- Jean Aurel, 70, French screenwriter and film director.
- Zainab Biisheva, 88, Soviet/Russian writer.
- Ethel Boyce, 79, Canadian baseball player.
- Roy Degoregore, 74, Nauruan politician.
- Eric Heaton, 75, British priest and scholar.
- Ben Joelson, 70, American producer and screenwriter.
- Hristo Mladenov, 68, Bulgarian football player.
- Lev Vlasenko, 67, Soviet/Russian musician.
- Jack Wratten, 90, Canadian politician, member of the House of Commons of Canada (1957-1962).

=== 25 ===
- Fred Adison, 87, French conductor.
- Erskine Barton Childers, 67, Irish writer, correspondent and United Nations civil servant.
- Cynthia Eager, 59, Hong Kong Olympic swimmer (1952).
- Sylvia Fisher, 86, Australian operatic soprano.
- Caroline Glachan, 14, Scottish murder victim.
- Reinhard Libuda, 52, German football player, cancer.
- Salvatore Mastroieni, 82, Italian long-distance runner and Olympian (1936).

=== 26 ===
- Nikolay Baskakov, 91, Russian Turkologist.
- Alejandro Agustín Lanusse, 77, President of the Argentine Republic.
- Mario Maskareli, 77, Montenegrin painter.
- Khalida Riyasat, 43, Pakistani television actress.
- Sven Stolpe, 91, Swedish journalist.

=== 27 ===
- Martin Disler, 47, Swiss artist, cerebrovascular disease.
- Bert Fortell, 71, Austrian actor.
- Abram Games, 82, British graphic designer.
- Eliakim Khumalo, 56, South African football player, homicide.
- Akiji Kobayashi, 65, Japanese actor, lung cancer.
- Agnieszka Kotlarska, 24, Polish fashion model and beauty queen, stab wound.
- Greg Morris, 62, American actor (Mission: Impossible, Vega$, The New Interns), brain cancer.
- Wayne D. Overholser, 89, American Western writer.
- Aliye Rona, 74, Turkish actress, cardiovascular disease.
- Yair Rosenblum, 52, Israeli composer, esophageal cancer.
- Gordon Stein, 55, American physiologist.
- Waldo Rudolph Wedel, 87, American archaeologist.

=== 28 ===
- Nancy Archibald, 84, Canadian Olympic fencer (1936).
- Dulcina de Moraes, 88, Brazilian stage actress and director.
- Gevork Kotiantz, 86, Russian artist.
- José dos Santos Lopes, 85, Brazilian football player.
- Phyllis Pearsall, 89, British cartographer and typographer, cancer.
- John Service, 65, British swimmer and Olympian (1948).
- Marion Stamps, 51, American activist.
- Al Zarilla, 77, American baseball player (St. Louis Browns, Boston Red Sox, Chicago White Sox).

=== 29 ===
- Rune Bjurström, 83, Swedish Olympic racewalker (1948).
- Norm Bright, 86, American runner, mountaineer, and teacher, pneumonia.
- J. B. Jackson, 86, American writer.
- Charles O'Neal, 92, American writer.
- Tera de Marez Oyens, 64, Dutch composer.

=== 30 ===
- Laura Adani, 82, Italian actress.
- Modesto Bria, 74, Paraguayan football player.
- Alfredo B. Crevenna, 82, Mexican film director and screenwriter, cancer.
- Mel Embree, 69, American football player (Baltimore Colts, Chicago Cardinals).
- Dunc Gray, 90, Australian racing cyclist and Olympian (1928, 1932, 1936).
- I Gusti Putu Oka Mona, 66, Indonesian Olympic high jumper (1956).
- José Toribio Merino, 80, Chilean politician and admiral.
- Josef Müller-Brockmann, 82, Swiss graphic designer.
- Christine Pascal, 42, French actress, screenwriter and director, suicide.
- Goliarda Sapienza, 72, Italian actress and writer, fall.
- José Sasía, 62, Uruguayan football player.

=== 31 ===
- Richard E. Cross, 86, American businessman, lawyer, and civic leader.
- Gil English, 87, American baseball player.
- Blaine Johnson, 34, American racing driver, racing accident.
- Milt Larkin, 85, American musician.
