= Wigry Narrow Gauge Railway =

Narrow-gauge railway line in Poland

Wigierska Kolej Wąskotorowa
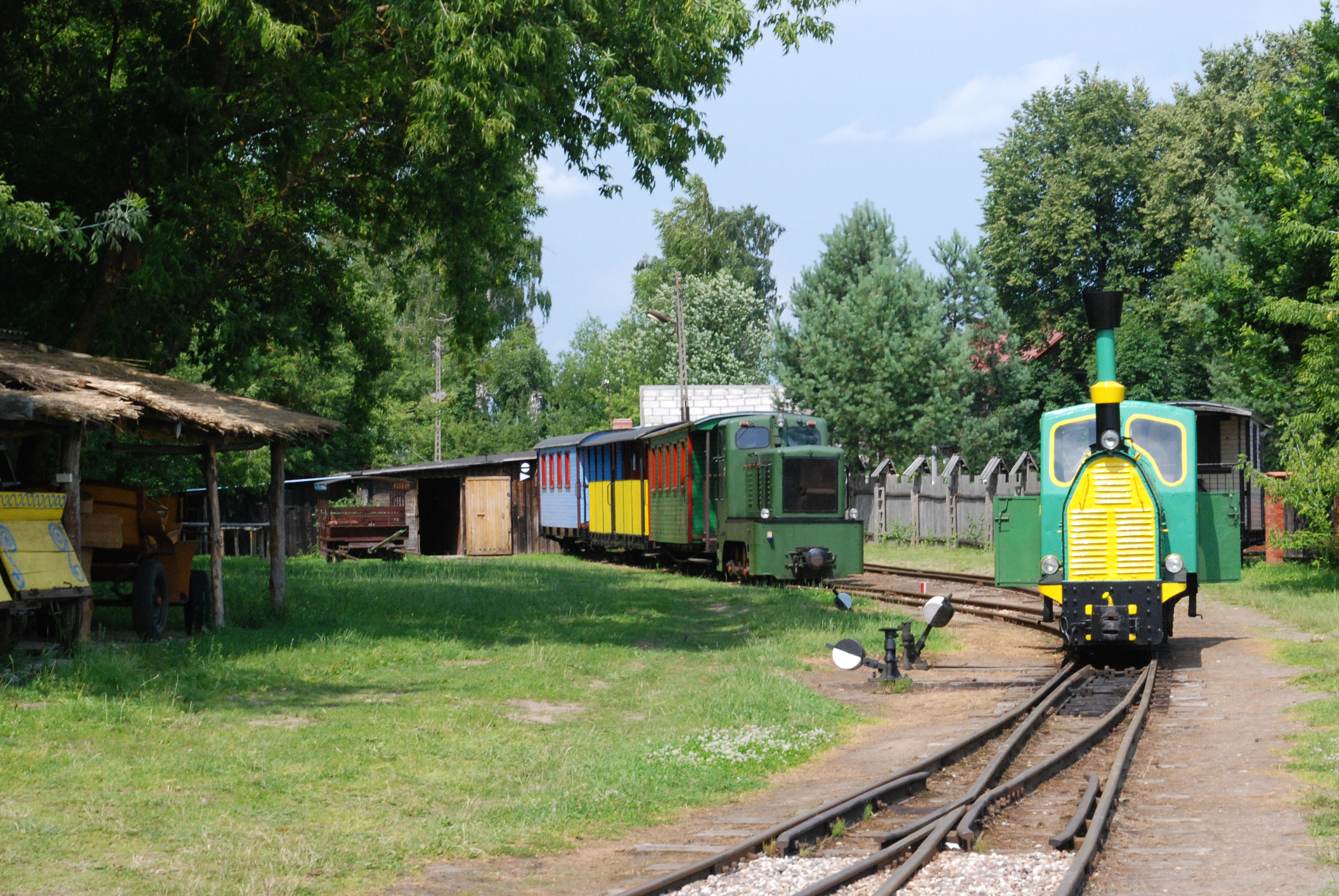
- Station at Płociczno
- Locale: Suwałki Region, Poland
- Terminus: Płociczno-Tartak
- Coordinates: 54°01′12″N 22°59′08″E

Commercial operations
- Original gauge: 600 mm (1 ft 11 5/8 in)

Preserved operations
- Owned by: State Forests
- Operated by: Wigierska Kolej Wąskotorowa s.c.
- Stations: 5
- Length: 9 kilometres (5.6 mi)
- Preserved gauge: 600 mm (1 ft 11 5/8 in)

Commercial history
- Opened: c.1910
- 1916: reconstructed under German occupation
- 1921: taken over by State Forests, changed track
- Closed: c.1990

Preservation history
- 2001: Re-opened as a heritage railway

Website
- https://augustowska.pl/

The Wigry Narrow Gauge Railway (Polish: Wigierska Kolej Wąskotorowa) is a 600 mm (1 ft 11 5/8 in) narrow-gauge railway built south of Wigry Lake in Suwałki Region in Poland. Construction commenced before World War I. It served as forest railway, to exploit forests around Wigry Lake, until the end of 1980s. Maximum length reached 45 km. Nowadays, from 2001, a 9-km part of the railway is utilized as a heritage railway and a tourist attraction. Trains run regularly from May until September according to a schedule.

The main station with all the rolling stock is located in Płociczno-Tartak near Suwałki.

== History ==
=== Forest railway ===
The first forest railways for transporting timber from the Augustów Primeval Forest in the area of Wigry Lake were built – differently than later – along its western shore. A convenient starting point for the forest railway was Płociczno, connected to the nearby standard gauge railway line. The first railway on the route from Płociczno through Gawrych-Ruda towards Wasilczyki forest settlement, still horse-drawn, was built around 1910. During World War I the region, formerly being in the Russian partition, was occupied by German Empire, which began predatory exploitation of timber and built the narrow-gauge railway there with a track width of 600 mm and steam traction. The construction of the railway began at the end of 1914, but the Russian counter-offensive caused the work to be interrupted for half a year. After reoccupying the Suwałki region, the Germans built a large sawmill (Polish: tartak) in the settlement of Płociczno, which was launched in the spring of 1916 (today's village of Płociczno-Tartak). Wood was brought to it by a temporary narrow-gauge railway built on the western shore (from the area of Cimochowizna and Leszczewek). In the autumn of 1916, a siding was built from the sawmill to the standard-gauge line at Płociczno railway stop to transport sawn timber, as well as long timber. At the end of 1916, the narrow-gauge railway was 13 km long and three steam locomotives were operating on it. After the war, the railway was taken over by the Polish state, which, however, stopped intensive deforestation on the western shore of the lake.

After the end of the Polish–Soviet War, in 1921 the railway was transferred to the State Forests Board in Siedlce. The railway was then expanded. Due to the commencement of exploitation of the forests on the eastern side of the lake, the tracks on the western shore were dismantled, and a new route was marked out along its southern shore, to Bryzgiel. Initially, horses were used to pull trains, then four steam locomotives were borrowed from the Polish State Railways. In 1923, the railway was extended further through Tobołowo to Głęboki Bród, and reached line length 23 km. It was then decided to extend the railway to Zelwa, which was completed in 1932, by building a branch line leading through Gulbin to Zelwa, with a wooden bridge over the Czarna Hańcza. The railway had 90 pairs of timber trolleys and 29 flatcars by then, and the length of the line was 37 km. The lakes located next to the route: Wigry, Wierśnie and Zelwa served as warehouses for preserving timber. In the interwar period, the railway also transported residents from Płociczno to a church in Monkinie.

During World War II, from October 1939, the Suwałki region was again under German occupation, and the railway was incorporated into the Deutsche Reichsbahn with a management in Koenigsberg. In order to continue a predatory timber exploitation, the Germans increased the rolling stock to six steam locomotives, 32 flatcars and 100 pairs of timber trolleys, and also modernized and expanded the infrastructure, including installing heavier rails and building concrete bridges and culverts instead of wooden ones. At that time, passenger transport was also started using two coaches. However, at the end of the war, the retreating Germans took or destroyed most of the rolling stock, without three steam locomotives, which were hidden by workers behind a blown-up bridge over the Czarna Hańcza.

After the war, the railway was taken over by the State Forests Board in Białystok. In 1948, an 8-kilometre branch line was built north along the eastern shore of the lake from Tobołów towards Maćkowa Ruda, with an intention of further extending the railway to Sejny, but this was abandoned and further work was suspended. The length of all lines reached a maximum of 45 km at that time. In mid-1950s, the railway had the largest fleet of rolling stock post war – five steam locomotives, 60 pairs of timber trolleys and 20 flatcars. Approximately 80,000 m³ of timber were transported per year. At the turn of the 1960s and 1970s, four LKM V10C diesel locomotives were introduced, replacing steam locomotives from the second half of the 1970s. However, at that time some of branch lines were liquidated due to a competition from road transport. The length of the network decreased to 36 km in 1984 and 27 km in 1992. In the second half of the 1980s, the narrow-gauge railway ceased operation for economic reasons, what coincided with a major economical crisis in Poland.

At the initiative of railway and local enthusiasts, in 1991, the railway was entered into the register of historical monuments under the number A-857 by a decision of 7 July 1991 as one of the longest operating forest railways in Poland. The section from Płociczna to the Augustów – Sejny road was protected, including the locomotive shed and repair plants. Over the following years however, due to lack of funds and a concept of its use, the railway infrastructure fell into disrepair, some of rails were stolen, and the rolling stock (which was not protected) was taken to other places or scrapped.

=== Heritage railway ===
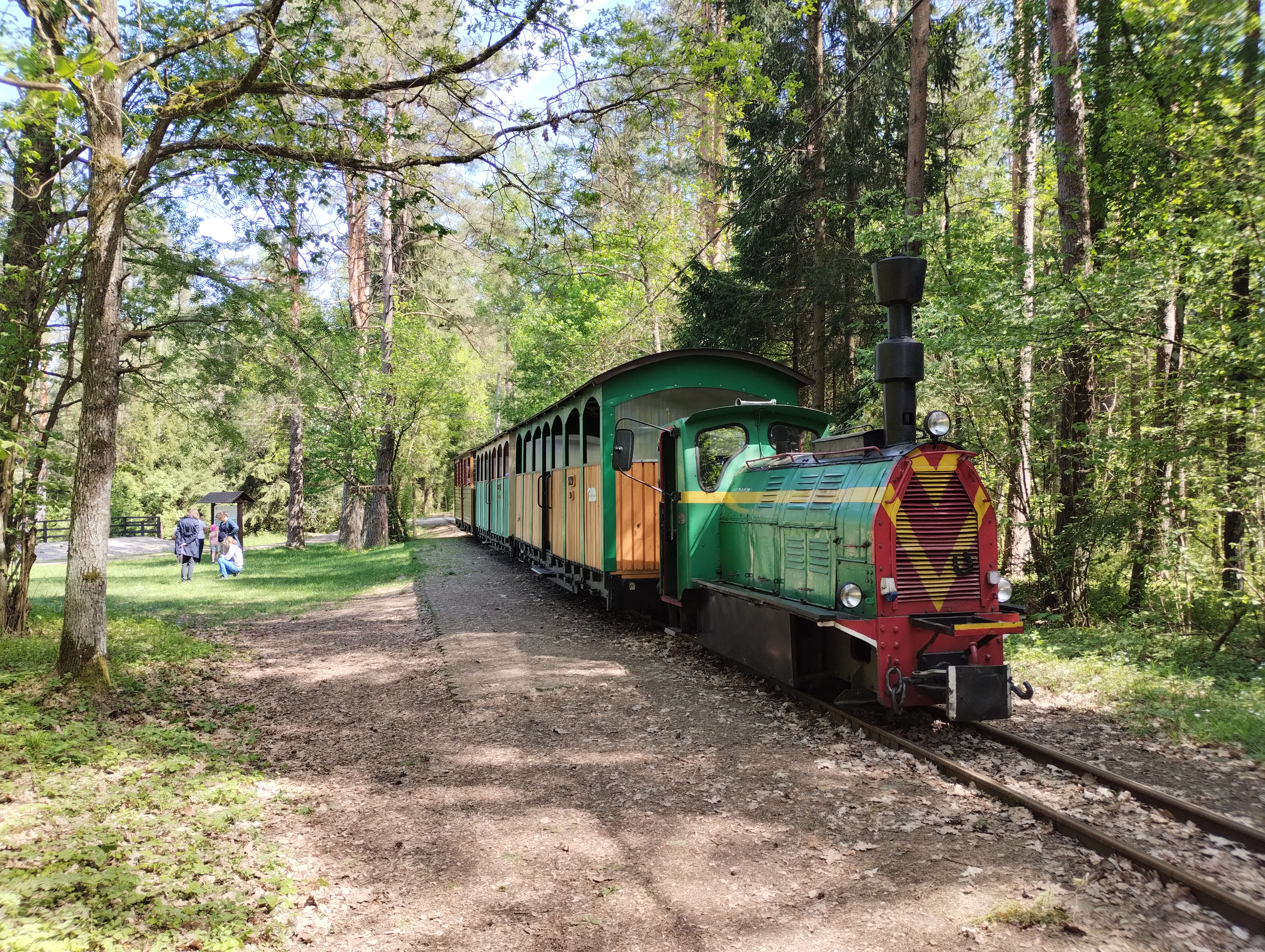
The train at Binduga stop, 2024

At the end of the 20th century, the idea of reopening the railway, as a tourist attraction of the Wigry National Park and Augustów Forest, was born on the initiative of a local entrepreneur from Płociczno Stanisław Huryn. In 1998, a civil partnership named Wigierska Kolej Wąskotorowa (Wigry Narrow Gauge Railway) was established for this purpose. Restoration work began in the autumn of 2000 and a 9-kilometre section from Płociczno to Krusznik had been renovated. The railway purchased and renovated carriages and three diesel locomotives (two WLs50 from a brickyard railway and one more powerful V10C from the Hajnówka railway). Along the trail, in attractive places of the Wigry National Park, viewing stops were set up near shores of Wigry Lake: Binduga, Powały and Bartny Dół. At the final stop, Krusznik, there is a feasting and recreational place, Zielona Karczma (Green Inn). The stops have been equipped with educational information boards by the Wigry National Park, and their names have also been established together with the national park specialists, referring to history of timber and honey exploitation. Trains stop at various stops on the way there and back. 99% of the route runs through the areas of the Wigry National Park, including 70% through forests.

The official opening of the renovated railway took place on 19 May 2001. The narrow-gauge railway quickly became a major tourist attraction of the Wigry National Park and the Suwałki Region. Even before 2003, year-round operations were launched for organised groups, especially schools and workplaces, as part of a wider tourist offer (restaurants, guesthouses and stud farms). In the summer season from June to August 2003 alone the railway carried about 15 thousand people. That year, radio broadcasting of trains was also introduced, with recorded information about the railway and the national park played at stops. The railway runs according to the schedule every day from May to September, and outside this season it runs on request. There are three runs daily in July and August (at 10:00, 13:00 and 16:00) and two in June. In the summer, transport takes place in open carriages, outside the summer season in covered and heated ones.
