= Jinx (disambiguation) =

A jinx is a condition of bad luck possibly by way of a curse.

Jinx, The Jinx, Jynx, or Jinxed may also refer to:

== Arts and entertainment ==
=== Fictional characters ===
- Li'l Jinx, an Archie Comics character
- Jinx (DC Comics), a DC comic book character
- Jinx (G.I. Joe), a fictional character in the G.I. Joe universe
- Jinx (Known Space), a fictional world in the Known Space universe
- Agent Jinx (James Bond), a character in the James Bond universe
- Jinx, a character in the SpaceCamp universe
- Jinx, the original name of Jerry Mouse, the fictional co-protagonist of the Tom and Jerry cartoons
- Jinx, the Loose Cannon, a character in the League of Legends universe
- Jynx, a fictional species of creatures in Pokémon media
- Mr. Jinx, a character in the Martin Mystère universe
- Jinx, a character from the Netflix Series Arcane
- Jinx, the main antagonist in The Garfield Movie

=== Film and television ===
- Jinx (film), a 1919 American film
- Jinx (TV series), a British child-oriented television series
- The Jinx (TV series), an HBO true crime documentary television series about Robert Durst
- Jinxed! (1982 film), an American film starring Bette Midler
- Jinxed (2013 film), a television film

=== Gaming ===
- Jinx (children's game), children's game when two speak the same word or phrase simultaneously
- Jinx (video game), a 2003 PlayStation video game
- Brax (game), a board game also known as Jinx

=== Literature ===
- Jinx (Blackwood novel), 2013 children's novel in a trilogy by Sage Blackwood, and others by that author.
- Jinx (Cabot novel), 2007 young adult novel by Meg Cabot.
- Jinx (Image Comics), a graphic novel by Brian Michael Bendis.
- The Jinx (magazine), a magazine for mentalists and magicians published by Theodore Annemann.

=== Music ===
- Jinx (band), a Croatian pop-funk band
- Jinx, an album by The Jolts
- Jinx, an album by Kammerflimmer Kollektief
- Jinx (Quarashi album), 2002
- Jinx (Rory Gallagher album), 1982
- Jinx (Crumb album), 2019, or the title track
- Jinx (Waterparks album), 2026
- "Jinx", a song by Green Day from the 1997 album Nimrod
- "Jinx", a song by DNCE from the 2015 EP Swaay
- "The Jinx", a song by Peter and the Test Tube Babies, 1983
- "Jinx", a song by Tad from the 1991 album 8-Way Santa
- "Jinx", a song by Tuxedomoon from the 1981 album Desire

== People ==
- Michael Spinks (born 1956), American boxer nicknamed Jinx
- Jinx Falkenburg (1919–2003), model and talk radio host
- Jinx Dawson, singer with the American band Coven
- Jinx (author), nom de plume of American author and actress Gabriel McClure (born 1994)

== Other uses ==
- Jinx (chimpanzee), the world's first ice skating chimpanzee
- Jinx (clothing), stylized as J!NX, a Californian apparel company
- Jinx, a Boys' love Korean webcomic by MinGwa
- Jinx Debugger, a tool for debugging rare concurrency errors
- Jynx (genus), a Wryneck genus of birds
- Johannesburg Internet Exchange, South Africa

== See also ==
- Jinks (disambiguation)
- Jinxx (born 1986), guitarist and violinist for American rock band Black Veil Brides
- Jinkx Monsoon (born 1987), American drag queen
