= Observer effect =

Observer effect, observer bias, observation effect, or observation bias may refer to a number of concepts, some of them closely related:

- Hawthorne effect, a type of human behavior reactivity in which individuals modify an aspect of their behavior in response to their awareness of being observed
- Heisenbug, a software bug that seems to disappear or alter its behavior when one attempts to study it
- Laws of Form, a mathematical calculus between the distinction that an observer draws and the implied decision what not to observe, also described as observer dilemma
- Observer bias, one of the types of detection bias and is defined as any kind of systematic divergence from accurate facts during observation and the recording of data and information in studies
- Observer effect (information technology), the impact on the behaviour of a computer process caused by the act of observing the process while it is running
- Observer effect (physics), the disturbance of an observed system by the act of observation
- Observer-expectancy effect, a form of reactivity in which a researcher's cognitive bias causes them to subconsciously influence the participants of an experiment
- Observer's paradox, a situation in which the phenomenon being observed is unwittingly influenced by the presence of the observer/investigator

== See also ==
- Anthropic principle, a proposition in philosophy of science that emphasizes the sample selection bias introduced by the mere fact that an observer exists (also called the observation selection effect)
- Bystander effect, a social psychological theory that states that individuals are less likely to offer help to a victim in the presence of other people
- Actor–observer asymmetry, a bias one exhibits when forming attributions about the behavior of others or themselves
- Demonstration effect, an effect on the behavior of an individual caused by observation of the actions of others and their consequences
- Personal equation, the idea that different observers have different reaction times, which can introduce bias when it comes to measurements and observations
- Placebo and nocebo effects, positive and negative effects autosuggested by a patient under an inert substance or treatment
- Probe effect
- Schrödinger's cat, a thought experiment concerning quantum superposition
- Uncertainty principle, a fundamental concept in quantum mechanics
