= Jinks =

Jinks may refer to:

- Jinks (rapper), a Danish rapper, also known as Ankerstjerne
- Jinks (surname), for people with this name
- Jinks, Kentucky
- Jinks Island, an island in the Biscoe Islands
- Jinx (game), a game when 2 people say the same word unintentionally
- Jinx, a type of curse placed on a person, or a person afflicted with a similar curse
- An alternative name for knucklebones
- Captain Jinks of the Horse Marines, a 1975 opera by Jack Beeson
- Jinks, an animated orange cat on Pixie and Dixie and Mr. Jinks, a regular segment of the television series The Huckleberry Hound Show
- Steve Jinks, a character in the television series Warehouse 13

== See also ==
- Hi-Jinks
- Jinx (disambiguation)
