= Fandango (disambiguation) =

Fandango is a style of folk dance and music originating in Spain.

Fandango may also refer to:

== Arts and entertainment ==
=== Film ===
- Fandango, a 1928 film featuring Anita Garvin
- Fandango (1949 film), a French musical film
- Fandango, a 1969 film directed by John Hayes
- Fandango (1985 film), an American film directed by Kevin Reynolds
- Fandango, a 2000 German film directed by Matthias Glasner

=== Music ===
- Fandango (Mexican band), a 1984–1991 girl group
- Fandango (American band), a 1970s pop rock band
- Nick Simper's Fandango, a 1977–1983 British band featuring Nick Simper
- Fandango (Herb Alpert album), 1982
- Fandango (The Phoenix Foundation album), 2013
- Fandango!, an album by ZZ Top, 1975
- "Fandango", a song by DJ Quik from Trauma, 2005
- "Fandango", a song by Pain of Salvation from Remedy Lane, 2002

=== Other media ===
- Fandango (game show), a 1983–1989 American game show
- "Fandango", an 1891 poem by Vilhelm Krag
- Fandango Ballroom, the fictional dance hall in the musical Sweet Charity
- Grim Fandango, a 1998 video game

== Companies ==
- Fandango (Italian company), an entertainment company
- Fandango (streaming service), an American digital video store and streaming service

== Other uses ==
- Fandango (color), a colour in the fuchsia range
- Fandango (wrestler), Curtis Jonathan Hussey (born 1981), American professional wrestler
- Fandango on core, data corruption in computer memory due to a runaway pointer
- Fandango Pass, Warner Mountains, Modoc County, California, US
- Fandangos (snack), a brand of puffcorn sold in Brazil

== See also ==
- Fanny Dango (1878–1972), British comedienne, singer and actress
