= Ateny =

Ateny is the name for Athens in several Slavic languages.

It may also refer to:

- Ateny, Podlaskie Voivodeship, Poland
- Kraków, the Polish Athens (Polskie Ateny)
- Nowe Ateny, the first Polish-language encyclopedia
