= Blizna =

Blizna may refer to:

- Blizna V-2 missile launch site, a World War II Nazi location
- Blizna, Subcarpathian Voivodeship, a village in southeastern Poland
- Blizna, Podlaskie Voivodeship, a village in northeastern Poland
- Blizna (film), a 1976 Polish film named The Scar in English
- Blizna (river), a tributary to Rospuda
- Blizna, Bosnia and Herzegovina, a village near Rudo
- Blizna Donja, a village near Marina, Croatia
- Blizna Gornja, a village near Marina, Croatia
- Blizna, Montenegro, a village in Podgorica Municipality
