= Cisówek =

Cisówek may refer to the following places:

- Cisówek, Augustów County in Podlaskie Voivodeship (north-east Poland)
- Cisówek, Suwałki County in Podlaskie Voivodeship (north-east Poland)
- Cisówek, Warmian-Masurian Voivodeship (north Poland)
