= McVilly =

McVilly is a surname. Notable people with the surname include:

- Cecil McVilly (1889–1964), Australian rower and soldier
- Don McVilly (1920–1996), Australian rules footballer
- Graham McVilly (1948–2002), Australian cyclist
- Ray McVilly (born 1938), Australian rules footballer
- Richard McVilly (1862–1949), New Zealand civil servant
