= Walne (disambiguation) =

Walne is a village in Poland.

Walne may also refer to:

== People ==
- Adam Walne, English rugby league footballer
- Jordan Walne, English rugby league footballer
- Kathleen Walne, English artist
