= Kopanica =

Kopanica may refer to:

== Places ==
Germany

- Köpenick, Berlin
  - Duchy of Kopanica, a former polity based in Köpenick

North Macedonia

- Kopanica, Saraj

Poland

- Kopanica, Gmina Nowinka in Podlaskie Voivodeship
- Kopanica, Gmina Płaska in Podlaskie Voivodeship
- Kopanica, Greater Poland Voivodeship
- Kopanica, West Pomeranian Voivodeship

== Other uses ==
- Kopanitsa, a Balkan folk dance
