= Nowe Gatne =

- Village
- Location within Poland
- Coordinates: 53°56′41″N 22°57′58″E
- Country: Poland
- Voivodeship: Podlaskie
- County: Augustów
- Gmina: Nowinka

Nowe Gatne (Polish pronunciation: [ˈnɔvɛ ˈɡatnɛ]) is a village in the administrative district of Gmina Nowinka, within Augustów County, Podlaskie Voivodeship, in north-eastern Poland.
