= Strękowizna =

Village in Podlaskie Voivodeship, Poland

- Village
- Location within Poland
- Coordinates: 53°55′N 23°2′E
- Country: Poland
- Voivodeship: Podlaskie
- County: Augustów
- Gmina: Nowinka

Strękowizna [strɛŋkɔˈvizna] is a village in the administrative district of Gmina Nowinka, within Augustów County, Podlaskie Voivodeship, in north-eastern Poland.
