= Zdzisław Krasnodębski =

Zdzisław Krasnodębski, alias Król (10 July 1904 – 3 July 1980), was a Polish pilot and the founder and commander of No. 303 Polish Fighter Squadron, and the leader of the 1st Fighter Group.

== Early life and career ==
Krasnodębski was born on 10 July 1904 in Wola Osowińska. After schooling in Siedlce, Łomża and Warsaw in Poland, he began his military service at the age of 16 in the Warsaw 201 Infantry Regiment in 1920 as a volunteer during the Polish-Soviet War. After leaving military service he joined Cadets Corp No. 1 in Lwów, where he passed matura (high school graduation certificate). After graduation, he was accepted to the Officer's Flight School in Grudziądz, which was subsequently relocated to Dęblin.

Krasnodębski graduated on 15 August 1928 as a Second Lieutenant observer and joined the 1st Flight Regiment in Warsaw. In Spring 1929 he completed his basic flight training in Dęblin. In May 1930 he completed advanced flight training in the 2nd Flight Regiment fighter wing in Kraków. Eventually he was assigned to Tadeusz Kościuszko 111th Fighter Squadron of the 1st Flight Regiment in Warsaw.

Krasnodębski continued his career in the Warsaw regiment, spending a few years as second lieutenant, and later as a unit commander, actively participating in his unit's actions. In October 1933 he was among the pilots of the 111th visiting Bucharest. In May 1935, he was a member of delegation of the 1st Flight Regiment to Marshal Józef Piłsudski's funeral. Five months later, as Lieutenant, Krasnodębski participated in a fighter pilot competition in Grudziądz.

In November 1935, Krasnodębski assumed command of the 111th Fighter Squadron. In the mid-1930s, Polish airspace was frequently violated by unauthorised foreign aircraft incursions. In 1936 Krasnodębski's squadron moved to the airfield at Sarny. Its pilots carried out numerous interception sorties in the Polesie region, where the Polish border was often crossed by Soviet Air Force reconnaissance aircraft. During one incident, Krasnodębski gave the order to shoot at one such aircraft, when the pilot ignored Polish radio calls. Lt. Witold Urbanowicz and Lt. Nałęcz were pilots participating in that event.

== Beginning of World War II ==
On 1 September 1939 Captain Krasnodębski was the commander of III/I Fighter Squadron. During the last days of August the squadron was based at an airfield in Zielonka near Warsaw. Predictions said that the squadron's mother airfield, Okęcie, would be heavily bombarded on the first day of World War II. During those first days, the squadron had an establishment of 23 fully combat serviceable PZL P.11.

On the first day of the war, the squadron pilots flew from the early morning, intercepting bomber aircraft and engaging in combat with escorting fighters. During one such sortie, Krasnodębski's wing shot down a German Dornier Do 17, which fell to the ground in flames, killing the German crew.

On 3 September six PZL P-11c of Polish 112th Fighter Escadrille, headed by Krasnodębski took off against German Bf 110 fighters. In combat over Wyszków, Krasnodębski was shot down and forced to bail out. The German pilot who shot him down attempted to finish Krasnodębski off as he slowly parachute to the ground, but Lt. Arsen Cebrzynski saw this and shot down the Luftwaffe pilot instead. Leutnant Barents, a veteran of the Luftwaffe's "Legion Condor", bailed out and became a POW.

After treatment for burns, Krasnodębski continued to command III/I Squadron, until the Soviet invasion on Poland on 17 September 1939. He led nine serviceable planes to cross the border with Romania, together with other Polish pilots. The Warsaw Pursuit Squadron destroyed 34 Luftwaffe planes and damaged 29 more, but at a cost of 36 of its own planes.

Many Polish aircrew managed to make their way to France, to continue the fight with French Forces, although by late May 1940 and the Battle of France they had to evacuate to the U.K.

== Battle of Britain ==
Between 18 and 24 June 1940, over 30,000 Polish military personnel – about 8,500 aircrew – escaped France by various routes and made their way to England. Most of the Polish fighter pilots were assigned to the RAF's newly formed No. 303 Squadron, commanded by Squadron Leader Ronald Gustave Kellett, who shared command responsibilities with Krasnodębski.

Lt. Witold Paszkiewicz scored the Squadron's first kill; a Bf 110 of 4./ZG 76, during a training flight on 30 August 1940. Fighter Command thus then permitted the Polish Squadron to enter front line duty. The next day, Polish fighters went on their first mission over England – destroying six Bf 109s with no losses.

On 2 September the Squadron intercepted two German formations over Kent. Ten Bf 109s of 4 Staffel, Jagdgeschwader 77 attacked the Poles out of the sun. The Germans broke off and turned toward France.

On 6 September 1940 in heavy combat, 303 claimed five Bf 109 destroyed, but among the Polish losses this day were both squadron leaders; Krasnodębski was badly burned, and Sqn Ldr Kellet wounded, while two other pilots were shot down.

Leading Yellow Section, Krasnodębski was about to engage a bomber when an unseen Bf 109 behind him opened fire. 20 mm cannon shells hit his fuel tank, spilling burning petrol into the cockpit. Blinded by the fire, Krasnodębski managed to invert his aircraft, unfasten his safety harness, rip off his oxygen mask, open the canopy and drop clear. Careful not to pull his ripcord until he had dropped clear of the combat area to prevent a recurrence of being shot up in his chute, he waited until about 10,000 feet before trying to open his parachute, but initially could not find the ripcord.

Soon after the chute opened he heard an approaching fighter; a Hurricane flown by Witold Urbanowicz, who saw the yellow Mae West life jacket worn by RAF pilots and veered off to circle the parachute all the way down.

Krasnodębski landed outside Farnborough, where members of the local Home Guard surrounded him. Although Krasnodębski spoke little English, the old men identified that he was not German and called for an ambulance that took him to the local hospital. Due to his severe burns he spent several years in hospital, and medical staff predicted he would never fly again.

Krasnodębski's No. 303 Squadron claimed 126 kills during the Battle of Britain, the most of any RAF Squadron in this period.

== Late life ==
Krasnodębski died on 3 July 1980 in Toronto.
