= Podnowinka =

- Village
- Location within Poland
- Coordinates: 53°54′08″N 23°00′51″E
- Country: Poland
- Voivodeship: Podlaskie
- County: Augustów
- Gmina: Nowinka

Podnowinka [pɔdnɔˈviŋka] is a village in the administrative district of Gmina Nowinka, within Augustów County, Podlaskie Voivodeship, in north-eastern Poland.
