= Olszanka, Augustów County =

Olszanka
- Village
- Location within Poland
- Coordinates: 53°54′12″N 23°00′55″E
- Country: Poland
- Voivodeship: Podlaskie
- County: Augustów
- Gmina: Nowinka

Olszanka [ɔlˈʂaŋka] is a village in the administrative district of Gmina Nowinka, within Augustów County, Podlaskie Voivodeship, in north-eastern Poland.

== Notable people ==
- Witold Urbanowicz, Polish fighter ace of World War II
