= Observation =

Active acquisition of information from a primary source

Observation in the natural sciences refers to the active acquisition of information from a primary source. It involves the act of noticing or perceiving phenomena and gathering data based on direct engagement with the subject of study.

In living organisms, observation typically occurs through the senses. In science, it often extends beyond unaided perception, involving the use of scientific instruments to detect, measure, and record data. This enables the observation of phenomena not accessible to human senses alone.

Observations in science are typically categorized as either qualitative or quantitative:

- Qualitative observations describe characteristics that are not expressed numerically, such as color, texture, or behavior.
- Quantitative observations involve numerical measurements, obtained through counting or using instruments to assign values to observed phenomena.

The term observation may refer both to the process of observing and to the information recorded as a result of that process.

== Science ==
The scientific method requires observations of natural phenomena to formulate and test hypotheses. The method involves an iterative series of steps intended to generate and refine scientific knowledge:

1. Ask a question about a phenomenon
2. Make observations of the phenomenon
3. Formulate a hypothesis that tentatively answers the question
4. Predict logical, observable consequences of the hypothesis that have not yet been investigated
5. Test the hypothesis' predictions through experiments, observational study, field study, or simulations
6. Draw a conclusion from the collected data, revise the hypothesis, or propose a new one, and repeat the process
7. Write a descriptive method of observation and the results or conclusions reached
8. Submit the findings for peer review by researchers experienced in the same area of study

Each step depends on reliable and reproducible observations, which form the basis for scientific reasoning and validation of results.

Observations play a role in both the second and fifth steps of the scientific method. However, the principle of reproducibility requires that observations made by different individuals be comparable and consistent. Human sense impressions are subjective and yield qualitative data, which are difficult to standardize, record, or compare across observers. To address this limitation, the use of measurement was developed as a means of producing objective, quantitative observations.

Measurement involves comparing the observed phenomenon to a standard unit, which may be defined by an artifact, a process, or a shared convention. This standard must be reproducible and accessible to all observers. The result of the measurement process is a numerical value that represents the number of standard units corresponding to the observation.

By reducing observations to numerical values, measurement enables consistent documentation and facilitates comparison. Two observations that yield the same measured value are considered equivalent within the resolution or precision of the process.

Human senses are limited in range and accuracy and are subject to errors in perception, such as those caused by optical illusions. These limitations affect the reliability and precision of unaided observations in scientific inquiry.

To overcome these limitations, various scientific instruments have been developed to extend and enhance human observational capabilities. Instruments such as weighing scales, clocks, telescopes, microscopes, thermometers, cameras, and tape recorders assist in making more accurate and consistent measurements of phenomena that are within the range of human perception.

In addition, some instruments make it possible to detect and record phenomena that are otherwise imperceptible to the senses. These include devices like indicator dyes, voltmeters, spectrometers, infrared cameras, oscilloscopes, interferometers, Geiger counters, and radio receivers. Such tools enable scientists to observe events and processes occurring beyond the limits of natural human perception.

One challenge encountered across scientific disciplines is that the act of observation can influence the process being observed, potentially altering the outcome. This phenomenon is known as the observer effect. For instance, measuring the air pressure in an automobile tire typically requires letting out a small amount of air, which in turn changes the pressure being measured.

In many areas of science, the effects of observation can be minimized to negligible levels through the use of advanced and more precise instruments. These tools help ensure that the measurement process interferes as little as possible with the system under study.

When considered as a physical process, all forms of observation—whether performed by humans or instruments—involve some form of amplification. As such, observation is a thermodynamically irreversible process that results in an increase in entropy.

== Paradoxes ==
In certain scientific fields, the results of observation vary depending on factors that are not typically significant in everyday experience. These variations are often illustrated through apparent "paradoxes", where an event appears different when observed from two distinct perspectives, seemingly contradicting "common sense".

- Relativity: In relativistic physics, which addresses phenomena at velocities close to the speed of light, different observers may record different values for properties such as length, time, and mass, depending on their relative velocity with respect to the object being observed. For example, in the twin paradox, one twin undertakes a high-speed journey and returns younger than the twin who remained on Earth. This outcome is consistent with the principles of relativity: time passes more slowly in reference frames moving at high velocities relative to an observer. In relativistic physics, all observations must be described in relation to the frame of reference of the observer.
- Quantum mechanics: In quantum mechanics, which examines systems at atomic and subatomic scales, it is fundamentally impossible to observe a system without influencing it. In this context, the observer becomes part of the system being measured. Quantum systems are described by a wave function, which often exists in a quantum superposition of multiple possible states. When an observation or measurement is made, the system is always found in a definite state—not in a mixture. The act of measurement appears to cause the wave function collapse, transitioning the system from a superposition to a single, determinate state. This process is referred to as observation or measurement, regardless of whether it is part of a deliberate experimental setup.

== Biases ==
Human senses do not function like an impartial recording device such as a video camcorder. Perception occurs through a complex, largely unconscious process of abstraction, in which certain elements of sensory input are selected and retained, while others are discarded.

This selection process depends on an internal model of the world—referred to in psychology as a schema—that is shaped by past experiences. Sensory information is interpreted and stored based on this schema. During recall, gaps in memory may be unconsciously filled with information consistent with the schema, a process known as reconstructive memory.

The degree of attention given to different aspects of a perceptual experience is influenced by an individual's internal value system, which prioritizes information based on perceived importance. As a result, two individuals observing the same event may remember it differently, potentially disagreeing on factual details. This subjectivity is a known limitation of eyewitness testimony, which research has shown to be frequently unreliable.

In scientific practice, rigorous methods are employed to minimize such observational biases. These include careful documentation of experimental data, distinguishing clearly between raw observations and inferred conclusions, and implementing procedures such as blind and double blind experiment designs to control for subjective influence.

Several of the more important ways observations can be affected by human psychology are given below.

=== Confirmation bias ===
Human observations are biased toward confirming the observer's conscious and unconscious expectations and view of the world; we "see what we expect to see". In psychology, this is called confirmation bias. Since the object of scientific research is the discovery of new phenomena, this bias can and has caused new discoveries to be overlooked; one example is the discovery of x-rays. It can also result in erroneous scientific support for widely held cultural myths, on the other hand, as in the scientific racism that supported ideas of racial superiority in the early 20th century.

=== Processing bias ===
Modern scientific instruments frequently perform extensive processing of "observations" before the results are presented to human observers. With the increasing use of computerized instruments, it can be difficult to determine the boundary between the act of observation and the interpretation or conclusion drawn from that data.

This issue is particularly relevant in the context of digital image processing, where images used as experimental data in scientific publications are sometimes enhanced to emphasize specific features. While such enhancement can aid in highlighting relevant aspects of the data, it may also inadvertently reinforce the researcher's hypothesis, introducing a form of bias that is challenging to quantify.

In response, some journals have established explicit guidelines regarding permissible types of image processing in published research. To safeguard against processing bias, many computerized systems are designed to store copies of the unprocessed or "raw" data captured by sensors. Likewise, scientific best practices require that original, unaltered images used as research data be preserved and made available upon request.

== See also ==
- Deixis
- Extrospection
- Introspection
- List of cognitive biases
- Metaphysics of presence
- Naturalistic observation
- Observation unit
- Observational astronomy
- Observational error
- Observational learning
- Observational study
- Observable quantity
- Observations and Measurements
- Observatory
- Observer effect
- Observed value
- Noumenon
- Present
- Self
- Theory ladenness
- Uncertainty principle
- Unobservable
