= Osińska Buda =

- Village
- Location within Poland
- Coordinates: 53°59′N 22°54′E
- Country: Poland
- Voivodeship: Podlaskie
- County: Augustów
- Gmina: Nowinka

Osińska Buda [ɔˈɕiɲska ˈbuda] is a village in the administrative district of Gmina Nowinka, within Augustów County, Podlaskie Voivodeship, in north-eastern Poland.
