= Podkrólówek =

Village in Gmina Nowinka, Poland

- Village
- Location within Poland
- Coordinates: 53°54′11″N 23°00′54″E
- Country: Poland
- Voivodeship: Podlaskie
- County: Augustów
- Gmina: Nowinka

Podkrólówek [pɔtkruˈluvɛk] is a village in the administrative district of Gmina Nowinka, within Augustów County, Podlaskie Voivodeship, in north-eastern Poland.
