= Pijawne Wielkie =

- Village
- Location within Poland
- Coordinates: 53°59′48″N 22°54′41″E
- Country: Poland
- Voivodeship: Podlaskie
- County: Augustów
- Gmina: Nowinka

Pijawne Wielkie [piˈjavnɛ ˈvjɛlkʲɛ] is a village in the administrative district of Gmina Nowinka, within Augustów County, Podlaskie Voivodeship, in north-eastern Poland.
