= Jinks (surname) =

Jinks is a surname and occasional given name. Notable people with the name include:

- Catherine Jinks (born 1963), Australian fiction writer
- Cody Jinks (born 1980), American country music singer/songwriter
- Dan Jinks (active 1997 onwards), American film and TV producer
- Derek Jinks, American lawyer
- Fred Jinks (1880–1940), Australian rules footballer
- Fred Jinks (cricketer) (1909–1996), Australian cricketer
- Jimmy Jinks (1916–1981), English footballer
- John Jinks (politician) (1871–1934), Irish politician
- John L. Jinks (1929–1987), British geneticist
- Mike Jinks (born 1972), American football coach
- Sam Jinks (born 1973) Australian sculptor
- Sue Jinks-Robertson (born 20th century), American professor
- Jinks Coleman (1944–2000), American women's basketball coach
