= Szczebra =

- Village
- Location within Poland
- Coordinates: 53°54′N 22°58′E
- Country: Poland
- Voivodeship: Podlaskie
- County: Augustów
- Gmina: Nowinka
- Population: 280

Szczebra ([ˈʂt͡ʂɛbra]; Lithuanian: Ščebra) is a village in the administrative district of Gmina Nowinka, within Augustów County, Podlaskie Voivodeship, in north-eastern Poland.

== Sources ==
- VLKK (2002). "Atvirkštinis lietuvių kalboje vartojamų tradicinių Lenkijos vietovardžių formų sąrašas" (PDF). VLKK (in Lithuanian).
