= Nowinka, Augustów County =

Nowinka
- Village
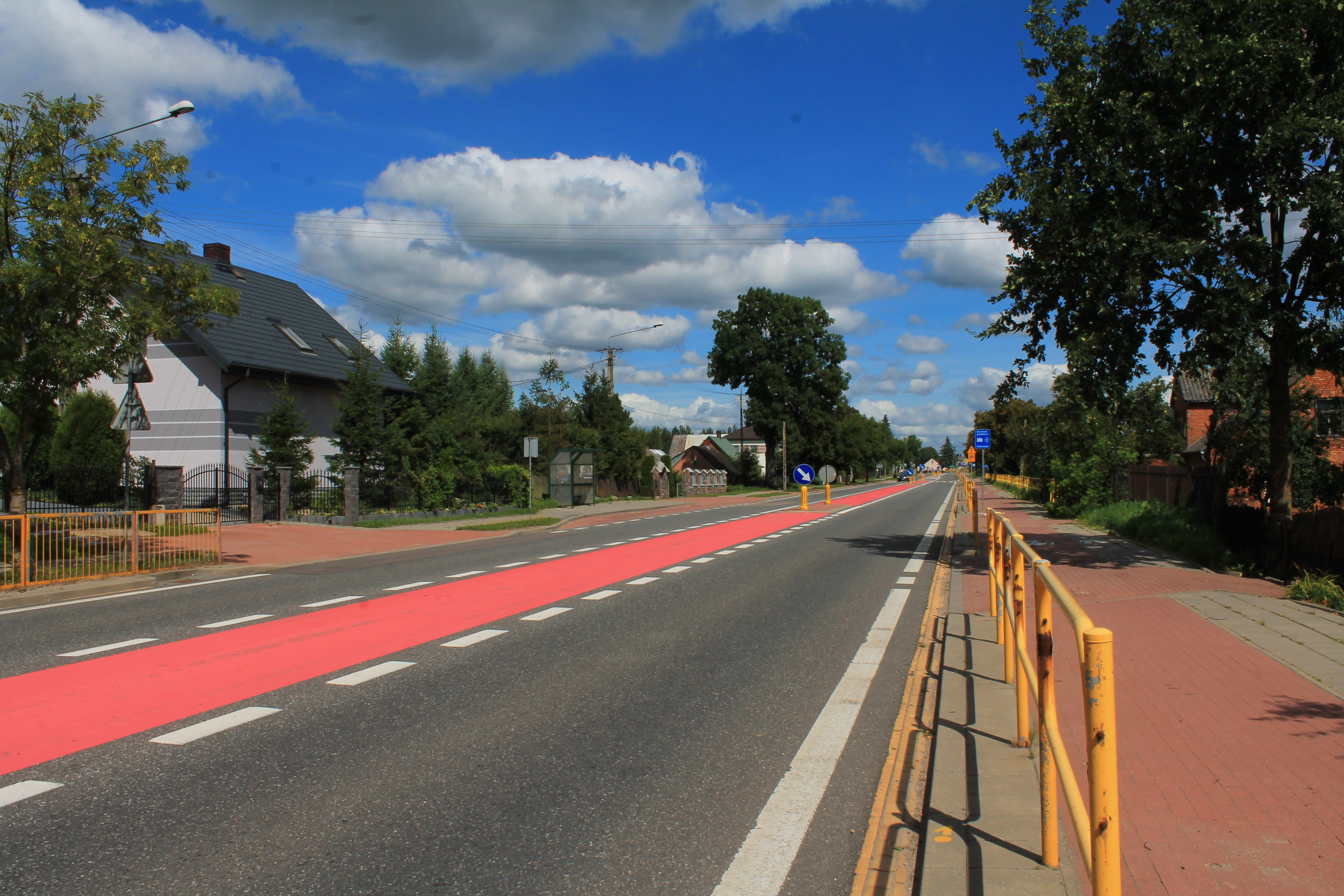
- August 2018

- Location within Poland
- Coordinates: 53°56′10″N 22°58′44″E
- Country: Poland
- Voivodeship: Podlaskie
- County: Augustów
- Gmina: Nowinka
- Population: 300

Nowinka [nɔˈvinka] is a village in Augustów County, Podlaskie Voivodeship, in north-eastern Poland. It is the seat of the gmina (administrative district) called Gmina Nowinka.
