= Stare Gatne =

- Village
- Location within Poland
- Coordinates: 53°59′47″N 22°51′42″E
- Country: Poland
- Voivodeship: Podlaskie
- County: Augustów
- Gmina: Nowinka

Stare Gatne (Polish pronunciation: [ˈstarɛ ˈɡatnɛ]) is a village in the administrative district of Gmina Nowinka, within Augustów County, Podlaskie Voivodeship, in north-eastern Poland.
