= Barszczowa Góra =

- Village
- Location within Poland
- Coordinates: 53°58′N 22°59′E
- Country: Poland
- Voivodeship: Podlaskie
- County: Augustów
- Gmina: Nowinka
- Population: 70

Barszczowa Góra [barʂˈt͡ʂɔva ˈɡura] is a village in the administrative district of Gmina Nowinka, within Augustów County, Podlaskie Voivodeship, in north-eastern Poland.
