= Gmina Nowinka =

Gmina Nowinka Nowinka Commune
- Gmina
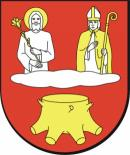
- Coat of arms

- Gmina Nowinka within the Augustów County
- Coordinates (Nowinka): 53°56′10″N 22°58′44″E
- Country: Poland
- Voivodeship: Podlaskie
- County: Augustów
- Seat: Nowinka

Area
  - Total: 203.84 km^{2} (78.70 sq mi)

Population (2019-06-30)
  - Total: 2,904
  - Density: 14.25/km^{2} (36.90/sq mi)

Gmina Nowinka, is a rural gmina (administrative district) in Augustów County, Podlaskie Voivodeship, in north-eastern Poland. Its seat is the village of Nowinka, which lies approximately 10 kilometres (6 mi) north of Augustów and 92 km (57 mi) north of the regional capital Białystok.

The gmina covers an area of 203.84 square kilometres (78.7 sq mi), and as of 2019 its total population is 2,904.

== Villages ==
Gmina Nowinka contains the villages and settlements of Ateny, Barszczowa Góra, Blizna, Bryzgiel, Busznica, Cisówek, Danowskie, Józefowo, Juryzdyka, Kopanica, Krusznik, Monkinie, Nowe Gatne, Nowinka, Olszanka, Osińska Buda, Pijawne Polskie, Pijawne Wielkie, Podkrólówek, Podnowinka, Powały, Sokolne, Stare Gatne, Strękowizna, Szczeberka, Szczebra, Szczepki, Tobołowo, Walne and Zakąty.

== Neighbouring gminas ==
Gmina Nowinka is bordered by the town of Augustów and by the gminas of Augustów, Giby, Krasnopol, Płaska, Raczki and Suwałki.
