= 1st Fighter Group "Kr" =

- Active: 17 May – 19 June 1940
- Allegiance: Polish government-in-exile
- Branch: Polish Air Forces in France
- Role: Fighter air defence
- Size: 4 pilots (until 12 June 1940); 7 pilots (after 12 June 1940)
- Garrison/HQ: Bordeaux; Châteaudun; Étampes; Limoges
- Engagements: Second World War: Battle of France
- Commander: Zdzisław Krasnodębski

The 1st Fighter Group "Kr" (Polish: I Klucz Kominowy „Kr”) was an air unit of the Polish Air Forces in France, formed on 17 May 1940, being subordinated to the Fighter Squadron 1/55 of the French Air Force. It was commanded by major Zdzisław Krasnodębski. The unit served in the Battle of France during the Second World War, being stationed at the back of the front lines, with bases in the towns of Bordeaux, Châteaudun, Étampes, and Limoges. It was disbanded on 19 June 1940, shortly before the capitulation of France. Its pilots later joined the No. 303 Squadron of the Royal Air Force in the United Kingdom.

== History ==
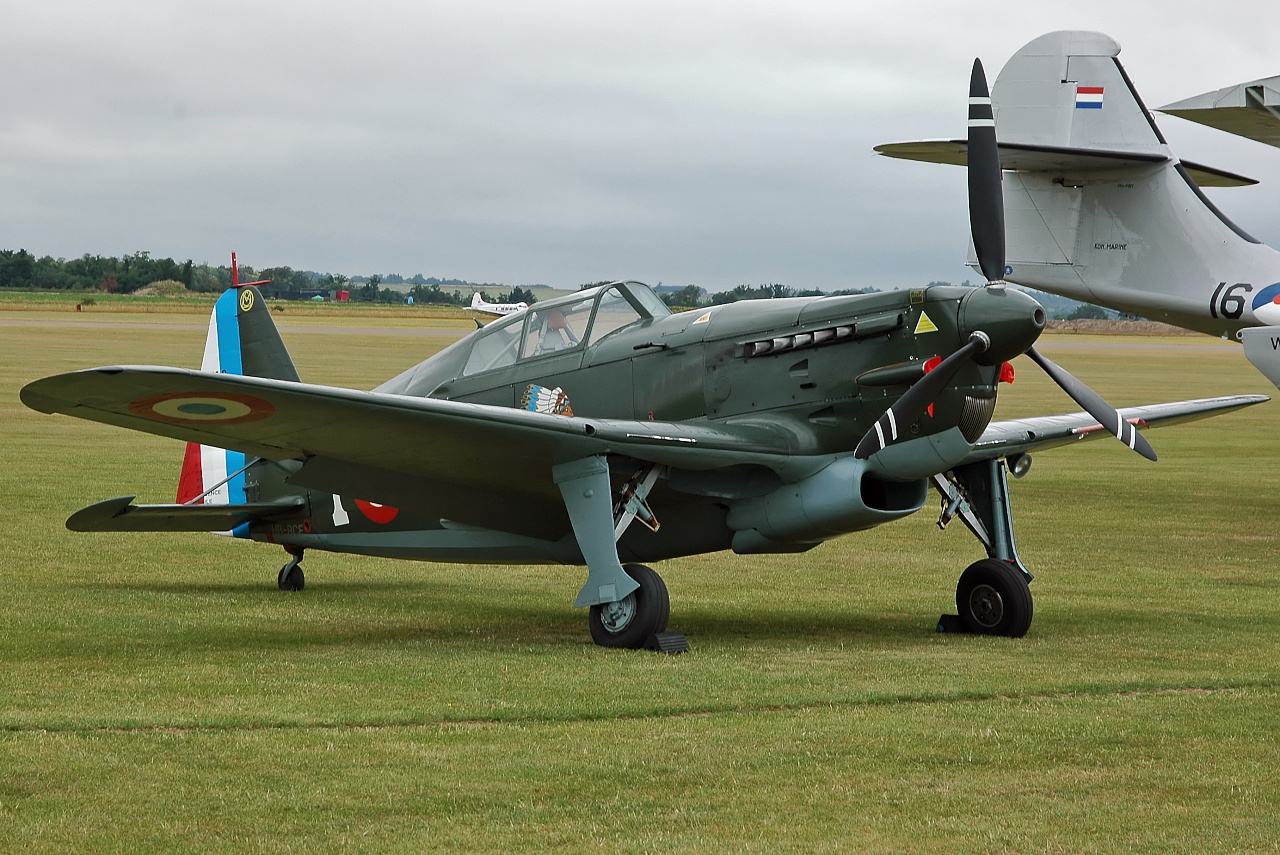
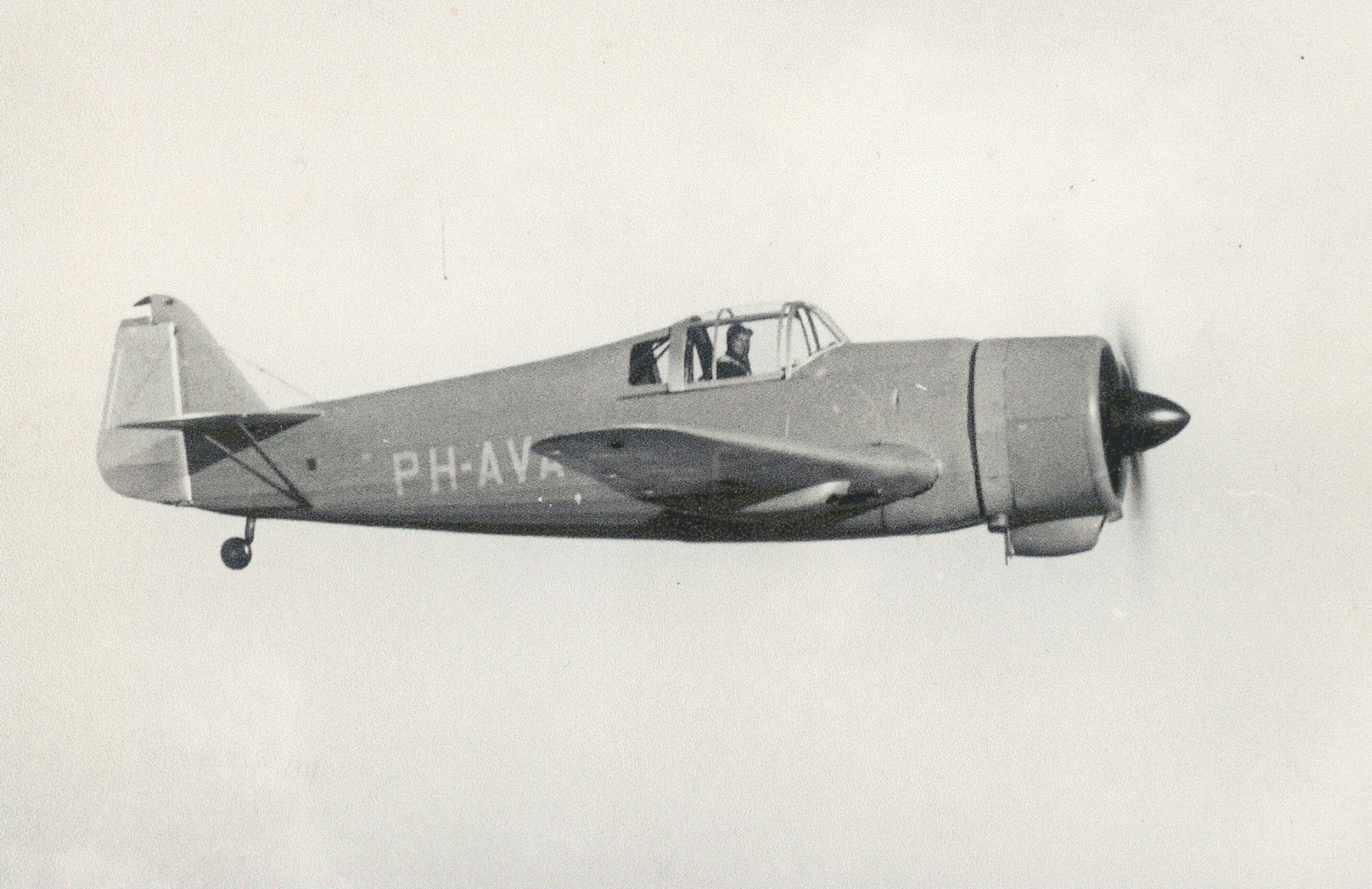
Morane-Saulnier M.S.406 (top) and Koolhoven F.K.58 (bottom), the two types of fighter aircraft used by the unit.

The 1st Fighter Group was formed on 17 May 1940, during the Battle of France in the Second World War. It was under the command of the Polish Air Forces in France, being subordinated to the Fighter Squadron 1/55 of the French Air Force. The unit was commanded by major Zdzisław Krasnodębski. It was originally equipped with the Morane-Saulnier M.S.406 fighter aircraft, and later also with Koolhoven F.K.58.

It was formed and stationed in the commune of Châteaudun, France, behind the front lines. The ineffectiveness of the French command system caused the crews to be sent for missions too late, leaving them unable to intercept the enemy. The repeat of such situations prompted major Krasnodębski to request that Polish pilots be sent exclusively with Czechoslovak pilots, as he and his subordinates felt the French pilots lacked the will to fight. On 18 and 20 May, the unit moved to the aerodrome in Étampes near Paris. The unit participated in its first air battle on 3 June 1940, when it intercepted German aircraft while they were bombing an airfield in Châteaudun. That day, pilot Stanisław Karubin achieved the unit's only victory, shooting down a Dornier Do 17 bomber aircraft.

On 12 June 1940, the unit joined the group commanded by lieutenant Franciszek Skiba. In the last days of the Battle of France, the group patrolled the area around the engine factories in Limoges, and between 16 and 17 June, it took part in the defence of Bordeaux. Shortly prior to the capitulation of France, the pilots of the unit flew to the city of Rochefort, from where they were transported via land to the port in La Rochelle, which was an assembly point for Polish soldiers. On 19 June, they boarded the ship Alderpool, which arrived in Plymouth, England on 22 June. The pilots were later assigned to the No. 303 Squadron of the Royal Air Force.

== Members ==
- major Zdzisław Krasnodębski (commander)
- second lieutenant Jan Zumbach
- corporal Marian Bełc
- corporal Stanisław Karubin
- lieutenant Franciszek Skiba (since 12 June 1940)
- lieutenant Eugeniusz Antolak (since 12 June 1940)
- platoon leader Marcin Machowiak (since 12 June 1940)
