= Krusznik =

- Village
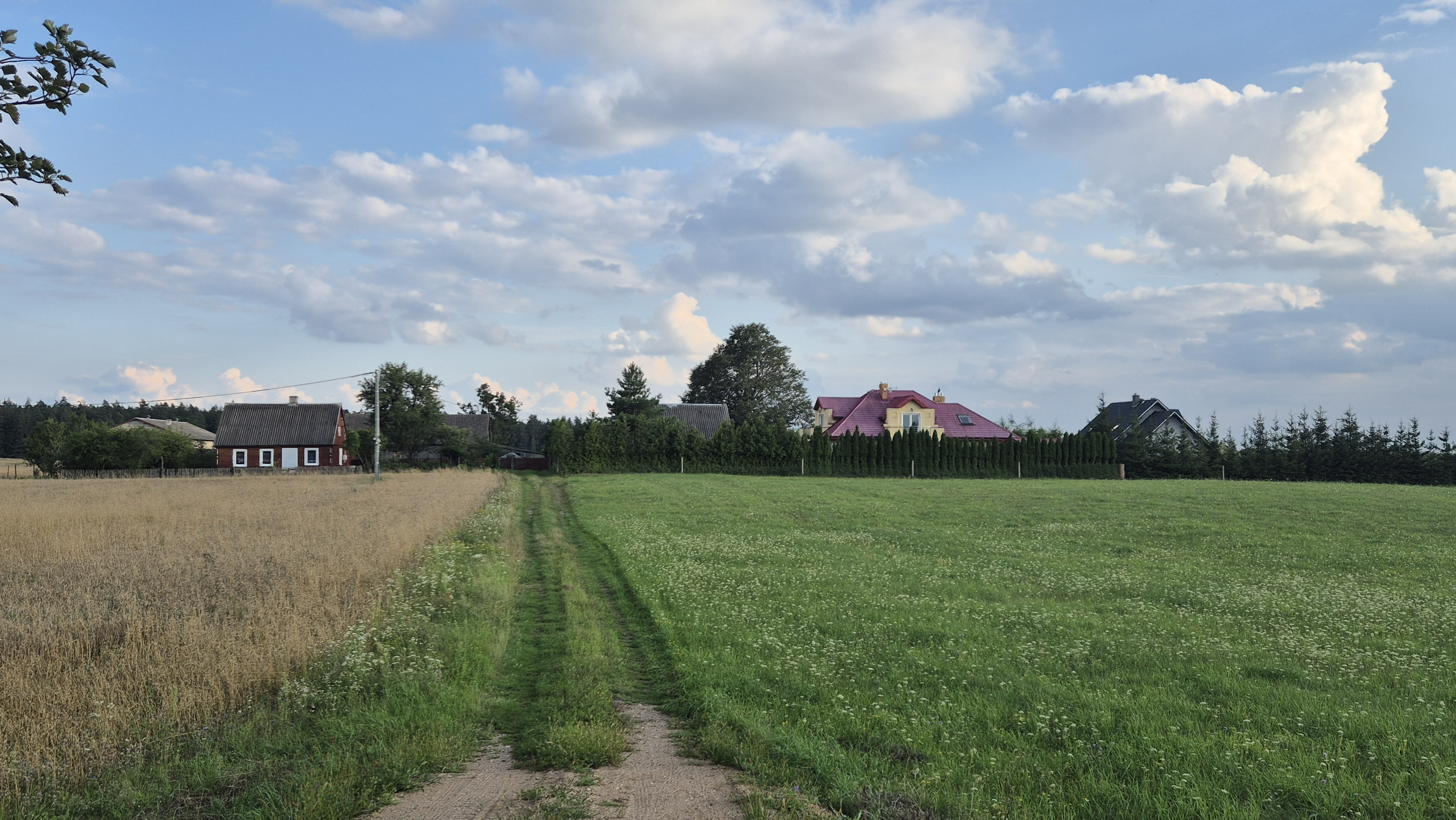

- Location within Poland
- Coordinates: 53°59′39″N 23°5′52″E
- Country: Poland
- Voivodeship: Podlaskie
- County: Augustów
- Gmina: Nowinka

Krusznik [ˈkruʂnik] is a village in the administrative district of Gmina Nowinka, within Augustów County, Podlaskie Voivodeship, in north-eastern Poland.
