= Doris Spiegel =

American artist

- Born: June 8, 1901; New York, New York
- Died: August 10, 1996 (aged 95)
- Known for: Illustration, Printmaking
- Spouse: Jerome Rozen (m. 1948; died in 1987)

Cover of Paris to the Life

Doris (D. S.) Spiegel (1901-1996) was an American artist known for her magazine and book illustrations as well as her etchings.

== Biography ==
Spiegel was born on June 8, 1901, in New York City. She worked as a secretary for Blanche Knopf at the publishing house of Alfred A. Knopf. She began sketching on the New York subway and subsequently enrolled in the Art Students League of New York. In 1928 she received a Guggenheim Fellowship which she used to travel to France and Italy to capture street scenes. She spent about two years living in France. In 1933 her illustrations for the book Paris to the Life: A Sketch-book was published. The text for the book was written by Paul Morand.

Spiegel went on to provide illustrations for The Forum, The New Yorker, and The Saturday Review. She also created prints, which she exhibited at the Art Institute of Chicago, the Library of Congress, the National Academy of Design, the Philadelphia Art Alliance, and the Society of American Etchers.

In the 1948 she married fellow illustrator Jerome Rozen (1895-1987). She was his second wife.

Spiegel died on August 10, 1996. Her work is in the collection of the Library of Congress and the Metropolitan Museum of Art.
