= Ted Thomas (footballer, born 1922) =

Australian rules footballer (born 1922)

Personal information
- Full name: Edward Joseph Thomas
- Born: 19 February 1922
- Died: 11 August 1996 (aged 74)
- Height: 173 cm (5 ft 8 in)
- Weight: 76 kg (168 lb)

Playing career^{1}
Years	Club	Games (Goals)
1944–45	North Melbourne	11 (0)
- ^{1} Playing statistics correct to the end of 1945.

Edward Joseph Thomas (19 February 1922 – 11 August 1996) was an Australian rules footballer who played with North Melbourne in the Victorian Football League (VFL).
