= Tobołowo =

- Village
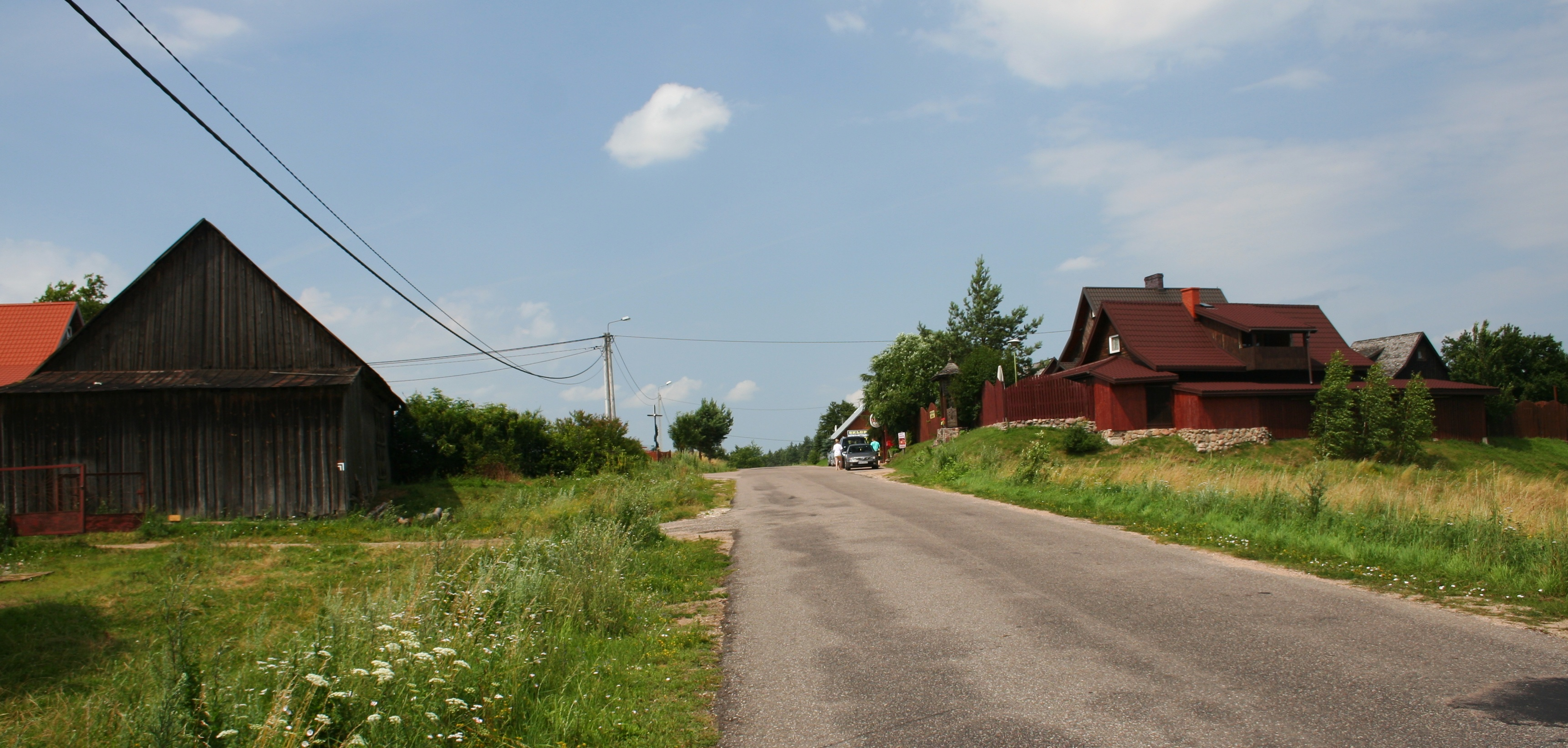

- Location within Poland
- Coordinates: 53°59′N 23°10′E
- Country: Poland
- Voivodeship: Podlaskie
- County: Augustów
- Gmina: Nowinka

Tobołowo [tɔbɔˈwɔvɔ] is a village in the administrative district of Gmina Nowinka, within Augustów County, Podlaskie Voivodeship, in north-eastern Poland.
