= Owen Zinko =

Australian rules footballer

Personal information
- Full name: Owen Zinko
- Born: 10 April 1945
- Died: 19 August 1996 (aged 51)
- Original teams: St Pats, Sale
- Height: 179 cm (5 ft 10 in)
- Weight: 79 kg (174 lb)

Playing career^{1}
Years	Club	Games (Goals)
1963–64	Melbourne	3 (3)
- ^{1} Playing statistics correct to the end of 1964.

Owen Zinko (10 April 1945 – 19 August 1996) was an Australian rules footballer who played with Melbourne in the Victorian Football League (VFL).
