= Brendon O'Donnell =

Australian rules footballer, born 1917

Personal information
- Full name: Brendon Bernard O'Donnell
- Born: 12 April 1917; St Kilda, Victoria
- Died: 23 August 1996 (aged 79); Gold Coast, Queensland
- Original team: St Kilda CYMS (CYMSFA)
- Height: 191 cm (6 ft 3 in)
- Weight: 83 kg (183 lb)

Playing career^{1}
Years	Club	Games (Goals)
1939, 1945	St Kilda	3 (4)
- ^{1} Playing statistics correct to the end of 1945.

Brendon Bernard O'Donnell (12 April 1917 – 23 August 1996) was an Australian rules footballer who played with St Kilda in the Victorian Football League (VFL).
