= Jan Holleman =

Dutch footballer (1918–1996)

Personal information
- Full name: Johannes Bernhard Holleman
- Date of birth: 25 December 1918
- Place of birth: The Hague, Netherlands
- Date of death: 5 August 1996 (aged 77)
- Position: Winger

Senior career*
Years	Team	Apps	(Gls)
1944–1953	VUC		

International career
1946	Netherlands	3	(0)
- * Club domestic league appearances and goals

Jan Holleman (25 December 1918 – 5 August 1996) was a Dutch footballer. He played in three matches for the Netherlands national football team in 1946.

Holleman played as a right winger for hometown club VUC during and after World War II.
