= Alan Osborne (footballer, born 1933) =

Australian rules footballer (1933–1996)

Personal information
- Full name: Alan Geoffrey Osborne
- Born: 27 December 1933
- Died: 4 August 1996 (aged 62)
- Original team: Seymour
- Height: 175 cm (5 ft 9 in)
- Weight: 73 kg (161 lb)

Playing career^{1}
Years	Club	Games (Goals)
1955	St Kilda	1 (0)
- ^{1} Playing statistics correct to the end of 1955.

Alan Geoffrey Osborne (27 December 1933 – 4 August 1996) was an Australian rules footballer who played for the St Kilda Football Club in the Victorian Football League (VFL).
