= Observer's paradox =

Phenomenon influenced by observer's presence

In the social sciences, the observer's paradox is a situation in which the phenomenon being observed is unwittingly influenced by the presence of the observer/investigator.

== In linguistics ==
In the field of sociolinguistics, the term Observer’s Paradox was coined by William Labov, who stated with regard to the term:

The aim of linguistic research in the community must be to find out how people talk when they are not being systematically observed; yet we can only obtain this data by systematic observation.

The term refers to the challenge sociolinguists face while doing fieldwork, where the task of gathering data on natural speech is undermined by the researcher's presence itself. As a field worker attempts to observe the daily vernacular of a speaker in an interview, the speaker, aware that their speech will be used for scholarly research, is likely to adopt a formal register. This produces data that is not representative of the speaker's typical speech, and the paradox lies in the fact that if the researcher was not present, the speaker would use normal vernacular.

== Hawthorne effect ==
This variant of the phenomenon is named for the Hawthorne Works, a factory built by Western Electric, where efficiency engineers in the 1920s and 1930s were trying to determine if improved working conditions such as better lighting improved the performance of production workers. The engineers noted that when they provided better working conditions in the production line, efficiency increased. But when the engineers returned the production line to its original conditions and observed the workers, their efficiency increased again. The engineers determined that it was merely the observation of the factory workers, not the changes in the conditions in production line, that increased the measured efficiency. The term "Hawthorne effect" was coined in 1955 by Henry A. Landsberger. Many researchers believe that the evidence that a Hawthorne effect exists has been exaggerated.

== See also ==
- In photojournalism and documentary photography, the photographer often attempts to avoid photos that appear posed or staged.
- Probe effect
- List of paradoxes
