= Edward Whitfield (cricketer) =

English cricketer (1911–1996)

Edward Walter Whitfield (1911–1996) was an English cricketer active from 1930 to 1946 who played for Surrey in the 1930s and then for Northamptonshire (Northants) in 1946 only.

Whitfield was born in Stockwell, London on 31 May 1911 and died in Brighton on 10 August 1996. Whitfield appeared in 125 first-class matches as a right-handed batsman who bowled right arm medium pace. He scored 3,995 runs with a highest score of 198, one of six centuries, and took 35 wickets with a best performance of four for 63.
