= Cisówek, Augustów County =

Cisówek
- Village
- Location within Poland
- Coordinates: 53°57′59″N 22°54′41″E
- Country: Poland
- Voivodeship: Podlaskie
- County: Augustów
- Gmina: Nowinka

Cisówek [t͡ɕiˈsuvɛk] is a village in the administrative district of Gmina Nowinka, within Augustów County, Podlaskie Voivodeship, in north-eastern Poland.
