= Płociczno-Tartak =

Village in Gmina Suwałki, Poland

- Village
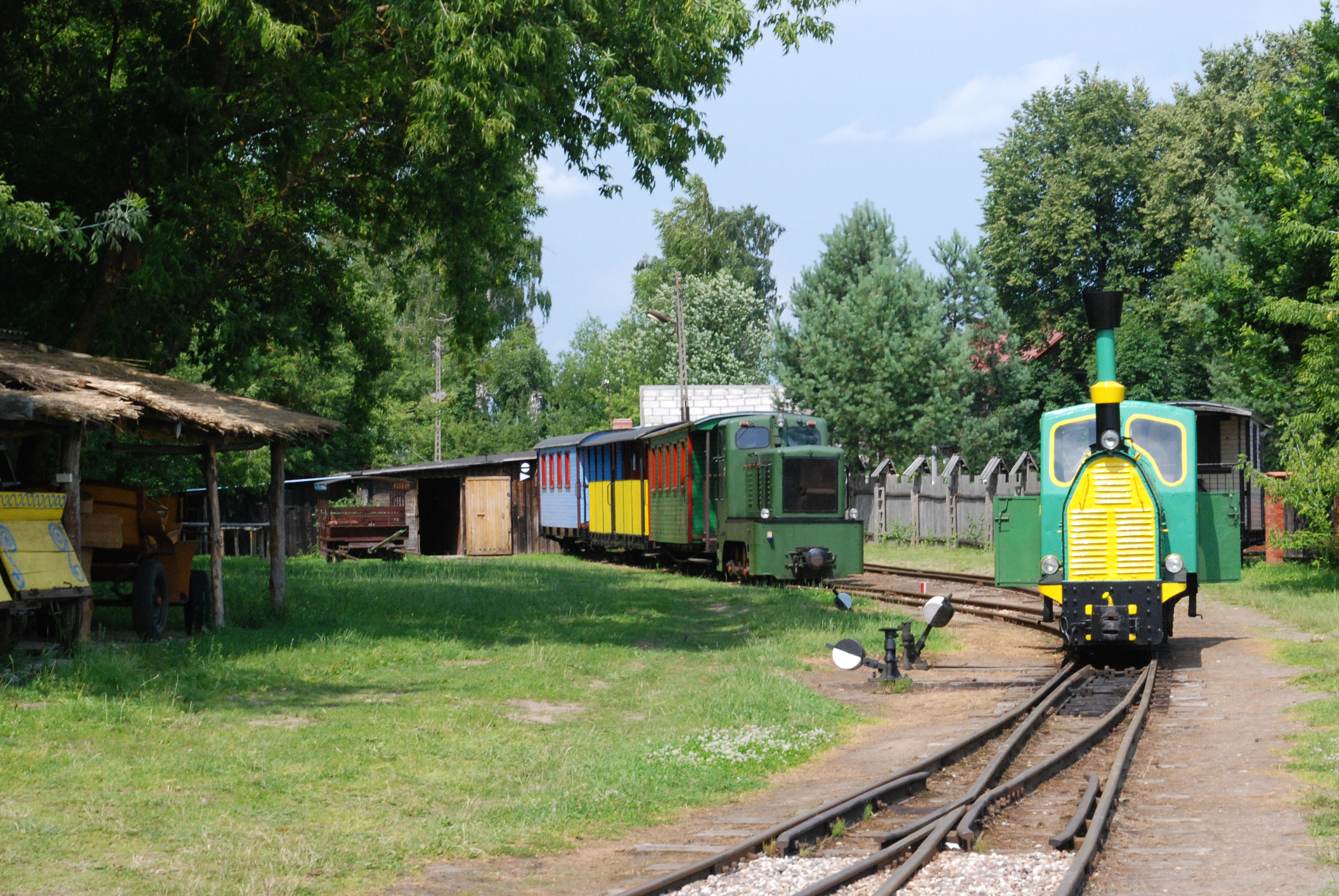
- Museum of narrow gauge railways

- Location within Poland
- Coordinates: 54°01′12″N 22°59′08″E
- Country: Poland
- Voivodeship: Podlaskie
- County: Suwałki
- Gmina: Suwałki

Płociczno-Tartak [pwɔˈt͡ɕit͡ʂnɔ ˈtartak] is a village in the administrative district of Gmina Suwałki, within Suwałki County, Podlaskie Voivodeship, in north-eastern Poland.
