= Fandango (Herb Alpert album) =

Studio album by Herb Alpert
- Released: May 1982
- Studio: CBS Recording Studios, (Mexico City, Mexico); A&M Studios (Hollywood, California); Studio Sound Recorders (North Hollywood, California).
- Genre: Easy listening, pop jazz
- Length: 43:20
- Label: A&M
- Producer: Herb Alpert, José Quintana

Herb Alpert chronology
Magic Man (1981)	Fandango (1982)	Blow Your Own Horn (1983)

Fandango is a studio album by American musician Herb Alpert released on A&M Records in April 1982 with catalog number SP-3731.

One of Alpert's most popular albums, the title tune was composed by Juan Carlos Calderón. It was briefly available on CD in the early '90s, but went out of print. In 2012, a remastered version was released on CD by Shout Factory, and is also available as a download.

== Background and recording ==
Released 20 years after the Latin-inspired "The Lonely Bull", this album marks a return to a Hispanic sound. Alpert had wanted to do something to commemorate the 20th anniversary of his first hit, so he traveled to Mexico and made a recording intended solely for the Latin-American market. However, his interest was kindled by the diversity and quality of the local musicians, and he decided to record an entire album there. Additionally, research revealed that his hit "Rise" had not made an impact on his Tijuana Brass fanbase, and he wanted an album that bridged the gap between his more contemporary sound and his previous mariachi-influenced style.

Stan Freberg directed a promo for the album, satirizing TV commercials in general, but especially Ella Fitzgerald's famous spots for Memorex recording tape. In the original Memorex commercials, Fitzgerald's recorded voice shatters a drinking glass; in the Fandango spot, the sound of Alpert's trumpet smashes a giant taco hanging from the ceiling.

== Reception and impact ==
Professional ratings
Review scores
Source	Rating
AllMusic	3.5/5 stars
The Encyclopedia of Popular Music	2/5 stars

Upon release, the album was favorably reviewed by Billboard as a "Top Album Pick". It entered the Billboard 200 on May 29, 1982, to begin a chart stay of 26 weeks, peaking at number 100. In addition, the album peaked at #20 on Jazz Albums, and #52 on R&B Albums. Richard S. Ginell at AllMusic gave the album a highly positive review, calling it "a masterpiece" and some tracks "spine-chilling". He further stated the material in Fandango surpassed that of the earlier Tijuana Brass output. Stereo Review was much less enthusiastic, stating that there was "nothing new or different" in the album. Alpert found his Mexican recording experience so positive that he decided to form a sub-label for the Latin market, both in the U.S. and abroad, under the direction of José Quintana.

The album's only single to hit the top 40 was "Route 101" which peaked at number 37 on the Billboard Hot 100 the weeks of August 14 and 21, 1982. As of 2022, it is Alpert's last instrumental single to surpass that level.

== Track listing ==
No.	Title	Writer(s)	Length
1.	"Fandango"	Juan Carlos Calderón	3:41
2.	"Margarita"	Juan Carlos Calderón	3:41
3.	"Push and Pull"	Juan Carlos Calderón	4:40
4.	"California Blues"	Juan Carlos Calderón	3:49
5.	"Quiereme Tal Como Soy"	Rafael Perez-Botija	3:49
6.	"Route 101"	Juan Carlos Calderón	3:21
7.	"Coco Loco"	Diego Verdaguer	2:54
8.	"Aria"	Eduardo Magallanes	3:44
9.	"Angel"	Juan Carlos Calderón	2:51
10.	"Sugarloaf"	Erasmo Carlos, Roberto Carlos	5:07
11.	"Latin Medley (Frenesi / Bahia / Moliendo Cafe / Porompompero)"	Dominguez, Barroso, Manzu, Ochiata	5:43
Total length:			43:20

== Personnel ==
- Herb Alpert – all trumpets, vocoder (4), lead vocals (5), backing vocals (6), arrangements (10)
- Michel Colombier – keyboards (1, 3, 5, 6, 8, 10, 11), synthesizers (1, 3, 5, 10), arrangements (3, 5)
- Bill Cuomo – synthesizers (1, 2, 4, 7–9), keyboards (2, 4, 7, 9), arrangements (2, 7)
- Juan Carlos Calderón – arrangements (1, 6, 9, 11), keyboards (11)
- Eduardo Magallanes – arrangements (4, 8), keyboards (8)
- Greg Mathieson – synthesizers (6, 10), keyboards (10)
- Abraham Laboriel – guitars (1, 3, 5, 6, 10, 11), bass (1, 9–11)
- Miguel Peña – guitars (2, 4, 7, 8)
- Tim May – guitars (3, 5, 6, 11)
- Carlos Rios – guitars (3, 6, 9, 11)
- Bernardino Santiago Gonzales – guitars (8)
- Victor Ruiz Pazos – bass (2, 4, 7, 8)
- Freddie Washington – bass (3, 5, 6)
- Carlos Vega – drums (1–9, 11)
- Ralph Humphrey – drums (10)
- Paulinho da Costa – percussion (1–3, 5–7, 9, 11)
- Julius Wechter – marimba (3, 11)
- Laudir de Oliveira – percussion (10)
- Gayle Levant – harp (3, 5, 8)
- Guillermo Espinosa – horns (8)
- Carlos Macias – horns (8)
- Gary Gertzweig's String Section – strings
- Rafael Pérez-Botija – arrangements (5)
- José Quintana – backing vocals (2), arrangements (10)
- Marie Cain – backing vocals (6, 11)
- Mary Hylan – backing vocals (6, 11)
- Darlene Koldenhoven – backing vocals (6, 11)

=== Production ===
- Herb Alpert – producer
- José Quintana – producer
- Howard Lee Wolen – engineer
- Benny Faccone – assistant engineer
- Don Hahn – additional engineer
- John Beverly Jones – additional engineer
- Steve Katz – additional engineer
- Bryan Stott – additional engineer, remixing
- Bernie Grundman – mastering
- Jeffrey Kent Ayeroff – art direction
- Chuck Beeson – art direction
- Elizabeth Paul – cover design
- Richard Avedon – photography
