= Jinx (author) =

American actress and author

Gigi McQueen / Jinx
- Born: Gabriel McClure; October 6, 1994 (age 32); Goshen, Indiana, United States
- Education: Mira Costa High School
- Occupation: Actress author
- Writing career
- Genres: Comedy horror, young adult fiction, new adult fiction
- Website: www.jeepersgigi.com

Gabriel McClure (born October 6, 1994), known professionally as Gigi McQueen and Jinx, is an American actress and author. She is known for writing the Get Spooky series, Mr. Macabre Presents, and Vicious Vile Venom, which was a 2016 Watty award recipient in the new voices category.

In June 2019, she joined Wattpad's Stars program.

Jinx was born in Goshen, Indiana, but brought up in both Winona Lake, Indiana and Southern California. She cites her writing influences as Chuck Palahniuk, Janet Evanovich, David Sedaris, and Spencer Hoshino. Her short stories "Moving Up" and "Moving Down" were published under the pseudonym Gabe McClure in NaNoWriMo anthologies Believe Me Not: An Unreliable Anthology and It's About Time: 2nd Annual NanNo Los Angeles Short Story Anthology. In December 2018, the first three books in the Get Spooky series hit Amazon's Top 100 Best Sellers list.

== Bibliography ==
=== The Get Spooky Series ===
- Spook (Originally released October 6, 2016, second edition released February 14, 2017)
- Ho Ho No (Originally published December 2016, out of print)
- Dearly Departed (February 19, 2017)
- Haunt (August 23, 2018)
- Dearly Deadly (TBR)

=== Other books ===
- Vicious Vile Venom (2016 Watty Award Winner, "New Voices")
- Mr. Macabre Presents (2018 Watty Award Shortlister)
- The Everyday Lives of People Who Do Very Bad Things
- Untitled Peter Pan Retelling

== Acting ==
In addition to writing, Jinx also has performed as an actress. While performing in a production of Annie, she received one-on-one advice from Carol Burnett herself. She appeared in the first-ever stage production of Disney's Hercules as Hades.

=== Short stories ===
- "Moving Up", published under Gabe McClure in Believe Me Not: An Unreliable Anthology (released October 11, 2014)
- "Moving Down", published under Gabe McClure in It's About Time: 2nd Annual NaNo Los Angeles Short Story Anthology (released November 15, 2015)
- Me vs The Mile (Winner of Amy Poehler's Yes Moment Contest)
