= Bryzgiel =

- Village
- Location within Poland
- Coordinates: 54°0′N 23°5′E
- Country: Poland
- Voivodeship: Podlaskie
- County: Augustów
- Gmina: Nowinka

Bryzgiel [ˈbrɨzɡʲɛl] is a village in the administrative district of Gmina Nowinka, within Augustów County, Podlaskie Voivodeship, in north-eastern Poland.
