= Monkinie =

- Village
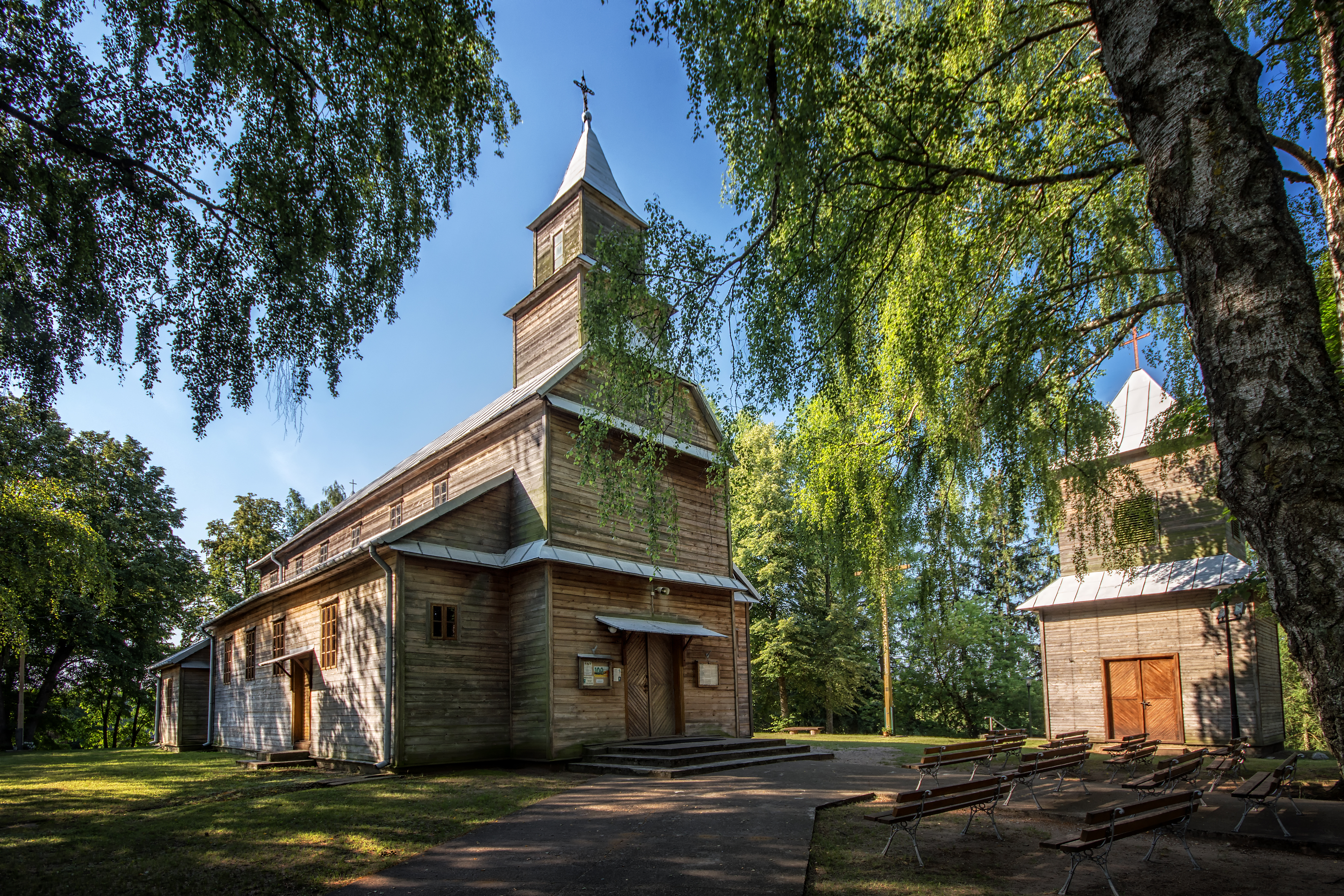
- Our Lady of the Angels church in Monkinie

- Location within Poland
- Coordinates: 53°58′55″N 23°5′20″E
- Country: Poland
- Voivodeship: Podlaskie
- County: Augustów
- Gmina: Nowinka
- Time zone: UTC+1 (CET)
  - Summer (DST): UTC+2 (CEST)
- Vehicle registration: BAU

Monkinie [mɔŋˈkiɲɛ], (Lithuanian: Mankynė), is a village in the administrative district of Gmina Nowinka, within Augustów County, Podlaskie Voivodeship, in north-eastern Poland.

During the German occupation of Poland (World War II), the Germans arrested multiple members of the local Polish resistance movement, including local parish priest Bolesław Cieciuchowski, and then murdered 12 resistance members near Suwałki on September 29, 1943 (see Nazi crimes against the Polish nation). The priest was then buried by his brother and local parishioners in Monkinie.
