= Blizna, Podlaskie Voivodeship =

Blizna
- Village
- Location within Poland
- Coordinates: 53°54′10″N 23°0′53″E
- Country: Poland
- Voivodeship: Podlaskie
- County: Augustów
- Gmina: Nowinka

Blizna [ˈblizna] is a village in the administrative district of Gmina Nowinka, within Augustów County, Podlaskie Voivodeship, in north-eastern Poland.

Blizna settlement is located at the edge of a forest complex along the small Blizna road with a train stop nearby; a short train-ride north-east from Augustów. The distance to the nearest, smaller lake called Długie Augustowskie is 1 km (0.6 mi), south.
