= Witold Urbanowicz =

Polish flying ace and general (1908–1996)

- Witold Urbanowicz
- Born: Witold Aleksander Urbanowicz; 30 March 1908; Olszanka, Augustów County, Poland, Russian Empire
- Died: 17 August 1996 (aged 88); New York City, New York, U.S.
- Military career
- Allegiance: Poland
- Branch: Polish Air Force; Royal Air Force; United States Army Air Forces
- Service years: 1930–1946
- Rank: Air Vice Marshal
- Service number: 781951
- Conflicts: World War II: Invasion of Poland; Battle of Britain; Chinese theater
- Awards: Virtuti Militari; Cross of Valour; Distinguished Flying Cross; Air Medal (United States); Flying Cross (China)
- Other work: Commercial pilot (1946–1973)

Witold Urbanowicz (30 March 1908 – 17 August 1996) was a Polish fighter ace of the Second World War. According to the official record, Witold Urbanowicz was the second highest-scoring Polish fighter ace, with 17 confirmed wartime kills and 1 probable, not counting his pre-war victory. He was awarded with several decorations, among others the Virtuti Militari and British Distinguished Flying Cross. He also published several books of memoirs.

== Biography ==
Urbanowicz was born in Olszanka, Augustów County. In 1930 he entered the Szkoła Podchorążych Lotnictwa cadet flying school in Dęblin, graduating in 1932 as a 2/Lt. Observer. He was then posted to the night bomber squadron of the 1st Air Regiment in Warsaw. Later he completed an advanced pilotage course to become a fighter pilot. In the 1930s he flew with the 113th and the No. 111th "Kościuszko" Squadron.

In August 1936, flying a PZL P.11a, he shot down a Soviet reconnaissance plane which had crossed into Polish airspace. He was officially reprimanded and unofficially congratulated by his superior officer and as "punishment" in October 1936 he was transferred to an air force training school in Dęblin where he was nicknamed "Cobra".

=== Second World War ===
During the Invasion of Poland in 1939, Urbanowicz was in an improvised Ułęż Group, composed of flying instructors, flying obsolete PZL P.7a fighters and covering the Dęblin and Ułęż airfields. Despite a few encounters with enemy airplanes the Polish fighters (which could barely match the speed of German bombers) were not able to shoot down any enemy planes. On 8 September the school was evacuated from Ułęż and Dęblin.

He was ordered with the cadets to Romania, where they were told to await re-equipment: British and French aircraft were rumoured to have been sent, but no aircraft arrived. Urbanowicz returned to Poland to continue to fight, but after the Soviet invasion of Poland, he was captured by a Soviet irregular unit. The same day he managed to escape with two cadets and crossed the Romanian border and eventually found his way to France where, after the fall of Poland, a new Polish army was being formed.

While in France he and a group of other Polish pilots were invited to join the Royal Air Force in Great Britain. After initial training with 1 School of Army Co-operation at Old Sarum, he was sent to 6 OTU for re-training on fighters in July 1940. In August he was assigned to No. 145 Squadron RAF, and became operational on 4 August 1940. On 8 August he shot down a Messerschmitt Bf 110 flown by Major Joachim Schlichting of V./LG 1 while flying with No. 601 Squadron (although he was never officially attached to the unit) and on 12 August a Junkers Ju 88 of KG 51.

On 21 August he was transferred to the Polish-manned No. 303 Squadron, flying a Hawker Hurricane as "A" Flight commander. On 6 September he shot down a Bf 109 of JG 52. On 7 September he became Squadron Leader, after Zdzisław Krasnodębski was badly burned. On 15 September Urbanowicz claimed two Dornier Do. 17's of KG 2.

On 18 September 1940 Urbanowicz was awarded the Silver Cross of the Virtuti Militari by the Commander-in-Chief of the Polish Forces, General Sikorski. On 24 October, he was awarded the Distinguished Flying Cross.

On 27 September he was officially credited with shooting down four aircraft: two Ju 88s of KG 77, a Bf 109 and a Bf 110 of 15.LG 1. On 30 September he claimed three Bf 109s (one from stab. JG 26, one of II./JG 53 and one of 4.JG 54) and one Dornier Do 17 of KG 3. Despite his success Urbanowicz was never popular at the Polish headquarters and on 21 October he was forced to hand over command of the Squadron to Zdzisław Henneberg.

During the Battle of Britain, he claimed 15 confirmed kills and 1 probable, which made him one of the top Polish aces (second only to Stanisław Skalski) and among the top ten Allied aces of the battle.

Between 15 April 1941 and 1 June 1941 he commanded the 1st Polish Fighter Wing based at RAF Northolt, before being posted to staff work at No. 11 Group RAF HQ. In June 1941 he was assigned as the 2nd Air Attaché in the Polish Embassy in the United States.

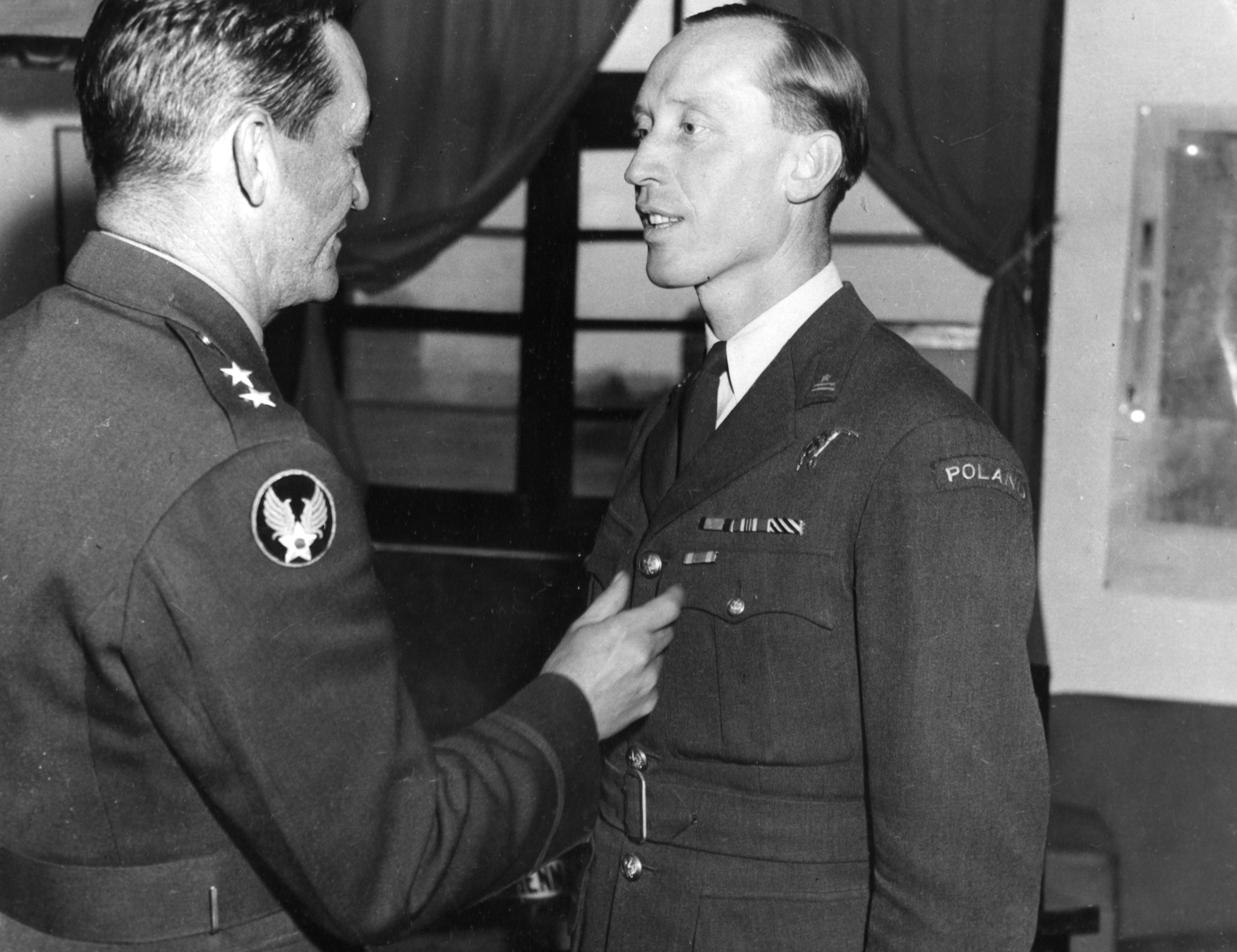
Urbanowicz receiving medal from USAAF's Gen. Chennault. January 11, 1944

In September 1943 Urbanowicz joined the USAAF 14th Air Force on attachment in China. On 23 October he joined the 75th Fighter Squadron of the 23rd Fighter Group ("Flying Tigers"). Flying a P-40 Warhawk he took part in several combat missions. On 11 December he fought against six Japanese Mitsubishi Zeros and claimed two shot down (these were actually Nakajima Ki-44 "Tojo" fighters of the 85th Sentai).

According to his reports he also shot other airplanes over China, and destroyed some on the ground, but those victories were not officially confirmed. According to Kenneth K. Koskodian, he downed 11 Japanese aircraft while being Claire Lee Chennault's guest. He was later awarded the US Air Medal and a Chinese Flying Cross.

In December 1943 he returned to the United Kingdom and later became an Air Attaché in the USA again.

=== After the war ===
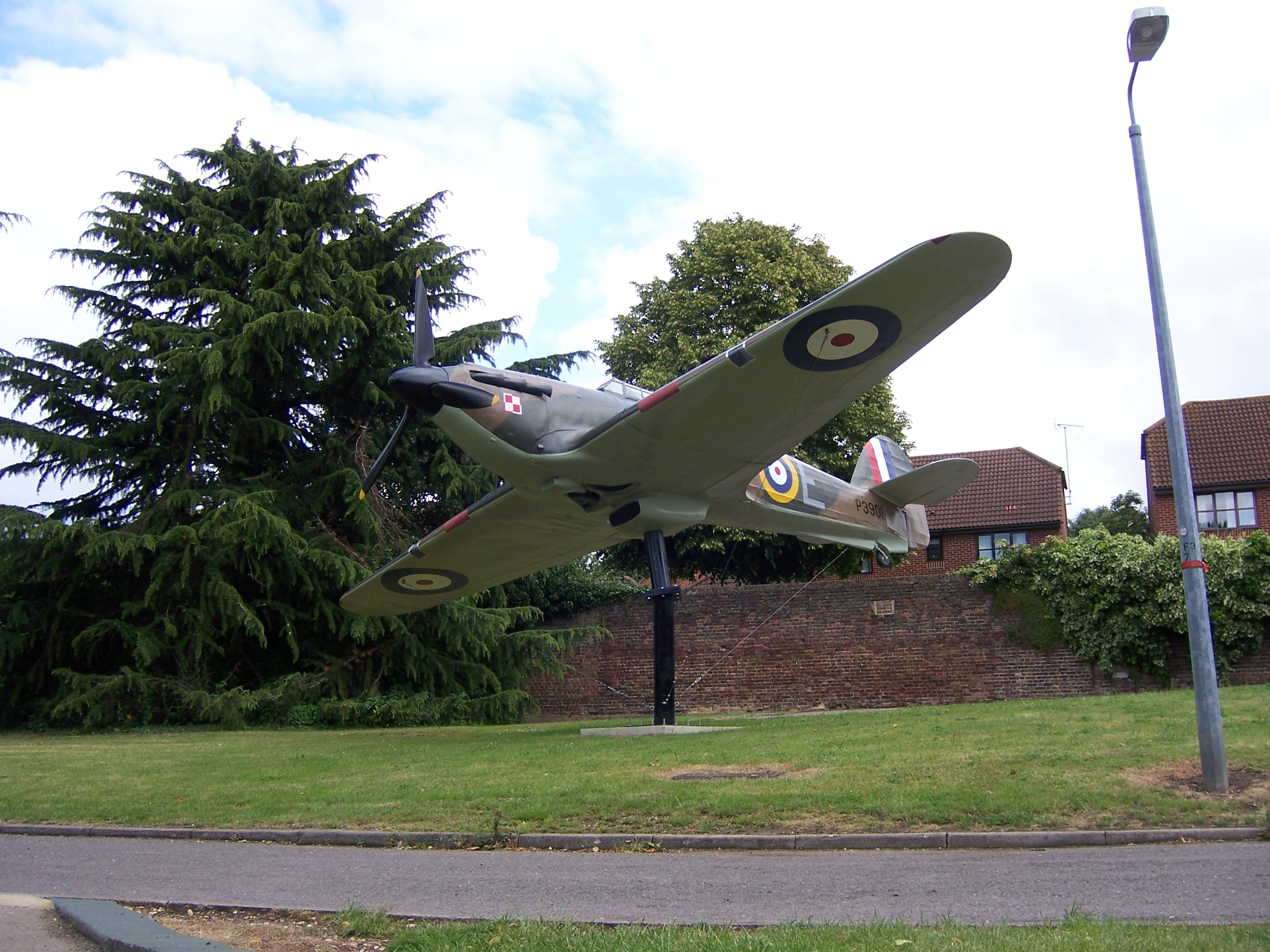
Hurricane gate guardian at RAF Uxbridge in the colours of Witold Urbanowicz's 303 Squadron aircraft

In 1946, he returned to Poland, but was arrested four times by the communist Służba Bezpieczeństwa secret police as a suspected spy. After his release, he fled to the USA. He lived in New York City working for American Airlines, Eastern Airlines and Republic Aviation, retiring in 1973. In 1991 he visited Poland after the fall of communism and again in 1995 when he was promoted to the rank of General. He died in New York on 17 August 1996.

A fibreglass Hawker Hurricane gate guardian was unveiled at RAF Uxbridge in September 2010 in the colours of Urbanowicz's aircraft from the Battle of Britain.

== Awards ==
Virtuti Militari, Silver Cross (18 September 1940)
Cross of Valour, four times
Distinguished Flying Cross (United Kingdom)
Air Medal (United States)
Star Medal with Two Stars (Republic of China)

== In popular culture ==
Witold Urbanowicz was portrayed by Marcin Dorociński in the 2018 film Hurricane: 303 Squadron.
