= Ateny, Podlaskie Voivodeship =

Ateny
- Village
- Location within Poland
- Coordinates: 53°57′N 23°2′E
- Country: Poland
- Voivodeship: Podlaskie
- County: Augustów
- Gmina: Nowinka
- Population: 40

Ateny [aˈtɛnɨ] is a village in the administrative district of Gmina Nowinka, within Augustów County, Podlaskie Voivodeship, in north-eastern Poland.
