= Kopanica, Gmina Nowinka =

Kopanica
- Village
- Location within Poland
- Coordinates: 53°57′22″N 23°7′47″E
- Country: Poland
- Voivodeship: Podlaskie
- County: Augustów
- Gmina: Nowinka

Kopanica [kɔpaˈnit͡sa] is a village in the administrative district of Gmina Nowinka, in Augustów County, Podlaskie Voivodeship, in northeastern Poland.
