= Jinx (video game) =

2003 video game

- Developer: HammerHead
- Publisher: Sony Computer Entertainment
- Directors: Paul Hunter; Andy Ingram
- Designers: Raoul Barnett; Jason Allen
- Programmers: Paul Elliott; Kieren Gracie
- Artists: Leigh Hammond; Noel Hammond; Steve Ackah
- Composer: Game Audio Ltd.
- Platform: PlayStation
- Release: EU: 31 January 2003
- Genre: Platform
- Mode: Single-player

Jinx is a 2003 platform video game developed by HammerHead and published by Sony Computer Entertainment for the PlayStation. It is the final video game to be published by Sony for the PlayStation that is not a sports video game, three years after the launch of the PlayStation 2.

== Gameplay ==
The game consists of six different themed realms, each of which has three levels. Before reaching the final level of the game, players will travel through the candy-colored castle of Mamoo City, the waterlogged rainforests of Zonimama, the sand dunes and mock-Egyptian architecture of Pyramidicia, the underwater realm of Aquaquatica, the garish Spookyland, and the pirates' hometown of Buccaneria--all of which will be inhabited by different enemies.

== Plot ==
The titular character in the game is a failed magician who, as the son of an incredibly powerful wizard, has somewhat embarrassingly ended up working as a court jester for King Mamooset XIV. The plot of the game sees Jinx awakening one morning to find that his world has quite literally gone mad. A group of pirates led by the evil Captain Gripply has attacked the world of Ploog using a magical spell that's turned the inhabitants of Jinx's world against one another.

== Development ==
The game was announced in 2002.

== Reception ==
Reception

Review score
Publication	Score
Eurogamer	4/10

Eurogamer rated the game a 4 of 10 stating "Overall, you'll play worse games than Jinx - it does what it sets out to do; i.e. be a safe, neat, no frills platformer, that is suitable for children. But then there are dozens of better games in the genre on the PSone, and most of them will be available at a fraction of the price. Avoid."
