= Lloyd Robinson (cricketer) =

Welsh cricketer (1912–1996)

Personal information
- Full name: Thomas Lloyd Robinson
- Born: 12 December 1912; Swansea, Glamorgan, Wales
- Died: 2 August 1996 (aged 83); Westminster, London, England
- Batting: Right-handed
- Bowling: Right-arm medium-fast

Domestic team information
- Years: Team
- 1946: Warwickshire

Career statistics
Competition	First-class
Matches	4
Runs scored	27
Batting average	4.50
100s/50s	–/–
Top score	12*
Balls bowled	552
Wickets	6
Bowling average	46.16
5 wickets in innings	–
10 wickets in match	–
Best bowling	2/74
Catches/stumpings	–/–
- Source: Cricinfo, 25 October 2015

Thomas Lloyd Robinson (21 December 1912 – 2 August 1996) was a Welsh cricketer active in first-class cricket in 1946, making four appearances as a bowler.

Robinson made his debut in first-class cricket when he was selected to play for Warwickshire in the County Championship against Derbyshire at Edgbaston. He made three further appearances for Warwickshire in 1946, playing twice more in the County Championship, and in a tour match against the Indians. He scored a total of 27 runs in his four matches, with a high score of 13 not out. With the ball in hand he took 6 wickets, averaging 46.16, with best figures of 2/74.

Robinson was a successful businessman and was the chairman of the Dickinson Robinson Group from 1974–1977. He died at Westminster, London on 2 August 1996.
