= Frans Reyniers =

Belgian footballer

Personal information
- Date of birth: 27 June 1928
- Date of death: 17 August 1996 (aged 68)

International career
Years	Team	Apps	(Gls)
1952	Belgium	2	(0)

Frans Reyniers (27 June 1928 – 17 August 1996) was a Belgian footballer. He played in two matches for the Belgium national football team in 1952.
