= Ern O'Regan =

Australian rules footballer

Personal information
- Full name: Ernst William Gilbert O'Regan
- Born: 23 January 1907; South Australia
- Died: 22 August 1996 (aged 89)
- Original team: Port Adelaide
- Height: 183 cm (6 ft 0 in)
- Weight: 71 kg (157 lb)

Playing career^{1}
Years	Club	Games (Goals)
1929–1930	Port Adelaide	34
1931	Carlton	1 (0)
- ^{1} Playing statistics correct to the end of 1931.

Ernst William Gilbert O'Regan (23 January 1907 – 22 August 1996) was an Australian rules footballer who played with Carlton in the Victorian Football League (VFL).
