= Don McVilly =

Australian rules footballer

Personal information
- Full name: Donald Clarence McVilly
- Born: 7 August 1920; Hobert, Tasmania
- Died: 17 August 1996 (aged 76); Cremorne, Tasmania
- Original team: New Town
- Height: 174 cm (5 ft 9 in)
- Weight: 76 kg (168 lb)

Playing career^{1}
Years	Club	Games (Goals)
1945–47	Hawthorn	42 (20)
- ^{1} Playing statistics correct to the end of 1947.

Donald Clarence McVilly (7 August 1920 – 17 August 1996) was an Australian rules footballer who played with Hawthorn in the Victorian Football League (VFL).

Prior to playing with Hawthorn, McVilly briefly served in the Merchant Navy during World War II.
