= Fred Jinks (cricketer) =

Australian cricketer

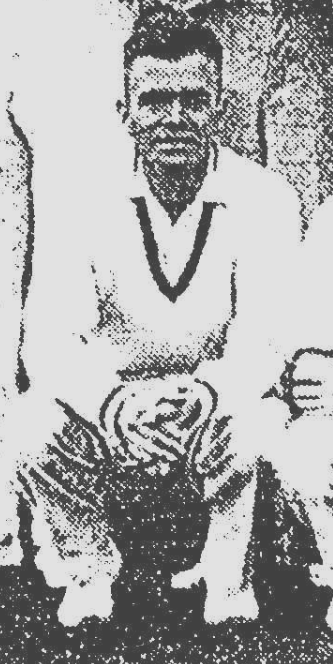

Personal information
- Born: 6 May 1909; Melbourne, Australia
- Died: 16 August 1996 (aged 87); Melbourne, Australia

Domestic team information
- Years: Team
- 1931: Victoria
- Source: Cricinfo, 22 November 2015

Fred Jinks (6 May 1909 – 16 August 1996) was an Australian cricketer. He played one first-class cricket match for Victoria in 1931.

== See also ==
- List of Victoria first-class cricketers
