= Fandango on core =

Out-of-bounds pointer effects

Fandango on core is a computer programming term for the effects of a pointer running out of bounds, often leading to a core dump, or failures in other seemingly unrelated processes. In extreme situations, fandango on core may lead to the overwriting of operating system code, possibly causing data loss or system crashes. The advent of protected memory means that while a program cannot overwrite the memory of other programs, a loose pointer can still cause strange behaviour within the application.

The term presumably comes from the programmer imagining the program following the wild pointer and dancing a fandango on the core (an older term for memory) of a program.
