= Subject-expectancy effect =

Behavioural effect

In scientific research and psychotherapy, the subject-expectancy effect, is a form of reactivity that occurs when a research subject expects a given result and therefore unconsciously affects the outcome, or reports the expected result. Because this effect can significantly bias the results of experiments (especially on human subjects), double-blind methodology is used to eliminate the effect.

Like the observer-expectancy effect, it is often a cause of "odd" results in many experiments. The subject-expectancy effect is most commonly found in medicine, where it can result in the subject experiencing the placebo effect or nocebo effect, depending on how the influence pans out.

== Example ==
An example of a scenario involving these various effects is as follows: A woman goes to her doctor with a problem. The doctor diagnoses with certainty, and then clearly explains the diagnosis and the expected route towards recovery. If he does this convincingly, calming her, removing fear and instilling hope, she will likely, through the positive expectancy, experience the placebo effect, aiding in her recovery.

On the other hand, if her doctor had had little time for her, was uncertain about the diagnosis, and had given her a prescription, combined with a message along the lines of, "this may help sometimes", and added a message about possible horrible side effects (combined, say, with the patient having talked to a neighbor who also speaks along the same lines about the horrible side effects), then the chance of negative subject-expectancy, or nocebo, becomes quite large.

== See also ==
- Hawthorne effect
- Pygmalion effect
- Amplified placebo effect
- Inverse placebo effect
- Lessebo effect

== Bibliography ==
- Gomm, Roger (2009). "Subject reactivity". Key Concepts in Social Research Methods. Palgrave Macmillan. ISBN 9781137175175.
