= Nocebo =

Harmful effect from negative belief

A nocebo effect is said to occur when a patient's expectations for a treatment cause the treatment to have a worse effect than it otherwise would have. For example, when a patient anticipates a side effect of a medication, they can experience that effect even if the "medication" is actually an inert substance. The complementary concept, the placebo effect, is said to occur when expectations improve an outcome.

More generally, the nocebo effect is falling ill simply by consciously or subconsciously anticipating a harmful event. This definition includes anticipated events other than medical treatment. It has been applied to Havana syndrome, where purported victims were anticipating attacks by foreign adversaries. This definition also applies to cases of electromagnetic hypersensitivity.

Both placebo and nocebo effects are presumably psychogenic but can induce measurable changes in the body. One article that reviewed 31 studies on nocebo effects reported a wide range of symptoms that could manifest as nocebo effects, including nausea, stomach pains, itching, bloating, depression, sleep problems, loss of appetite, sexual dysfunction, and severe hypotension.

== Etymology and usage ==
Walter Kennedy coined the term nocebo (Latin nocēbō, "I shall harm", from noceō, "I harm") in 1961 to denote the counterpart of placebo (Latin placēbō, "I shall please", from placeō, "I please"), a substance that may produce a beneficial, healthful, pleasant, or desirable effect. Kennedy emphasized that his use of the term nocebo refers strictly to a subject-centered response, a quality "inherent in the patient rather than in the remedy". That is, he rejected the use of the term for pharmacologically induced negative side effects such as the ringing in the ears caused by quinine. That is not to say that the patient's psychologically induced response may not include physiological effects. For example, an expectation of pain may induce anxiety, which in turn causes the release of cholecystokinin, which facilitates pain transmission.

== Response ==
In the narrowest sense, a nocebo response occurs when a drug-trial subject's symptoms are worsened by the administration of an inert, sham, or dummy (simulator) treatment, called a placebo. Placebos contain no chemicals (or any other agents) that could cause any of the observed worsening in the subject's symptoms, so any change for the worse must be due to some subjective factor. Adverse expectations can also cause anesthetic medications' analgesic effects to disappear.

The worsening of the subject's symptoms or reduction of beneficial effects is a direct consequence of their exposure to the placebo, but the placebo has not chemically generated those symptoms. Because this generation of symptoms entails a complex of "subject-internal" activities, we can never speak in the strictest sense in terms of simulator-centered "nocebo effects", but only in terms of subject-centered "nocebo responses". Some observers attribute nocebo responses (or placebo responses) to a subject's gullibility, but there is no evidence that someone who manifests a nocebo/placebo response to one treatment will manifest a nocebo/placebo response to any other treatment; i.e., there is no fixed nocebo/placebo-responding trait or propensity.

Based on a biosemiotic model (2022), Goli explains how harm and/or healing expectations lead to a multimodal image and form transient allostatic or homeostatic interoceptive feelings, demonstrating how repetitive experiences of a potential body induce epigenetic changes and form new attractors, such as nocebos and placeboes, in the actual body.

== Effects ==
=== Side effects of drugs ===
It has been shown that, due to the nocebo effect, warning patients about drugs' side effects can contribute to the causation of such effects, whether the drug is real or not. This effect has been observed in clinical trials: according to a 2013 review, the dropout rate among placebo-treated patients in a meta-analysis of 41 clinical trials of Parkinson's disease treatments was 8.8%. A 2013 review found that nearly 1 out of 20 patients receiving a placebo in clinical trials for depression dropped out due to adverse events, which were believed to have been caused by the nocebo effect.

In January 2022, a systematic review and meta-analysis concluded that nocebo responses accounted for 72% of adverse effects after the first COVID-19 vaccine dose and 52% after the second dose.

Many studies show that the formation of nocebo responses are influenced by inappropriate health education, media work, and other discourse makers who induce health anxiety and negative expectations.

Researchers studying the side effects of statins in UK determined that a large proportion of reported side effects were related not to any pharmacological cause but to the nocebo effect. In the UK, publicity in 2013 about the apparent side effects caused hundreds of thousands of patients to stop taking statins, leading to an estimated 2,000 additional cardiovascular events in the subsequent years.

=== Electromagnetic hypersensitivity ===
Evidence suggests that the symptoms of electromagnetic hypersensitivity are caused by the nocebo effect.

=== Pain ===
Verbal suggestion can cause hyperalgesia (increased sensitivity to pain) and allodynia (perception of a tactile stimulus as painful) as a result of the nocebo effect. Nocebo hyperalgesia is believed to involve the activation of cholecystokinin receptors.

=== Cognitive performance ===
Nocebo effects on cognitive performance have been reported, most consistently for episodic memory, with more mixed findings for other domains; overall, this remains a comparatively underexplored area of nocebo research.

== Ambiguity of medical usage ==
Stewart-Williams and Podd argue that using the contrasting terms "placebo" and "nocebo" for inert agents that produce pleasant, health-improving, or desirable outcomes and unpleasant, health-diminishing, or undesirable outcomes (respectively) is extremely counterproductive. For example, precisely the same inert agents can produce analgesia and hyperalgesia, the first of which, on this definition, would be a placebo, and the second a nocebo.

A second problem is that the same effect, such as immunosuppression, may be desirable for a subject with an autoimmune disorder, but undesirable for most other subjects. Thus, in the first case, the effect would be a placebo, and in the second a nocebo. A third problem is that the prescriber does not know whether the relevant subjects consider the effects they experience desirable or undesirable until some time after the drugs have been administered. A fourth is that the same phenomena are generated in all the subjects, and generated by the same drug, which is acting in all of the subjects through the same mechanism. Yet because the phenomena in question have been subjectively considered desirable to one group but not the other, the phenomena are now being labeled in two mutually exclusive ways (i.e., placebo and nocebo), giving the false impression that the drug in question has produced two different phenomena.

== Ambiguity of anthropological usage ==
Some people maintain that belief can kill (e.g., voodoo death: Cannon in 1942 describes a number of instances from a variety of different cultures) and or heal (e.g., faith healing). A self-willed death (due to voodoo hex, evil eye, pointing the bone procedure, etc.) is an extreme form of a culture-specific syndrome or mass psychogenic illness that produces a particular form of psychosomatic or psychophysiological disorder resulting in psychogenic death. Rubel in 1964 spoke of "culture-bound" syndromes, those "from which members of a particular group claim to suffer and for which their culture provides an etiology, diagnosis, preventive measures, and regimens of healing".

Certain anthropologists, such as Robert Hahn and Arthur Kleinman, have extended the placebo/nocebo distinction into this realm to allow a distinction to be made between rituals, such as faith healing, performed to heal, cure, or bring benefit (placebo rituals) and others, such as "pointing the bone", performed to kill, injure or bring harm (nocebo rituals). As the meaning of the two interrelated and opposing terms has extended, we now find anthropologists speaking, in various contexts, of nocebo or placebo (harmful or helpful) rituals:

- that might entail nocebo or placebo (unpleasant or pleasant) procedures;
- about which subjects might have nocebo or placebo (harmful or beneficial) beliefs;
- that are delivered by operators that might have nocebo or placebo (pathogenic, disease-generating or salutogenic, health-promoting) expectations;
- that are delivered to subjects that might have nocebo or placebo (negative, fearful, despairing or positive, hopeful, confident) expectations about the ritual;
- that are delivered by operators who might have nocebo or placebo (malevolent or benevolent) intentions, in the hope that the rituals will generate nocebo or placebo (lethal, injurious, harmful or restorative, curative, healthy) outcomes; and, that all of this depends upon the operator's overall beliefs in the nocebo ritual's harmful nature or the placebo ritual's beneficial nature.

Yet it may become even more terminologically complex, for as Hahn and Kleinman indicate, there can also be cases of paradoxical nocebo outcomes from placebo rituals and placebo outcomes from nocebo rituals (see also unintended consequences). In 1973, writing from his extensive experience of treating cancer (including more than 1,000 melanoma cases) at Sydney Hospital, Milton warned of the impact of the delivery of a prognosis, and how many of his patients, upon receiving their prognosis, gave up hope and died a premature death: "there is a small group of patients in whom the realization of impending death is a blow so terrible that they are quite unable to adjust to it, and they die rapidly before the malignancy seems to have developed enough to cause death. This problem of self-willed death is in some ways analogous to the death produced in primitive peoples by witchcraft ('pointing the bone')".

== Ethics ==
Some researchers have pointed out that the harm caused by communicating with patients about potential treatment adverse events raises an ethical issue. To respect their autonomy, one must inform a patient about harms a treatment may cause. Yet the way in which potential harms are communicated could cause additional harm, which may violate the ethical principle of non-maleficence. It is possible that nocebo effects can be reduced while respecting autonomy using different models of informed consent, including the use of a framing effect and the authorized concealment.

== See also ==
- Amplified placebo effect
- Autosuggestion
- Clinical trial
- Inverse placebo effect
- Lessebo effect
- Placebo studies
- Psychosomatic illness
- Scientific control
- Self-fulfilling prophecy
- Subject-expectancy effect
- Suggestibility
- Suggestion
- Therapeutic effect
- Thomas theorem
