= Daniel Amen =

American celebrity doctor (born 1954)

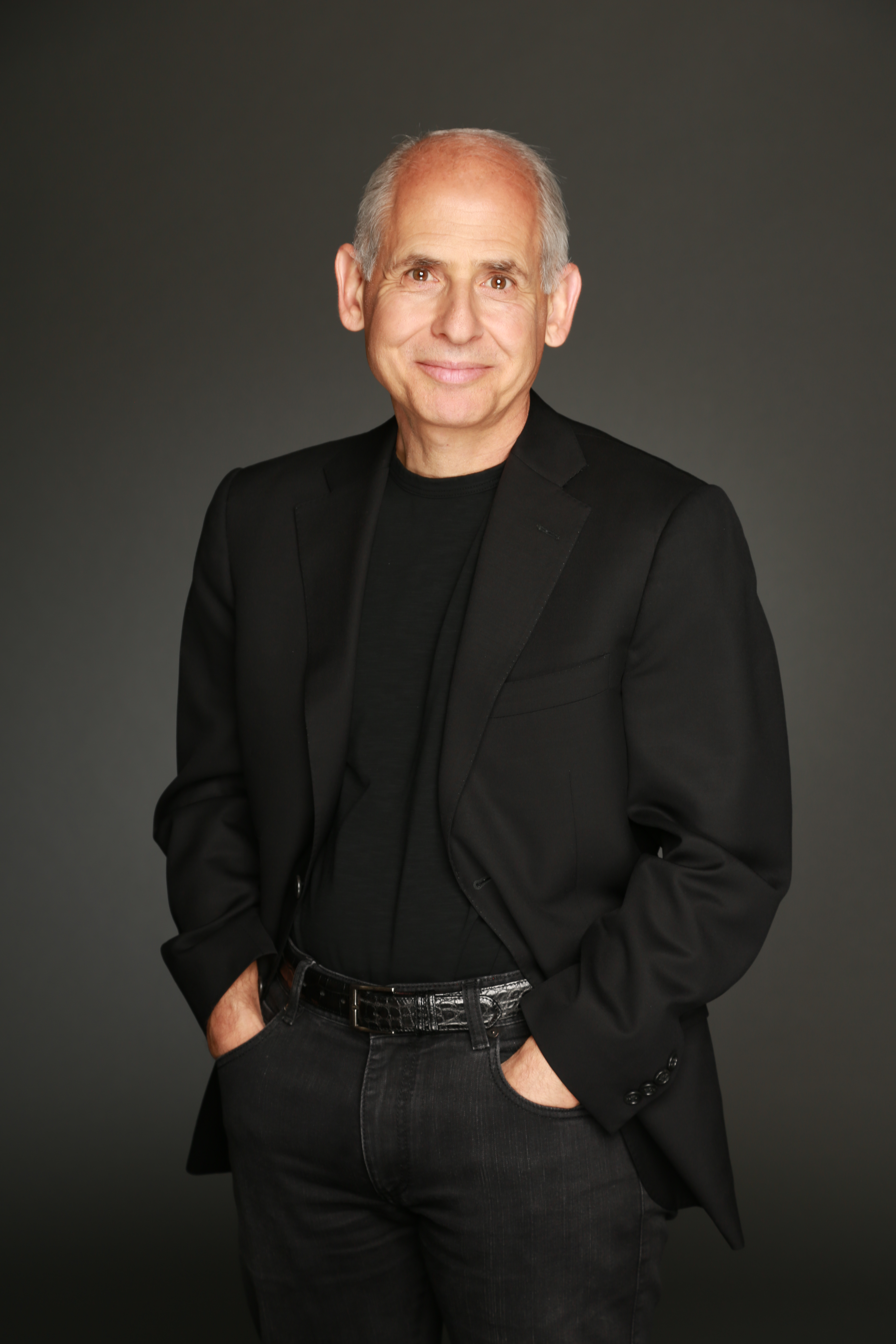
- Amen in 2014
- Born: 1954 (age 71–72); Encino, Los Angeles, California, U.S.
- Education: University of Maryland, West Germany; Orange Coast College; Vanguard University (BA); Oral Roberts University (MD)
- Occupations: Psychiatrist, researcher, author
- Website: danielamenmd.com

Daniel Gregory Amen (born 1954) is an American celebrity doctor who practices as a psychiatrist. He is the founder and chief executive officer (CEO) of Amen Clinics. He is also the founder of Change Your Brain Foundation, BrainMD, and Amen University. He is a twelve-time New York Times best-selling author as of 2023.

Amen has built a profitable business around the use of the controversial practice of SPECT (single-photon emission computed tomography) imaging for diagnostic purposes. His marketing of SPECT scans and much of what he says about the brain and health in his books, media appearances, and marketing of his clinics have been condemned by scientists and doctors as lacking scientific validity and as being unethical, especially since the way SPECT is used in his clinics exposes people to radiation with no clear benefit.

Amen has studied brain injuries affecting professional athletes and has consulted on post-concussion issues for the National Football League.

== Early life and education ==
Daniel Amen was born in Encino, California, in July 1954 to a Lebanese-American family. His father Louis became chairman of the board for Unified Grocers. After attending the University of Maryland Global Campus from 1974 to 1975, he went to Orange Coast College, where he received an AA degree in 1976. He subsequently obtained a BA degree in biology from Southern California College (now Vanguard University) in 1978, and an MD degree from Oral Roberts University School of Medicine in 1982. Amen did his general psychiatric training at the Walter Reed Army Medical Center in Washington, D.C., and his child and adolescent psychiatry training at Tripler Army Medical Center in Honolulu. Amen is board certified by the American Board of Psychiatry and Neurology in Psychiatry, with a subspecialty in Child and Adolescent Psychiatry.

== Career in business ==
Amen is the chief executive officer and medical director of the twelve Amen Clinics.

=== SPECT scanning ===
Amen's practices use single-photon emission computed tomography, or SPECT, scans of brain activity in an attempt to compare the activity of a person's brain to a known healthy model. Amen prescribes both medication and non-medicative courses of treatment, depending on the case. He also performs before-and-after SPECT scans, which claim to assess the effectiveness of treatment. An initial evaluation with SPECT at Amen's clinics cost about $4,000 in 2020. Amen's clinics claim to have the world's largest database of functional brain scans for neuropsychiatry. As of 2009, Amen said he had scanned 50,000 people at an estimated cost of $170 million.

The effectiveness of SPECT scans in treating psychiatric conditions has been the subject of scientific debate. John Seibyl of the Society of Nuclear Medicine and Molecular Imaging has stated that it is settled that SPECT is of no value for diagnosing psychological disorders. In 2008, Tufts professor and writer Daniel Carlat published an article on Amen's use of SPECT imaging. After visiting Amen's clinics, Carlat called Amen's interpretations of the scans "spectacularly meaningless".

A 2012 review by the American Psychiatric Association (APA) found that neuroimaging studies "have yet to impact significantly the diagnosis or treatment of individual patients." The review also states that neuroimaging studies "do not provide sufficient specificity and sensitivity to accurately classify individual cases with respect to the presence of a psychiatric illness." The APA has concluded that "the available evidence does not support the use of brain imaging for clinical diagnosis or treatment of psychiatric disorders in children and adolescents." According to cognitive neuroscience researcher Martha Farah and psychologist S. J. Gillihan, "[t]he lack of empirical validation has led to widespread condemnation of diagnostic SPECT as premature and unproven."

==== Ethics of SPECT scanning ====
Questions have been raised about the ethics of selling SPECT scans on the basis of unproven claims: neuroscience professor Martha Farah calls such use "profitable but unproven" and says, "Tens of thousands of individuals, many of them children, have been exposed to the radiation of two SPECT scans and paid thousands of dollars out of pocket (because insurers will not pay) against the advice of many experts". Professor of psychology Irving Kirsch has said of Amen's theory: "Before you start promulgating this and marketing it and profiting from it, you should ethically be bound to demonstrate it scientifically in a peer-reviewed, respected journal", as otherwise, "you're just going down the path of being a snake oil salesman".

In a 2011 paper, neuroscientist Anjan Chatterjee discussed example cases that were found on the Amen Clinic's website, including a couple with marital difficulties and a child with impulsive aggression. The paper noted that the examples "violate the standard of care" because a normal clinical diagnosis would have been sufficient and that there "was no reason to obtain functional neuroimaging for diagnostic purposes in these cases." Most patients do not realize that the SPECT scans rely on unproven claims. In 2021, Steven Hyman, director of the Stanley Center for Psychiatric Research, stated, "people who are desperate are vulnerable to snake oil, and this has all of the look and feel of a clinic that's preying on people's desperation."

As reported by The Washington Post in 2012, officials at major psychiatric and neuroscience associations and research centers see Amen's claims for the use of SPECT as "no more than myth and poppycock, buffaloing an unsuspecting public."

=== Work for athletes ===
One of Amen's clinics provides brain scans for current and former National Football League players. Amen made the initial diagnosis of brain damage in NFL kicker Tom Dempsey. During medical examinations and scans, Amen found three holes in Dempsey's brain, along with other damage. He has also provided diagnosis and therapy for hockey player Paul Kariya, related to his concussion issues; Amen advised Kariya to retire as a professional, which he did.

=== Dietary supplements ===
Amen's websites market vitamin supplements and a branded range of other dietary supplements. These supplements have been promoted for a number of purported health benefits, including a claimed ability to prevent or stop Alzheimer's disease. There is, however, no known benefit from taking such supplements except for specific substance deficiencies. Neurologist Robert Burton has written that he was "just appalled" by the things offered for sale on Amen's "big business" websites, and Harriet Hall has said that Amen prescribes "inadequately tested natural remedies" and "irrational mixtures of nutritional diet supplements" as part of his treatment.

== Career in media ==
=== Writing ===
Amen's first book, Change Your Brain, Change Your Life, published in 1999, appeared on The New York Times best seller list.

In his book Making a Good Brain Great, he provided his analysis and recommendations for brain improvement purported to enhance a person's overall happiness and ability. For example, he suggested that hobbies which challenge the brain are important to ensure a happy life, as he believes they force the brain to learn and evolve over time. Davi Thornton characterized the book as consisting of "commonplace recommendations for self-improvement".

Healing the Hardware of the Soul, written by Amen in 2008, was reviewed in the American Journal of Psychiatry by Andrew Leuchter. "Dr. Amen makes a good case for the use of brain imaging to explain and medicalize mental disorders", Leuchter said. "However, the reader who has any degree of familiarity with mental illness and brain science is left unconvinced that his [Amen's] highly commercialized use of scanning is justified." Leuchter concluded that Amen "has not subjected his treatment approaches to the level of systematic scientific scrutiny expected for scientifically based medical practice".

In Amen's The Brain in Love, he described the brain activity that occurs during chanting meditation as similar to that which takes place during the feeling of love and sexual activity.

In 2013, Amen co-authored with pastor Rick Warren The Daniel Plan: 40 Days to a Healthier Life, on "how to lead a healthy life". Amen was one of the people—others included Mark Hyman and Mehmet Oz—that Warren recruited to help devise the program. Warren encouraged adoption of the plan by all member churches in his network of Saddleback churches. According to Janice Norris, "The Daniel Plan is...more than a diet. It is a lifestyle program based on biblical principles and five essential components: food, fitness, focus, faith, and friends." Amen, Warren, and Hyman appeared on the television show The View to discuss the Daniel Plan, and 3,000 people came to a rally at Saddleback Church in Lake Forest, California, to hear the three talk about the plan.

In 2013, Amen released an updated version of Healing ADD from the Inside Out: The Breakthrough Program That Allows You to See and Heal the Seven Types of Attention Deficit Disorder.

In 2017, Amen and his wife, Tana, published The Brain Warrior's Way: Ignite Your Energy and Focus, Attack Illness and Aging, Transform Pain into Purpose, which Harriet Hall reviewed; she wrote: "Much of the advice in this book is mainstream medical advice, and there are helpful practical hints like putting your food on a smaller plate and not shopping for food when you are hungry. The problem is that the good advice is inextricably mixed with false information and misleading statements, and with detailed recommendations that are not supported by science."

=== Television programs ===
Amen has produced television programs about his theories. One of them, "Change Your Brain, Change Your Life", was aired by PBS affiliates 1,300 times in 2008 during fund-raising drives. Another, "Magnificent Mind at Any Age with Dr. Daniel Amen", was aired before January 1, 2009. Neurologist Michael Greicius, director of the Stanford Center for Memory Disorders and principal investigator of the Functional Imaging in Neuropsychiatric Disorders Laboratory at Stanford, stated, "The PBS airing of Amen's program provides a stamp of scientific validity to work which has no scientific validity." These programs have been described as infomercials for Amen's clinics. The program's depiction of the "wonders of ginkgo and other 'natural' products such as St. John's wort." was also criticized. Alternative-medicine skeptic and physician Harriet A. Hall and neurologist Robert A. Burton criticized PBS for the airing of these programs. Michael Getler, the PBS ombudsman, replied that "PBS had nothing to do with the 'Brain' program's content and did not vet the program in any way." Local PBS affiliates "make their own editorial decisions based on their own guidelines about what to air", he wrote.

== Reception of ideas ==
In 2012, The Washington Post Magazine ran a cover story titled "Daniel Amen is the most popular psychiatrist in America. To most researchers and scientists, that's a very bad thing." The Washington Post detailed Amen's lack of acceptance among the scientific community and his monetary conflict of interest. Journalist Sanjiv Bhattacharya wrote that Amen's critics likened him "to a self-help guru rather than a scientist, on account of all the books, DVDs and nutritional supplements which he hawks so shamelessly on infomercials" and that Amen was "the most controversial psychiatrist in America [who] may also be the most commercially successful". Amen has responded to such criticism by claiming that the criticism comes from jealousy of his financial success and also claiming that his largest source of referrals is from previous patients.

== Memberships and recognition ==
Amen is a Distinguished Fellow of the American Psychiatric Association (as recently as 2012). He has also been an assistant clinical behavioral professor of psychiatry and human behavior at the University of California, Irvine School of Medicine.

Amen is the author of more than 30 books, with combined sales of about one million copies. Five of his books have been The New York Times bestsellers as of 2012. In 2015, Amen's The Daniel Plan received the Christian Book of the Year Award from the Evangelical Christian Publishers Association.

== Bibliography ==
- Change Your Brain, Change Your Life: The Breakthrough Program for Conquering Anxiety, Depression, Obsessiveness, Anger, and Impulsiveness (1999) ISBN 9780748114689
- Healing the Hardware of the Soul: Enhance Your Brain to Improve Your Work, Love, and Spiritual Life (2002) ISBN 9780743242356
- Healing Anxiety and Depression: Based on Cutting-Edge Brain-Imaging Science Amen and Lisa C. Routh (2004) ISBN 0425198448
- Images of Human Behavior: A Brain SPECT Atlas (2004) ISBN 9781886554047
- ADD in Intimate Relationships (2005) ISBN 9781886554191
- Making a Good Brain Great: The Amen Clinic Program for Achieving and Sustaining Optimal Mental Performance (2006) ISBN 9781400082094
- Sex on the Brain (2007) ISBN 9780307339072
- Magnificent Mind at Any Age: Natural Ways to Unleash Your Brain's Maximum Potential (2008) ISBN 9780307339096
- The Brain in Love: 12 Lessons to Enhance Your Love Life (2009) ISBN 9780307587893
- Unchain Your Brain: 10 Steps to Breaking the Addictions That Steal Your Life (2010) ISBN 9781886554382
- The Amen Solution: The Brain Healthy Way to Get Thinner, Smarter, Happier (2011) ISBN 9780307463616
- Use Your Brain to Change Your Age: Secrets to Look, Feel, and Think Younger Every Day (2012) ISBN 9780307888938
- The Daniel Plan: 40 Days to a Healthier Life (2013) ISBN 9780310344308
- Unleash the Power of the Female Brain: Supercharging Yours for Better Health, Energy, Mood, Focus, and Sex (2013) ISBN 9780307888945
- Healing ADD Revised Edition: The Breakthrough Program that Allows You to See and Heal the 7 Types of ADD (2013) ISBN 9780425269978
- Healing ADD Brain Type Test (2014) ISBN 9781886554573
- Change Your Brain, Change Your Life: The Breakthrough Program for Conquering Anxiety, Depression, Obsessiveness, Anger, and Impulsiveness (revised) (2015)ISBN 9781101904640
- The Brain Warrior's Way Cookbook: Over 100 Recipes to Ignite Your Energy and Focus, Attack Illness and Aging, Transform Pain into Purpose (2016) ISBN 9780143109112
- Memory Rescue: Supercharge Your Brain, Reverse Memory Loss, and Remember What Matters Most (2017) ISBN 9781496425607
- Captain Snout and the Super Power Questions (2017) ISBN 9780310758327
- The Brain Warrior's Way: Ignite Your Energy and Focus, Attack Illness and Aging, Transform Pain into Purpose (2017) ISBN 9781101988480
- Stones of Remembrance (2017) ISBN 1496425960
- Feel Better Fast and Make It Last: Unlock Your Brain's Healing Potential to Overcome Negativity, Anxiety, Anger, Stress, and Trauma (2018) ISBN 1496430999
- The End of Mental Illness: How Neuroscience Is Transforming Psychiatry and Helping Prevent or Reverse Mood and Anxiety Disorders, ADHD, Addictions, PTSD, Psychosis, Personality Disorders, and More (2020) ISBN 9781496438157
- Your Brain Is Always Listening: Tame the Hidden Dragons That Control Your Happiness, Habits, and Hang-Ups (2021) ISBN 9781496438218
- You, Happier: The 7 Neuroscience Secrets of Feeling Good Based on Your Brain Type (2022) ISBN 9781496454553
- Change Your Brain Every Day: Simple Daily Practices to Strengthen Your Mind, Memory, Moods, Focus, Energy, Habits, and Relationships (2023) ISBN 9781496454607
- Conquer Your Negative Thoughts (2023) ISBN 9781496457660
- 30% Happier in 30 Days (2023) ISBN 9781496472366
