= Michael P. Hengartner =

Michael Pascal Hengartner MSc, PhD
- Education: Master of Science (MSc): clinical psychology, psychopathology, and criminology (2009); Doctor of Philosophy (PhD): psychology (2013)
- Occupations: Psychologist; Professor; Medical researcher
- Years active: 2010–present
- Medical career
- Profession: Professor; Psychologist; Researcher
- Institutions: Section for Clinical Psychology and Health Psychology, ZHAW School of Applied Psychology
- Research: Psychiatry; Psychology
- Notable works: Evidence-biased Antidepressant Prescription Overmedicalisation, Flawed Research, and Conflicts of Interest (Hengartner, 2022)

Michael Pascal Hengartner is an academic psychologist at the Zurich University of Applied Sciences who has published on the subject of antidepressants and in other areas. In 2022, he published a book called Evidence-Biased Antidepressant Prescription: Overmedicalisation, Flawed Research, and Conflicts of Interest. He has also published with other notable researchers such as Joanna Moncrieff and Irving Kirsch.

== Selected publications ==
=== Books ===
- Hengartner, Michael P. (2022). Evidence-Biased Antidepressant Prescription: Overmedicalisation, Flawed Research, and Conflicts of Interest. Springer International Publishing. doi:10.1007/978-3-030-82587-4. ISBN 978-3-030-82586-7.

=== Papers ===
- Hengartner, Michael P.; Plöderl, Martin (July 2018). "False Beliefs in Academic Psychiatry: The Case of Antidepressant Drugs". Ethical Human Psychology and Psychiatry. 20 (1): 6–16. doi:10.1891/1559-4343.20.1.6. eISSN 1938-9000. ISSN 1559-4343. S2CID 149608377.
- Hengartner MP, Plöderl M (2018). "Statistically Significant Antidepressant-Placebo Differences on Subjective Symptom-Rating Scales Do Not Prove That the Drugs Work: Effect Size and Method Bias Matter!". Front Psychiatry. 9 517. doi:10.3389/fpsyt.2018.00517. PMC 6199395. PMID 30386270.
- Hengartner MP, Jakobsen JC, Sørensen A, Plöderl M (2020). "Efficacy of new-generation antidepressants assessed with the Montgomery-Asberg Depression Rating Scale, the gold standard clinician rating scale: A meta-analysis of randomised placebo-controlled trials". PLOS ONE. 15 (2) e0229381. Bibcode:2020PLoSO..1529381H. doi:10.1371/journal.pone.0229381. PMC 7043778. PMID 32101579.
- Hengartner MP (2020). "How effective are antidepressants for depression over the long term? A critical review of relapse prevention trials and the issue of withdrawal confounding". Ther Adv Psychopharmacol. 10 2045125320921694. doi:10.1177/2045125320921694. PMC 7225779. PMID 32435449.
- Hengartner MP (April 2020). "Is there a genuine placebo effect in acute depression treatments? A reassessment of regression to the mean and spontaneous remission". BMJ Evid Based Med. 25 (2): 46–48. doi:10.1136/bmjebm-2019-111161. PMID 30975717.
- Hengartner MP, Plöderl M (April 2022). "Estimates of the minimal important difference to evaluate the clinical significance of antidepressants in the acute treatment of moderate-to-severe depression". BMJ Evid Based Med. 27 (2): 69–73. doi:10.1136/bmjebm-2020-111600. hdl:11475/22199. PMID 33593736. S2CID 231939760.
- Moncrieff J, Cooper RE, Stockmann T, Amendola S, Hengartner MP, Horowitz MA (July 2022). "The serotonin theory of depression: a systematic umbrella review of the evidence". Mol Psychiatry. 28 (8): 3243–3256. doi:10.1038/s41380-022-01661-0. PMC 10618090. PMID 35854107. S2CID 250646781.

== See also ==
- Amplified placebo effect
