= Robert Hahn =

Robert Hahn may refer to:

- Robert A. Hahn (born 1945), American medical anthropologist and epidemiologist
- Robert C. Hahn (1921–1996), American lawyer and politician from Massachusetts
- Robert Hahn (professor) (born 1952), American philosopher
- Bob Hahn (1925–2009), American basketball player
