= The Emperor's New Drugs =

2009 book by Irving Kirsch

The Emperor's new drugs: exploding the antidepressant myth
- First edition, 2009
- Author: Irving Kirsch
- Subject: The efficacy of antidepressants
- Publisher: The Bodley Head
- Pages: 226
- ISBN: 978-0465020164

The Emperor's New Drugs: Exploding the Antidepressant Myth is a 2009 book by Irving Kirsch, arguing that the chemical imbalance theory of depression is wrong and that antidepressants have little or no direct effect on depression but, because of their common or serious side-effects, they are powerful active placebos.

== Author ==
Kirsch is Associate Director of the Program in Placebo Studies and a lecturer in medicine at the Harvard Medical School and Beth Israel Deaconess Medical Center, and professor emeritus of psychology at the Universities of Hull and Plymouth in the United Kingdom, and the University of Connecticut in the United States. His research interests include placebo effects, antidepressants, expectancy, and hypnosis. He is the originator of response expectancy theory.

== Argument ==
While analyzing antidepressant trials as part of his research into the placebo effect, Kirsch realised that drug companies do not publish all of their disappointing antidepressant trial results, but most decisions about the efficacy of an antidepressant are based only on published results. Using the Freedom of Information Act, he and his colleagues acquired from the US Food and Drug Administration the unpublished trial results for six antidepressants. When the results from both published and unpublished studies were averaged, the researchers concluded that the drugs produced a small but clinically meaningless improvement in mood compared with an inert placebo (sugar pill). (Some researchers have questioned the statistical basis of this study suggesting that it underestimates the effect size of antidepressants and other studies have reached a range of supporting and conflicting conclusions.)

To determine whether their averaging of results was hiding a meaningful benefit to more-severely depressed patients by combining their results with those of moderately and mildly depressed patients, he and his colleagues undertook another study, this time of the four new-generation antidepressants for which all (published and unpublished) trial data were available, and concluded that the difference between drug and placebo effect was greater for more-severely depressed patients, and that this difference was clinically meaningful (but still relatively small) only at the upper end of the very severely depressed category. They attributed this difference to very seriously depressed patients being less responsive to the inert placebo.

Kirsch also addresses the conclusions of STAR*D, which found that if one antidepressant doesn't work on a patient, another should be tried in its place, and then another, until hopefully one will be found to be effective. The 2004 study found that although only 37% of patients were helped by the first antidepressant tried, 67% had found some relief by the time they had tried the fourth. Kirsch cites a 1957 study in which volunteers were given a drug that induces nausea and one to treat nausea. If the anti-nausea drug failed to prevent nausea, they were given another. If that failed, another was tried; and so on. All volunteers experienced complete relief from nausea by the sixth treatment, yet every treatment was a placebo. He concludes that the results of the 2004 antidepressant study are also likely due to the placebo effect.

Since the chemical-imbalance theory of depression is based on the efficacy of antidepressants, Kirsch concludes, "It now seems beyond question that the traditional account of depression as a chemical imbalance in the brain is simply wrong."

== Reception and impact ==
The European Psychiatric Association published a position paper in 2012 that described Kirsch's argument as "misleading". The organization argues that

- The mathematical treatment of the data was flawed and underestimates the efficacy of antidepressants;
- The analysis incorrectly focuses on mean differences between groups and ignores important subgroup effects;
- The size effect cutoff of 0.50 is arbitrary and not demonstrated to be clinically meaningful;
- That efficacy measured by the 15–20% difference between placebo and active antidepressant treatment in rate of remission corresponds to moderate to strong efficacy in evidence-based medicine analyses; and
- Kirsch's analysis disregards the results of double-blind, placebo controlled maintenance studies that show highly statistically significant effects on the rate of relapse for those treated with antidepressants relative to those receiving placebo.

Marcia Angell's review of the book welcomes Kirsch's work as a long overdue application of the scientific method to a field lacking rigorous scientific analysis, stating "Kirsch is a faithful proponent of the scientific method, and his voice therefore brings a welcome objectivity to a subject often swayed by anecdotes, emotions, or, as we will see, self-interest."

Psychiatrist Daniel Carlat called the book "an important book, with the reservation that Kirsch’s selective use of data gives him the appearance of an anti-antidepressant partisan." He states that Irving's conclusions are "provocative but unconvincing", noting that many drugs such as benzodiazepines have been tested for antidepressant activity and found inactive. Carlat argues that if antidepressants were acting purely via a placebo effect, any benzodiazepines and other drugs would show activity as well.

In a 2012 episode of CBS's 60 Minutes featuring Kirsch and his book, host Lesley Stahl said, "The medical community is at war – battling over the scientific research and writings of a psychologist named Irving Kirsch ... Kirsch and his studies have triggered a furious counterattack, mainly from psychiatrists."

After the program's airing, Jeffrey Lieberman, the American Psychiatric Association's president elect at the time, said, "Dr. Kirsch is mistaken and confused, and he's ideologically biased in his thinking. He is conducting an analysis and interpreting the data to support his ideologically biased perspective. What he is concluding is inaccurate, and what he is communicating is misleading to people and potentially harmful to those who really suffer from depression and would be expected to benefit from antidepressant medication. To say that antidepressants are no better than placebo is just plain wrong."

Reviews in the lay press have been largely positive, and the book was shortlisted in 2010 for the Mind Book of the Year award.

There have been two English-language editions of the book – one in the UK, one in the US – and it has been translated into Japanese, French, Italian, Turkish, and Polish.
