= Amen Clinics =

Group of health clinics

- Founded: 1989
- Founder: Daniel G. Amen
- Headquarters: United States
- Area served: Newport Beach, California, San Francisco, California, Atlanta, Georgia, Reston, Virginia, Bellevue, Washington, New York City
- Website: www.amenclinics.com

Amen Clinics is a chain of brain health clinics focused on the treatment of brain activity functions and psychiatric disorders. It was founded in 1989 by Daniel Amen an American medical doctor and psychiatrist. They use brain SPECT (single photon emission computed tomography) imaging to diagnose brain activity patterns in their patients. Amen's marketing of SPECT scans has been condemned by scientists and doctors as lacking scientific validity and as being unethical, especially since the way SPECT is used in his clinics exposes people to harmful radiation with no clear benefit.

== Operations ==
Amen Clinics were founded in 1989. Since 1991, the clinics have performed brain SPECT scans, purportedly to diagnose brain conditions that manifest as psychiatric health issues by evaluating the brain activity amount and location in the brain.

The effectiveness of SPECT scans in treating psychiatric conditions has been the subject of scientific debate. John Seibyl of the Society of Nuclear Medicine and Molecular Imaging has stated that it is settled that SPECT is of no value for diagnosing psychological disorders. In 2008, Tufts professor and writer Daniel Carlat published an article on Amen's use of SPECT imaging. After visiting Amen's clinics, Carlat called Amen's interpretations of the scans "spectacularly meaningless". Amen Clinics incorporates questionnaires (of clients and their family about the client together), clinical histories, and clinical interviews in its practice. Some Amen Clinics locations also use quantitative electroencephalography as a purported diagnostic tool.

As of 2026, Amen Clinics had a database of more than 200,000 functional brain SPECT scans. The clients are from over 100 countries with ages ranging from 9 months to 105 years old.
