= Open trial =

Open trial may refer to:

- Public trial
- Open-label trial, a type of clinical trial that is not blinded
