= Gerard Naddaf =

Canadian philosopher

Gerard Naddaf (b. North Sydney, Nova Scotia, 6 December 1950) is a Canadian philosopher and historian of ideas. Naddaf is a professor emeritus of philosophy at York University, Toronto, Ontario, Canada, and specializes in ancient Greek philosophy and, in particular, Plato and early Greek philosophy. Naddaf is best known for his work on the Greek concept of physis.

== Education ==
Naddaf graduated from the École Pratiques des Hautes Etudes in religious studies in Paris in 1980 and completed a doctorate of philosophy (Summa cum laude) at the Sorbonne in Paris in 1986. Both degrees were completed under the supervision of Pierre Hadot and Luc Brisson.

In 1987, Naddaf was awarded a two-year SSHRC post-doctoral fellowship, which was taken up in Classics at Dalhousie University in Halifax, Nova Scotia, Canada. Afterwards, in 1988, Naddaf took up a position in the Department of Philosophy at York University in Toronto, Ontario, where he remained until his retirement in 2020.

== Works ==
=== Authored and co-authored books ===
- Naddaf, Gerard (2024). Making Sense of Myth: Conversations with Luc Brisson. Montreal: McGill-Queen's University Press.
- Naddaf, Gerard (2005). The Greek Concept of Nature. Albany: State University of New York Press.
- Naddaf, Gerard; Couprie, Dirk L.; Hahn, Robert (2003). Anaximander in Context: New Studies in the Origins of Greek Philosophy. Albany: State University of New York Press.
- Naddaf, Gerard (translator, editor, and co-author); Brisson, Luc (author) (1998). Plato the Myth Maker. Chicago: University of Chicago Press.
- Naddaf, Gerard (1992). L'origen et l'évolution du concept Grec de phusis. Lewiston: The Edwin Mellen Press.
