= C18H21N3O =

The molecular formula C_{18}H_{21}N_{3}O (molar mass: 295.379 g/mol) may refer to:

- Dibenzepin
- Dimethyllysergamide (DAM-57)
- LAE-32, or D-Lysergic acid ethylamide
