= Joanna Moncrieff =

British critical psychiatrist

Joanna Margaret Moncrieff
- Born: 1966 (age 59–60)
- Education: University of Newcastle upon Tyne
- Scientific career
- Fields: Psychiatry; Neuroscience
- Workplaces: National Health Service; University College London
- Website: www.joannamoncrieff.com

Joanna Moncrieff is a British psychiatrist and academic. She is Professor of Critical and Social Psychiatry at University College London and a leading figure in the Critical Psychiatry Network. Her books The Myth of the Chemical Cure and The Bitterest Pills are central texts in the critical psychiatry movement. Moncrieff is known as the primary author of an umbrella review which found that depression is not caused by a chemical imbalance of serotonin.

She is critical of mainstream psychiatry's medical approach to mental illness. She has stated that while she does prescribe drugs to her patients sometimes, she is "not convinced that antidepressants have any use" and that there is a need "to find more non-medical ways of supporting people through crises".

Moncrieff argues against what she calls the "disease-centred" model of psychiatric drug action, where the drugs are hypothesized to correct for an abnormality and therefore restore normal functioning (similar to how insulin is given for diabetes). Instead, she has proposed that a "drug-centred" model better explains their effects, where the drugs themselves actually cause abnormal states or alterations which coincidentally relieve symptoms (similar to how alcohol's disinhibiting effect may relieve social phobia, but does not "correct" for a chemical imbalance).

Moncrieff's scientific contributions to psychiatry have been characterized as important; however, critics say her other conclusions about the use of antidepressants as a treatment are oversimplified, because they may have some other mechanism of action, and there are studies which otherwise suggest they are an effective treatment.

== Career ==
In 1989, Moncrieff qualified in medicine from the University of Newcastle upon Tyne, then trained in psychiatry during the 1990s. In 2001, she started at University College London (UCL), where she is currently a teacher and researcher. For 10 years, she was a consultant at a psychiatric rehabilitation inpatient unit, then worked in various community mental health services. Her current title is Professor of Critical and Social Psychiatry at UCL, and she is a consultant psychiatrist at North East London NHS Foundation Trust.

Moncrieff is a founder and co-chair of the Critical Psychiatry Network, a group founded in 1999 to scientifically challenge assumptions held by mainstream psychiatry about the nature of mental disorders and the effects of psychiatric interventions. The network now has over 400 members.

=== Politics ===
Moncrieff has stood (unsuccessfully) in multiple local UK elections as a Labour Party candidate.

In 2022, a Rolling Stone article criticized her because her research had been promoted by right-wing commentators, and because she had seemingly aligned with the political right on some other matters such as criticizing governmental COVID-19 vaccine mandates. Moncrieff has called the article "bizarre, gutter journalism", saying that she has always considered herself "on the left".

== Research and writing ==
=== Models of drug action ===
Moncrieff states she is not completely opposed to the use of drugs for mental health problems, but believes that the action of drugs in these situations is misunderstood. Moncrieff developed two alternative 'models' for understanding what drugs might be doing when they are prescribed to people with mental-health problems. The current mainstream understanding of psychiatric drug action is based on a 'disease-centred' model that suggests that drugs work by rectifying the underlying abnormality that is presumed to lead to the symptoms of the disorder in question.

Moncrieff contrasts this with an alternative 'drug-centred' model, which suggests that since psychiatric drugs are psychoactive substances, they work because they change the way people think, feel and behave. According to this model, psychiatric drugs have no specific biological effects in people with a mental disorder, and they produce their characteristic effects in everyone who takes them. The changes induced by some sorts of drugs may, however, lead to the suppression of the manifestations (symptoms) of some mental disorders.

The Myth of the Chemical Cure traces the emergence and development of the disease-centred model from the 1950s onwards. It purports to highlight the lack of evidence for the disease-centred model of drug action for every major class of psychiatric drug, despite the psychiatric consensus.

It also explores supposed commercial, professional and political interests behind the disease-centred model.

=== Antidepressants ===
Together with Mark Horowitz, in 2022 Moncrieff conducted the first systematic umbrella review of the evidence for the serotonin "chemical imbalance" theory of depression, which found that "there is no convincing evidence that depression is associated with, or caused by, lower serotonin concentrations or activity". The research has been called "important" and "the most comprehensive rebuttal to date". According to critics of Moncrieff, the conclusions of the paper are well-founded, but obvious because the serotonin theory has not been viewed as serious for awhile. Moncrieff believes that depression should be seen as a "mood state" rather than an illness, and argues that it's a largely normal reaction to adverse circumstances which some people are more prone to than others.

Andrea Cipriani, the author of a 2018 systematic review published in The Lancet which found all antidepressants included in the study to be more effective than placebo, has been quoted as saying that what Moncrieff is doing—challenging evidence and asking questions—is very important. While still defending the use of antidepressants, Cipriani has agreed that the effect of their active ingredient is "not big". Citing one study published in the New England Journal of Medicine which found patients who came off antidepressants were more likely to relapse than those who maintained treatment, Cipriani disagreed with Moncrieff's view that antidepressants don't work long term. Moncrieff and Horowitz have argued such studies are suspect because they mislabel antidepressant withdrawal syndrome as relapse.

Moncrieff's view that antidepressants are overused is not held by most mainstream mental health experts, such as the Royal College of Psychiatrists. Awais Aftab, a psychiatrist at Case Western Reserve University, has commented on Moncrieff's 2025 book Chemically Imbalanced calling her opinions "controversial" and "well outside the clinical and scientific consensus".

Moncrieff's review was widely covered in the media at the time, but also adopted and misinterpreted by right-wing commentators as evidence that antidepressants do not work as a treatment for depression.

In 2025, the U. S. Food and Drug Administration held a panel to debate a black box warning for SSRI use during pregnancy, bringing a host of expert panelists to voice concerns such as the potential for miscarriage and birth defects—concerns which were later criticized by several healthcare provider groups, with other experts arguing over the interpretation of studies. The panel was criticized by the American College of Obstetricians and Gynecologists as "alarmingly unbalanced" and full of "outlandish and unfounded claims"; the Society for Maternal-Fetal Medicine said it was "alarmed by the unsubstantiated and inaccurate claims". Moncrieff additionally appeared on the panel to share information about antidepressants and suicide risk in youth, and make the controversial claim that antidepressants are barely distinguishable from placebo. Since Prozac's approval for depression almost four decades ago, a consensus emerged that although antidepressants may be associated with a slight risk of birth defects, untreated depression is often the greater risk.

=== Antipsychotics ===
The Bitterest Pills traces the history of antipsychotic drugs from the introduction of chlorpromazine in the 1950s. The book also looks at recent developments, including the marketing of antipsychotics through the Early Intervention movement, and the promotion of a new and expanded concept of bipolar disorder. Moncrieff also describes the cultural development of the new concept of bipolar disorder, which she refers to as ‘the medicalisation of "ups and downs"’. Research by Moncrieff and colleagues described and compared the subjective or psychoactive effects of different antipsychotics.

In 2023, Moncrieff published results from the NIHR-funded Research into Antipsychotic Discontinuation and Reduction (RADAR) trial. This study was meant to evaluate the feasibility of antipsychotic dose reduction programs for people with schizophrenia or similar problems. Half of the participants were put on a personalized dose-reduction plan, while the other half (the maintenance group) stayed on the same dose. The study found that after 2 years, participants in the dose-reduction group had no improvement in social and life functioning (caring for oneself, work, study, etc.), side-effects, quality of life, body weight, or other outcomes, and were twice as likely to relapse (25%) as participants in the maintenance group (13%). However, interviews found that many who attempted the reduction program had a positive experience, feeling empowered by the opportunity, or coming to accept their need for the medication. Moncrieff intends on a further 4- to 7-year assessment in a follow-up study.

=== Psychedelic drugs ===
Moncrieff has critiqued the use and study of psychedelic and related drugs, including psilocybin, LSD, MDMA, ketamine, and esketamine, for the treatment of psychiatric disorders like depression, highlighting a variety of concerns with regard to these agents.

=== Other drugs ===
Moncrieff has critically reviewed the literature on lithium, as well as the use of drug treatments like acamprosate and naltrexone for alcohol problems. She has also written about the use of stimulants in children. For example, according to an early Ritalin trial, the children became "distinctly more bland or 'flat' emotionally". Moncrieff claims children do not like being on stimulants.

=== History and politics of psychiatry ===
Moncrieff has developed a political analysis of the drivers of modern mental health theory and practice and explored the influence of neoliberalism. She has published papers on the historical context of the emergence of modern drug treatment, the history of psychiatric thought in the 20th century and of "rapid tranquilisation" in psychiatry, as well as her books on the history of drug treatments.

== Books ==
- Moncrieff, Joanna (2008). The Myth of the Chemical Cure: A Critique of Psychiatric Drug Treatment. Macmillan. ISBN 978-0-230-57431-1.
- Moncrieff, Joanna (2009). A Straight Talking Introduction to Psychiatric Drugs. PCCS Books. ISBN 978-1-906254-17-9.
- Moncrieff, Joanna (2013). The Bitterest Pills: The Troubling Story of Antipsychotic Drugs. Palgrave Macmillan UK. ISBN 978-1-137-27742-8.
- Moncrieff, Joanna (2025). Chemically Imbalanced: The Making and Unmaking of the Serotonin Myth. History Press Limited. ISBN 978-1-80399-679-0.

== See also ==
- Amplified placebo effect
