= Allocation concealment =

Concept in randomized experiments

In a randomized experiment, allocation concealment hides the sorting of trial participants into treatment groups so that this knowledge cannot be exploited. Adequate allocation concealment serves to prevent study participants from influencing treatment allocations for subjects. Studies with poor allocation concealment (or none at all) are prone to selection bias.

Some standard methods of ensuring allocation concealment include sequentially numbered, opaque, sealed envelopes (SNOSE); sequentially numbered containers; pharmacy controlled randomization; and central randomization. CONSORT guidelines recommend that allocation concealment methods be included in a study's protocol, and that the allocation concealment methods be reported in detail in their publication; however, a 2005 study determined that most clinical trials have unclear allocation concealment in their protocols, in their publications, or both. A 2008 study of 146 meta-analyses concluded that the results of randomized controlled trials with inadequate or unclear allocation concealment tended to be biased toward beneficial effects only if the trials' outcomes were subjective as opposed to objective.

Allocation concealment is different from blinding. An allocation concealment method prevents influence on the randomization process, while blinding conceals the outcome of the randomization. However, allocation concealment may also be called "randomization blinding".

== Impact ==
Without the use of allocation concealment, researchers may (consciously or unconsciously) place subjects expected to have good outcomes in the treatment group, and those expected to have poor outcomes in the control group. This introduces considerable bias in favor of treatment.

== Naming ==
Allocation concealment has also been called randomization blinding, blinded randomization, and bias-reducing allocation among other names. The term 'allocation concealment' was first introduced by Shultz et al. The authors justified the introduction of the term:

“The reduction of bias in trials depends crucially upon preventing foreknowledge of treatment assignment. Concealing assignments until the point of allocation prevents foreknowledge, but that process has sometimes been confusingly referred to as 'randomization blinding'. This term, if used at all, has seldom been distinguished clearly from other forms of blinding (masking) and is unsatisfactory for at least three reasons. First, the rationale for generating comparison groups at random, including the steps taken to conceal the assignment schedule, is to eliminate selection bias. By contrast, other forms of blinding, used after the assignment of treatments, serve primarily to reduce ascertainment bias. Second, from a practical standpoint, concealing treatment assignment up to the point of allocation is always possible, regardless of the study topic, whereas blinding after allocation is not attainable in many instances, such as in trials conducted to compare surgical and medical treatments. Third, control of selection bias pertains to the trial as a whole, and thus to all outcomes being compared, whereas control of ascertainment bias may be accomplished successfully for some outcomes, but not for others. Thus, concealment up to the point of allocation of treatment and blinding after that point address different sources of bias and differ in their practicability. In light of those considerations, we refer to the former as 'allocation concealment' and reserve the term 'blinding' for measures taken to conceal group identity after allocation”

== Subversion and fraud ==
Traditionally, each patient's treatment allocation data was stored in a sealed envelopes, which was to be opened to determine treatment allocation. However, this system is prone to abuse. Reports of researchers opening envelopes prematurely or holding the envelopes up to lights to determine their contents has led some researchers to say that the use of sealed envelopes is no longer acceptable. As of 2016, sealed envelopes were still in use in some clinical trials.

Modern clinical trials often use centralized allocation concealment. Although considered more secure, central allocations are not completely immune from subversion. Typical and sometimes successful strategies include keeping a list of previous allocations (up to 15% of study personnel report keeping lists).

== See also ==
- Blinded experiment
- Design of experiments
- Randomized experiment
- Metascience
- Sealedenvelope.com—a provider of allocation concealment services
