= Sealedenvelope.com =

British collaboration that provides support services for clinical trials

Sealedenvelope.com is British collaboration that provides support services for clinical trials. They provide services such as randomization, allocation concealment, code-break services, and case report management through a web-based design. They also perform certain calculations such as power calculations.
