= Code-break procedure =

Set of rules which determine when planned unblinding should occur in a blinded e

A code-break procedure, also called an unblinding procedure, specifies how and under what circumstances masked information may be revealed during a blinded clinical trial. FDA guidelines recommend that sponsors of blinded trials include a code-break procedure in their standard operating procedure. A code-break procedure should only allow a participant to be unblinded before the conclusion of a trial in the event of an emergency. Code-break usually refers to the unmasking of treatment allocation, but can refer to any form of unblinding.

== History ==
Traditionally, each patient's treatment allocation data was stored in a sealed envelopes, which was to be opened to break code. However, this system is prone to abuse. Reports of researchers opening envelopes prematurely or holding the envelopes up to lights to determine their contents has led some researchers to say that the use of sealed envelopes is no longer acceptable. As of 2016, sealed envelopes were still in use in some clinical trials. Modern clinical trials usually store this information in computer files.

== See also ==
- Sealedenvelope.com – a provider of code-break services
