= Inverse placebo effect =

Psychological phenomenon in medicine

The inverse placebo effect, also known as the "knowcebo" effect (or "know-cebo" effect) or suppressed placebo effect, is a phenomenon in psychology and medicine in which a person in a blinded clinical trial knows that they have received placebo due to functional unblinding problems and this results in the person experiencing diminished placebo effects. The effect is especially relevant in trials of strongly psychoactive drugs such as psychedelics.

There are large placebo responses and effects in clinical trials of psychiatric drugs such as antidepressants and anxiolytics. For example, traditional antidepressants typically improve depressive symptoms by about 10 points on a depression rating scale, whereas placebos improve symptoms by about 8 points on the scale, with about a 2-point advantage for antidepressant over placebo and at least 80% of the treatment benefit being attributable to the placebo response. The placebo response consists of the placebo effect (i.e., positive expectations) and of other components such as regression to the mean, spontaneous remission, and methodological bias.

The inverse placebo effect is known to occur prominently in clinical trials of treatments that have overt psychoactive effects and are impossible to blind such as psychedelic drugs like psilocybin, other hallucinogens like ketamine, and entactogens like MDMA. In these kinds of contexts, it is usually very obvious to a person when they receive a placebo instead of the drug due to the lack of expected psychological changes, and this results in disappointment and a diminished placebo response. Whereas placebos in traditional antidepressant trials reduce depressive symptoms typically by around 8 points, they have been found to reduce symptoms by around 4 points in psychedelic drug trials, a decrease and hence diminished improvement of approximately 50% attributable to the inverse placebo effect. In general, functional unblinding, for instance due to often obvious side effects, is known to amplify differences in improvement between active drugs and placebos, including in the case of traditional antidepressants.

The inverse placebo effect can result in inflated effect sizes in terms of differences in improvement between active drug and placebo and can thereby distort clinical trial findings. Psychedelic drugs may improve depressive symptoms typically by around 10 to 12 points in clinical trials, similar to the improvement with traditional antidepressants. Due to the inverse placebo effect and blunted placebo-group improvement however, the difference in improvement between the psychedelic drug and placebo can be much greater than with a traditional antidepressant (e.g., 6–7 points instead of 2 points). This in turn results in an illusion of unusually large effect sizes. It has been found that the inverse placebo effect or placebo suppression accounts for approximately 55% of the difference in improvement between psychedelics and placebo.

When psychedelics have instead been indirectly compared to open-label traditional antidepressants rather than to placebos and hence there are equal unblinding conditions, it has been found that there is no difference in effectiveness between psychedelics and traditional antidepressants. Similarly, in a direct head-to-head trial with no placebo group, psilocybin was no more effective than the selective serotonin reuptake inhibitor (SSRI) and traditional antidepressant escitalopram (Lexapro) for treating depression. Due to their strong psychoactive effects and unblinding, psychedelics themselves have been found to effectively always be open-label (~90–95% correct treatment-allocation guess rate).

Concerns about functional unblinding and consequent amplified placebo and inverse placebo effects prominently contributed to the rejection of the MDMA for the treatment of post-traumatic stress disorder (PTSD) by the Food and Drug Administration (FDA) in the United States in 2024. On the other hand, the FDA approved esketamine (Spravato) for treatment-resistant depression in 2019 despite significant albeit less marked problems with unblinding and potential amplified placebo effects as well.

== See also ==
- Lessebo effect
- Amplified placebo effect
