= Therapeutic effect =

Beneficial change in medical condition, often caused by a drug

Therapeutic effect refers to the response(s) after a treatment of any kind, the results of which are judged to be useful or favorable. This is true whether the result was expected, unexpected, or even an unintended consequence. An adverse effect (including nocebo) is the converse and refers to harmful or undesired response(s). What constitutes a therapeutic effect versus a side effect is a matter of both the nature of the situation and the goals of treatment. No inherent difference separates therapeutic and undesired side effects; both responses are behavioral/physiologic changes that occur as a response to the treatment strategy or agent.

== Treatment scope ==
To maximize therapeutic effects (desired) and minimize side effects (undesired) requires recognition and quantification of the treatment in multiple dimensions. In the specific case of targeted pharmaceutical interventions, a combination of therapies is often needed to achieve the desired results.

== Pharmacology examples ==
- A 2015 review found that aloe vera exhibits therapeutic antioxidant, antimicrobial, immune boosting, antitumor, hypoglycemic, hypolipidemic, wound healing, and antidiabetic effects.
- Also in 2015, a review found that probiotics were beneficial in the treatment of irritable bowel syndrome.
- Again in 2015 another review found that Rituximab was therapeutic in the treatment of myasthenia gravis, an autoimmune disorder.
- A 2016 review found that the adjunctive use of standardized pharmaceutical-grade nutrients, known as nutraceuticals, had a therapeutic effect in patients with depression.
- Also in 2016, a review found that despite limited data botulinum toxin type A may be beneficial for the treatment of trigeminal neuralgia paroxysms and suggests further study.

== Non-pharmacology examples ==
- A 2014 review found there was a strong therapeutic benefit from stem cell therapy on organ recovery from injury and that it may also inhibit tumor growth.
- A 2015 review found that mindfulness based interventions had a therapeutic effect on stress reduction for mental illness.
- Also in 2015, a review showed that irradiation with low level laser therapy had the therapeutic effect of increasing in vitro stem cell proliferation rates.
- A 2017 review showed aerobic and resistance exercise had a therapeutic effect on the physical and mental well-being of cancer survivors.
- Also in 2017, a review found that low-intensity extracorporeal shock wave treatment was therapeutic in the treatment of erectile dysfunction.
