= Single-arm study design =

A single-arm study design is a type of clinical or experimental study where all participants receive the same intervention, with no control or placebo group. The term "single-arm" refers to the presence of only one participant group, in contrast to designs such as randomized controlled trials, which include both a treatment arm and control or placebo arm.

== Overview ==
Single-arm trials include one experimental group without the inclusion of a parallel control group. The design is open-label and does not involve randomization or blinding. This type of study design is commonly applied to advanced stage cancer, rare diseases, emerging infectious diseases, new treatment methods, and medical devices.

While randomized control trials are considered the “gold standard” in clinical research, they are not always feasible due to limitations in the study population, challenges in obtaining evidence, high costs, and ethical considerations. As a result, single arm trials are used to address these concerns.

== Applications ==
Since there is no randomization in single-arm trials, all patients receive the same intervention within a particular study/trial. This design is most commonly used in early-phase clinical trials or in studies of rare or serious diseases, where including a control group may be impractical or unethical.

- Phase I studies primarily assess safety, tolerability, and pharmacokinetics over a relatively short duration. They are used to inform dose selection for subsequent studies.
- Phase II studies primarily assess preliminary efficacy over a longer duration (months to years). They are used to support proof-of-concept assessments.

== Interpreting results ==
With the absence of a control group, effectiveness is measured against an external standard. This can include benchmarks established from previous studies or historical control data, and are used to define minimum efficacy thresholds and expected performance ranges.

In oncology, time-to-event outcomes such as progression-free survival and overall survival may be used to assess treatment effects.

== Bias and limitations ==
Without a control group or randomization there are several sources of bias. Differences in patient selection, baseline characteristics, and clinical management may affect observed outcomes. Confounding variables cannot be fully controlled, and causal relationships cannot be established with certainty.
