= Robert A. Hahn =

American epidemiologist

Robert Alfred Hahn
- Born: 1945 (age 80–81)
- Education: Cornell University, Harvard University, University of Washington
- Awards: 2013 Lifetime Contribution Award for Outstanding Dedication to Excellence in Behavioral and Social Science from the CDC, 2012 Career Achievement Award from the Society for Medical Anthropology
- Scientific career
- Fields: Anthropology, epidemiology
- Workplaces: Centers for Disease Control and Prevention's Guide to Community Preventive Services
- Thesis: Rikbakca categories of social relations: an epistemological analysis (1976)

Robert A. Hahn (born 1945) is an American medical anthropologist and epidemiologist. As of 2015, he was a coordinating scientist of systematic reviews for the Guide to Community Preventive Services at the Centers for Disease Control and Prevention (CDC).

== Education ==
The son of German refugee parents, Hahn received his B.A. from Cornell University in 1966, his PhD in anthropology from Harvard University in 1976, and his MPH in epidemiology from the University of Washington in 1986.

== Career ==
Hahn began his career working at the CDC in 1986 and has remained there ever since. While there, he helped found the Behavioral and Social Science Working Group. From 1998 to 1999, he worked as a fellow in the United States House Committee on Veterans' Affairs and in the office of Congresswoman Louise Slaughter. As of 2015, he was also a member of the Senior Biomedical Research Service.

== Research ==
As a coordinating scientist of systematic reviews in the CDC's Guide to Community Preventive Services, Hahn has published reviews on subjects such as excessive alcohol consumption and violence prevention, as well as interventions to promote health equity. He has also done research on the nocebo effect, and has said that one reason the medical community has been hesitant to research it because belief is not very highly valued in the modern medical community, which tends to focus more on anatomy.

== Honors and awards ==
Hahn received the Career Achievement Award by the Society for Medical Anthropology in 2012. He also received the Lifetime Contribution Award from the CDC's Behavioral and Social Science Working Group in 2013 for his work in founding the group.
