= Robert Hahn (professor) =

American philosopher (born 1952)

Robert Hahn (born in New York City, 25 August 1952) is an American philosopher and professor of philosophy, emeritus, in the College of Liberal Arts at Southern Illinois University Carbondale. Hahn's teaching interests and specialties included ancient Greek philosophy, history of philosophy, history of science (astronomy and mathematics - especially geometry), Kant, modern philosophy, ethics, and logic. His research focused on ancient Egyptian and Greek architecture, its building technologies, ancient geometry, and metaphysics - connecting the origins of Greek philosophy with the historical, cultural, and technological contexts to the early Greek philosophers.

== Education ==
Hahn was named the Archibald Scholar and graduated as Valedictorian (Summa Cum Laude) from the College of Liberal Arts at Union College with his B.A. in Philosophy in 1973. He was elected into Phi Beta Kappa in 1972. During his undergraduate years, he also studied Sanskrit at the University of Chicago (Summer, 1972). Hahn began his first-year graduate studies at the University of California, Berkeley, transferring the following year to Yale University where he went on to earn three degrees: M.A. in Philosophy (1975), M.Phil. in Philosophy (1975), and Ph.D. in Philosophy (1976, when he was 23 years old). Hahn won Yale's Mary Cady Tew Prize for the Outstanding Graduate Student in Philosophy (1975) and the Jacob Cooper Prize in Greek Philosophy (1975) for an earlier draft of his dissertation. Hahn’s dissertation was entitled “Did Plato ‘Schematize’ the Forms: Structure, Value, and Time, in the Later Dialectical Dialogues,” directed by Karsten Harries and joined in committee by Robert S. Brumbaugh and Heinrich von Staden.

== Academic career ==
After graduating from Yale, in the fall of 1976, Hahn worked with Gregory Vlastos (who had recently left Princeton to become the Mills Professor of Philosophy) at the University of California at Berkeley, followed by an appointment back at Yale in the spring of 1977 as a Lecturer in philosophy. Subsequently, in 1977, Hahn was appointed to his first tenure-track position at the Arlington branch of the University of Texas, but left the next year for a 3-year appointment (1978–1981) jointly at Brandeis University (in the Department of Philosophy and the History of Ideas) and Harvard University (Continuing Education). At Brandeis, Hahn created the Boston Area Colloquium for Ancient Philosophy which is still functioning after more than forty-five years. Hahn was Visiting Professor of Philosophy at the American College of Greece (Deree College) from January to August 1980. In 1981, Hahn was an Assistant Professor of Philosophy at Denison University, and in 1982, joined the faculty of Southern Illinois University at Carbondale as an Assistant Professor of Philosophy in the College of Liberal Arts. While also holding an appointment as Acting Professor of Archaeology, Professor Hahn was granted a license by the Greek Ministry of Culture to lead groups at archaeological sites and museums; the license was renewed annually for more than 40 years. In that capacity, Hahn led 67 different 1/2-month Study Abroad programs to Greece, Türkiye, and Egypt, enrolling more than 1,200 participants. He was granted tenure and promoted to Associate Professor in 1988. Hahn was awarded both the Outstanding Teacher of the College and the Outstanding Educator of the University in 1993. He was promoted to full Professor in 2001. Hahn received the college’s 2024 Scholar Excellence Award and the 2025 University-Level Teaching Excellence Award for tenured and tenure-track faculty that carried with it the permanent title "Distinguished Teacher". After a 42 year career at Southern Illinois University Carbondale, Hahn retired on January 1, 2025, but has been appointed by Yale to teach courses in Ancient Philosophy in its Alumni College, starting in the spring of 2026.

== Books ==
- Kant's 'Newtonian Revolution' in Philosophy, The Journal of the History of Philosophy Monograph Series, January 1988.
- Anaximander and the Architects: The Contribution of Egyptian and Greek Architectural Technologies to the Origins of Greek Philosophy, Ancient Philosophy series, State University of New York Press, 2001. 2nd printing 2005.
- Anaximander in Context: New Studies on the Origins of Greek Philosophy, co-authored with Dirk Couprie and Gerard Naddaf, Ancient Philosophy series, State University of New York Press, 2003, 2nd printing 2004. Hahn's section is “Numbers and Proportions in Anaximander and Early Greek Thought” pp. 72–163.
- Archaeology and the Origins of Philosophy, Ancient Philosophy series, State University of New York Press, 2010; paperback edition 2011.
- The Metaphysics of the Pythagorean Theorem: Thales, Pythagoras, Engineering, Diagrams, and the Construction of the Cosmos out of Right Triangles, Ancient Philosophy series, State University of New York Press, May 2017, paperback edition, January 2018.
- Materia Philosophiae: Material Dimensions of Ancient Greek Philosophy, co-edited by William Wians and Robert Hahn, Brill 2026, in the Euhormos series Anchoring innovations in Greco-Roman Studies.
