= Open-label trial =

Clinical trial where the treatment isn't hidden

An open-label trial, or open trial, is a type of clinical trial in which information is not withheld from trial participants. In particular, both the researchers and participants know which treatment is being administered. This contrasts with a double-blinded trial, where information is withheld both from the researchers and the participants to reduce bias.

Open-label trials may be appropriate for comparing two similar treatments to determine which is most effective, such as a comparison of different prescription anticoagulants, or possible relief from symptoms of some disorders when a placebo is given.

An open-label trial may still be randomized. Open-label trials may also be uncontrolled (without a placebo group), with all participants receiving the same treatment. This would be a single-arm study design.
