= Amplified placebo effect =

Phenomenon in psychology and medicine

The amplified placebo effect, also known as the enhanced placebo effect, is a phenomenon in psychology and medicine in which a person in a blinded clinical trial suspects that they have received the active drug due to functional unblinding and this results in the person experiencing amplified placebo effects. The unblinding resulting in the effect is caused by subtle psychoactive effects and side effects of the active drug. The amplified placebo effect is especially relevant and discussed in the context of psychiatric drug trials.

The amplified placebo effect was proposed and described by Kirsch and Moncrieff in the late 1990s. However, discussion of the phenomenon by other researchers goes back as early as at least the 1970s and 1980s.

== Placebo versus drug effect ==
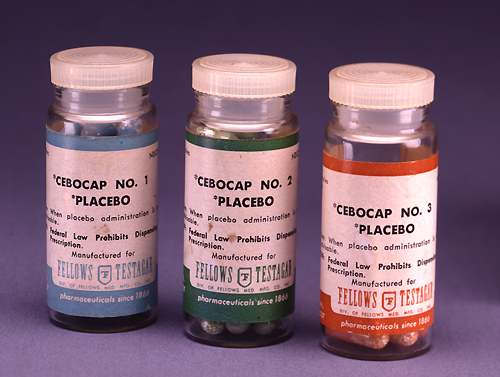
Placebos are normally inert tablets, such as sugar pills.

There are large placebo responses and effects in clinical trials of psychiatric drugs such as antidepressants and anxiolytics. For example, antidepressants typically improve depressive symptoms by about 10 points on a depression rating scale, whereas placebos improve symptoms by about 8 points on the scale, with about a 2-point advantage for antidepressant over placebo and at least 80% of the treatment benefit being fully attributable to the placebo response. Hence, most of the improvement in depressive symptoms with antidepressants is due to the placebo response, and the benefit potentially attributable to drug effects, though statistically significant, is modest, and in fact below accepted thresholds for clinical significance. These findings are based on comprehensive meta-analyses and have been repeatedly replicated over time.

The placebo response consists of the placebo effect (i.e., positive expectations) and of other components such as regression to the mean, spontaneous remission, and methodological bias, whereas the drug response is a combination of the drug effect and the placebo response, with the difference between the drug response and the placebo response typically assumed to represent the drug effect.

A person's belief about whether they are taking an active drug or placebo has been shown to have a substantial impact on their therapeutic outcome, with stronger positive expectations resulting in greater therapeutic improvement. For example, in a trial of escitalopram for social anxiety disorder, all patients were given the drug, but half were truthfully told that they were receiving the drug ("overt" group) and half were deceptively told that they were receiving an active placebo ("covert" group). The "overt" group experienced twice as much improvement in anxiety symptoms as the "covert" group in this trial (Cohen's d = 2.24 versus 1.13, respectively). In addition, this study design showed neurobiological differences between groups putatively underlying the differing therapeutic outcomes, such as differences in amygdala activity and the dopaminergic system. Relatedly, placebos are not inert, but produce real biological changes and associated therapeutic improvement.

== Unblinding ==
Due to unblinding caused by drug effects like subtle psychoactive effects and side effects, many patients and clinicians are able to correctly guess whether the patient received the active drug or placebo in antidepressant trials. In addition, better blinding integrity reduces differences in improvement between active drug and placebo, while blinding failure results in larger differences in improvement between active drug and placebo, although more research is needed in this area. Similarly, side effects have been found to be related to greater differences in improvement between active drug and placebo, though mixed findings exist as well. Along these lines, trials of antidepressants with active-placebo instead of inert-placebo control groups show substantially reduced drug advantage over placebo that is no longer statistically significant.

== Psychiatric drugs ==
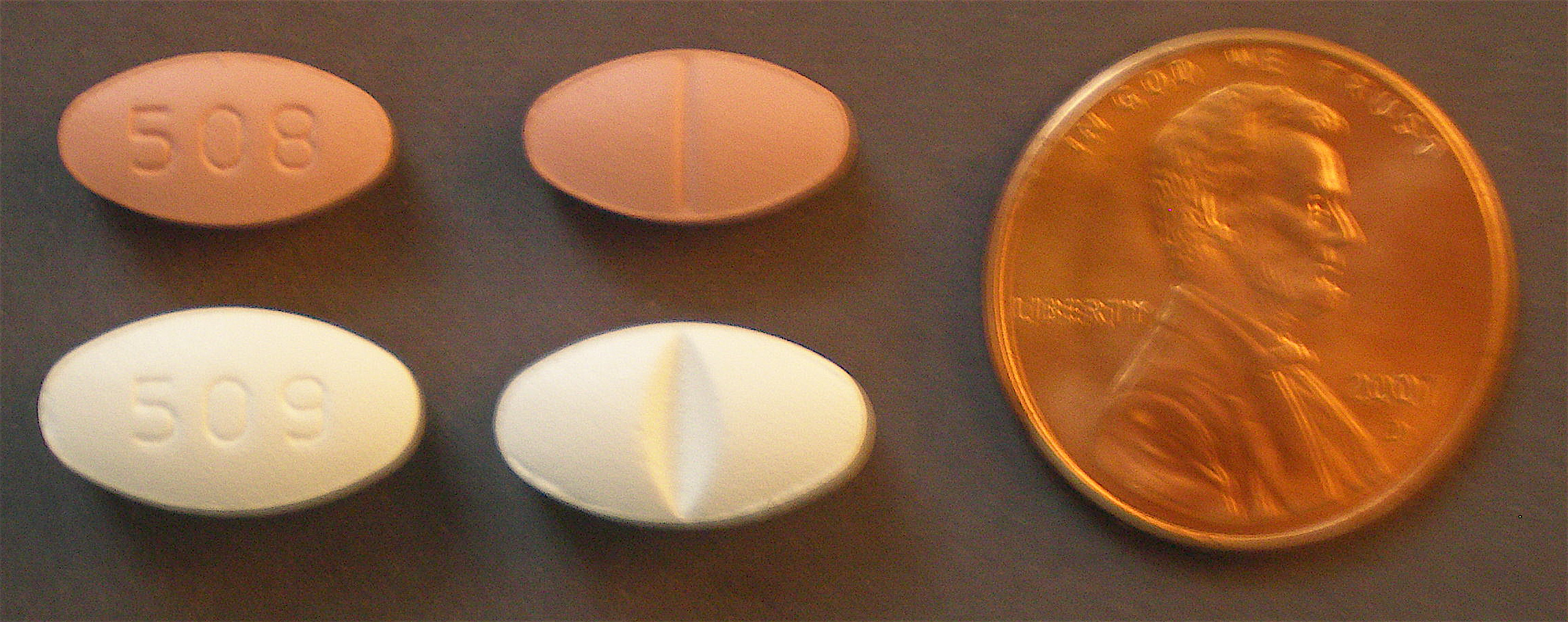
Citalopram tablets

It has been proposed and maintained by a group of academics, including Irving Kirsch, Joanna Moncrieff, and Michael P. Hengartner, that the amplified placebo effect can easily account for the small advantage of antidepressants over placebo in clinical trials, and hence that antidepressants exert their benefits in the treatment of depression entirely via placebo mechanisms rather than via drug effects. Put another way, antidepressants themselves could be said to effectively be "active placebos".

However, Moncrieff has proposed that antidepressants may also cause an emotional blunting phenomenon that can reduce both positive and negative affect and thereby be additionally useful in improving certain symptoms in some people. Regardless of whether antidepressants work entirely via placebo mechanisms or not, they do still appear to provide genuine therapeutic benefits with large effect sizes in people with depression or anxiety when the placebo response component of improvement is included.

It has been proposed that psychedelic drugs used for therapeutic purposes such as treatment of depression may act as active "super placebos" and may have greater therapeutic benefits than conventional antidepressants. However, due to issues like the inverse placebo effect caused by unblinding, psychedelics may actually be no more effective than traditional antidepressants. Owing to concerns about potential adverse effects and other problems, Moncrieff has critiqued use of psychedelics for treatment of psychiatric disorders.

== See also ==
- Antidepressant § Placebo mechanisms
- Inverse placebo effect
- Lessebo effect
