= Robert A. Burton =

American novelist

- Occupations: Novelist; nonfiction author; columnist; neurologist
- Writing career
- Genre: Mystery fiction / Thriller
- Subject: Neuroscience (non-fiction)
- Notable works: Doc-In-A-Box (1991); Final Therapy (1994); Cellmates (1997); On Being Certain (2008); A Skeptic's Guide to the Mind (2013)
- Website: www.rburton.com

Robert A. Burton is an American physician, novelist, nonfiction author and columnist. He has written four novels, as well as three nonfiction books, including On Being Certain: Believing You Are Right Even When You're Not and A Skeptic's Guide to the Mind: What Neuroscience Can and Cannot Tell Us About Ourselves. His essays have appeared in The New York Times, Salon, Aeon, and Nautilus Quarterly, among others.

His medical career includes being the chief of the Division of Neurology at Mt. Zion UCSF, and Associate Chief of the Department of Neurosciences.

Burton graduated from Yale University and the University of California, San Francisco medical school, where he also completed his neurology residency. He is a resident of the San Francisco Bay Area.

== Bibliography ==
=== Non-fiction ===
- On Being Certain. Believing You Are Right Even When You're Not. New York City: Macmillan Publishers/St. Martin's Press. 2008. ISBN 978-1-429-92611-9. (Macmillan Publishers edition); (St. Martin's Press edition).
- A Skeptic's Guide to the Mind. What Neuroscience Can and Cannot Tell Us About Ourselves. New York City: Macmillan Publishers. 2013. ISBN 978-12-5002-840-2.
- Key Issues in Health. Harcourt. 1978. ISBN 9780155483682. Written with Mitchell Thomas, Scott Thurber, and Barry S. Ramer.

=== Novels ===
- Doc-In-A-Box (1991)
- Final Therapy (1994)
- Cellmates (1997)
- The Cadmus Project: Innovation is Deadly (2014)
