= Lessebo effect =

The lessebo effect is a phenomenon in psychology and medicine in which a person in a blinded clinical trial knows that they might receive placebo due to the existence of a placebo control group in the trial and this results in the person experiencing diminished placebo effects (positive expectations) and therapeutic improvement. It has been described in several contexts including clinical trials of treatment for depression, schizophrenia, Parkinson's disease, and rheumatoid arthritis. The phenomenon was first named the "lessebo effect" by Mark Sinyor and colleagues in 2010. They showed in a meta-analysis that antidepressant and placebo response rates are influenced by the presence of a placebo arm and by the number of treatment arms (and thus likelihood of receiving placebo) in trials. A closely related but slightly distinct concept is the inverse placebo effect, which the lessebo effect has sometimes been inappropriately confused and conflated with.

== See also ==
- Inverse placebo effect
- Amplified placebo effect
