= Spontaneous remission =

Diminution or abatement of a disease over time, without formal treatment

Spontaneous remission, also called spontaneous healing or spontaneous regression, is an unexpected improvement or cure from a disease that usually progresses. These terms are commonly used for unexpected transient or final improvements in cancer. Spontaneous remissions concern cancers of the haematopoietic system (blood cancer, e.g., leukemia), while spontaneous regressions concern palpable tumors; however, both terms are often used interchangeably.

== Definition ==
The spontaneous regression and remission from cancer was defined by Everson and Cole in their 1966 book as "the partial or complete disappearance of a malignant tumour in the absence of all treatment, or in the presence of therapy which is considered inadequate to exert significant influence on neoplastic disease."

== Frequency of spontaneous regression in cancer ==
It has long been assumed that spontaneous regressions, let alone cures, from cancer are rare phenomena, and that some forms of cancer are more prone to unexpected courses (melanoma, neuroblastoma, lymphoma) than others (carcinoma). Frequency was estimated to be about 1 in 100,000 cancers; however, this proportion might be an under- or an overestimate. For one, not all cases of spontaneous regression can be apprehended, either because the case was not well documented or the physician was not willing to publish, or simply because the patient ceased to attend a clinic any more. On the other hand, for the past 100 years almost all cancer patients have received some form of treatment, and the influence of that treatment cannot always be excluded.

It is likely that the frequency of spontaneous regression in small tumors has been drastically underrated. In a carefully designed study on mammography it was found that 22% of all breast cancer cases underwent spontaneous regression.

== Causes ==
Everson and Cole offered as explanation for spontaneous regression from cancer:

In many of the collected cases [...] it must be acknowledged that the factors or mechanisms responsible for spontaneous regression are obscure or unknown in the light of present knowledge. However, in some of the cases, available knowledge permits one to infer that hormonal influences probably were important. [...] In other cases, the protocols strongly suggest that an immune mechanism was responsible.

Challis and Stam, even more at a loss, concluded in 1989, "In summary, we are left to conclude that, although a great number of interesting and unusual cases continue to be published annually, there is still little conclusive data that explains the occurrence of spontaneous regression."

Apoptosis (programmed cell death) and angiogenesis (growth of new blood vessels) are sometimes discussed as possible causes of spontaneous regression. But both mechanisms need appropriate biochemical triggers and cannot initiate on their own. Indeed, in many cancer cells apoptosis is defective, and angiogenesis is activated, both of these effects being caused by mutations in cancer cells; cancer exists because both mechanisms are malfunctioning.

There are several case reports of spontaneous regressions from cancer occurring after a fever brought on by infection, suggesting a possible causal connection. If this coincidence in time would be a causal connection, it should as well precipitate as prophylactic effect, i.e. feverish infections should lower the risk to develop cancer later. This could be confirmed by collecting epidemiological studies.

== Reviews ==
- Rohdenburg (1918) summarized 185 spontaneous regressions
- Fauvet reported 202 cases between 1960 and 1964
- Boyd reported 98 cases in 1966
- Everson and Cole described 176 cases between 1900 and 1960
- Challis summarized 741 cases between 1900 and 1987
- O'Regan Brendan, Carlyle Hirschberg collected over 3,500 references from the medical literature
- Hobohm, in a meta-analysis, investigated about 1000 cases
- Turner, in a qualitative research study, conducted interviews with 20 patients with spontaneous remissions
- Surviving Against All Odds - re sole survivor in "a gamma interferon study"
