= Irving Kirsch =

Medical researcher

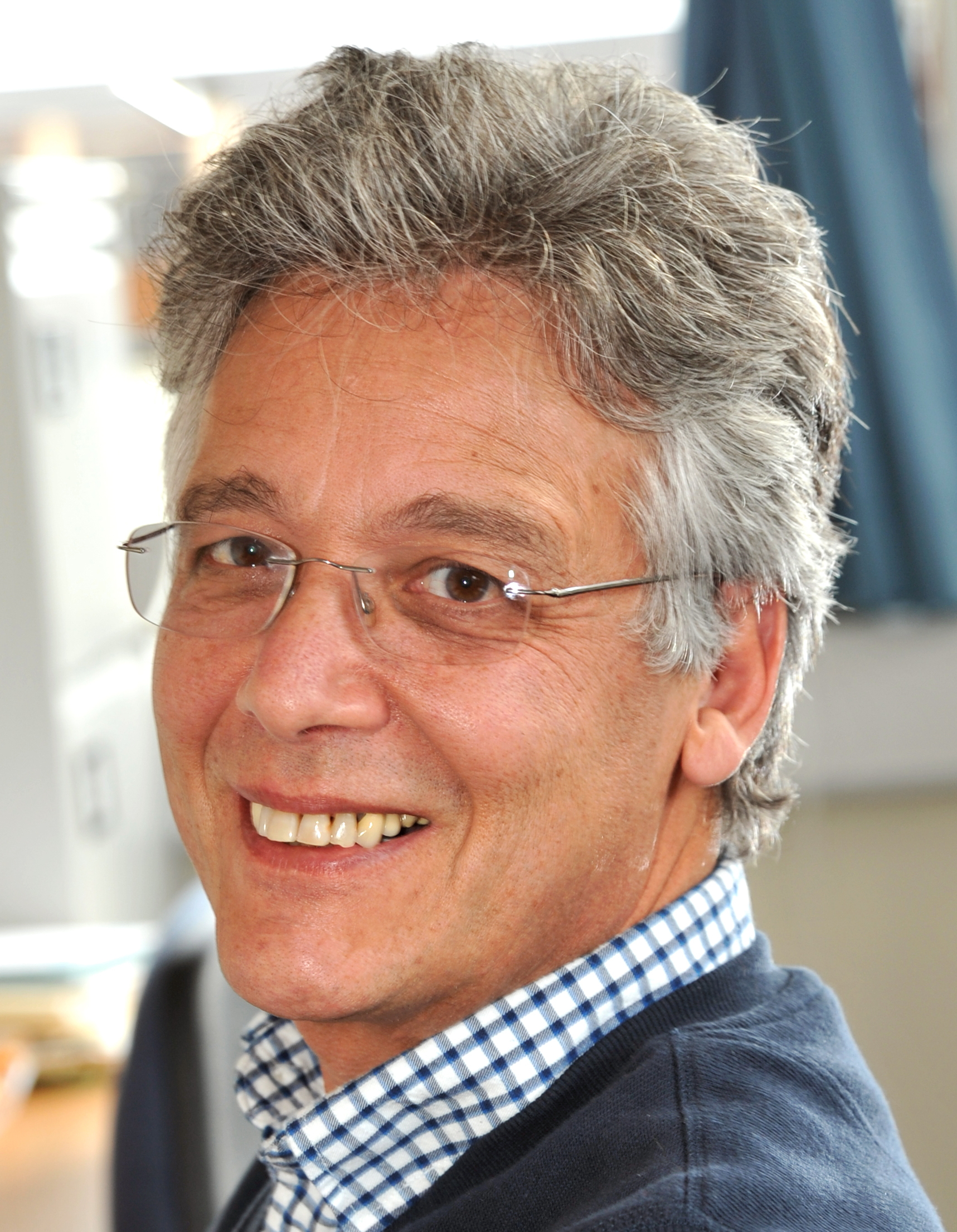
- Born: March 7, 1943 (age 83)
- Known for: Placebo research
- Scientific career
- Fields: Psychiatry

Irving Kirsch (born March 7, 1943) is an American psychologist and academic. He is the Associate Director of the Program in Placebo Studies and a lecturer in medicine at the Harvard Medical School and Beth Israel Deaconess Medical Center. He is also professor emeritus of psychology at the Universities of Hull and Plymouth in the United Kingdom, and the University of Connecticut in the United States. Kirsch is a leading researcher within the field of placebo studies who is noted for his work on placebo effects, antidepressants, expectancy, and hypnosis. He is the originator of response expectancy theory, and his analyses of clinical trials of antidepressants have influenced official treatment guidelines in the United Kingdom. He is the author of the 2009 book The Emperor's New Drugs, which argued most antidepressant medication is effective primarily due to placebo effects.

== Biography ==
The son of Jewish immigrants from Poland and Russia, Kirsch was born in New York City on March 7, 1943. Kirsch received his PhD in psychology from the University of Southern California in 1975. While a graduate student, he produced, in conjunction with the National Lampoon, a hit single and subsequent record album entitled The Missing White House Tapes, which were crafted by doctoring tape recordings of Richard Nixon’s speeches and press conferences during the Watergate hearings. The album was nominated for a Grammy award as Best Comedy Recording in 1974.

In 1975, Kirsch joined the psychology department at the University of Connecticut, where he worked until 2004, when he became a professor of psychology at the University of Plymouth. He moved to the University of Hull in 2007 and joined the faculty of the Harvard Medical School in 2011. Kirsch has authored or edited 10 books and more than 200 scientific journal articles and book chapters.

== Theories and research ==
=== Response expectancy theory ===
Kirsch’s response expectancy theory is based on the idea that what people experience depends partly on what they expect to experience. According to Kirsch, this is the process that lies behind the placebo effect and hypnosis. The theory is supported by research showing that both subjective and physiological responses can be altered by changing people’s expectancies. The theory has been applied to understanding pain, depression, anxiety disorders, asthma, addictions, and psychogenic illnesses.

=== Research on antidepressants ===
Kirsch’s analysis of the effectiveness of antidepressants was an outgrowth of his interest in the placebo effect. His first meta-analysis was aimed at assessing the size of the placebo effect in the treatment of depression. The results not only showed a sizeable placebo effect, but also indicated that the drug effect was surprisingly small. This led Kirsch to shift his interest to evaluating the antidepressant drug effect.

The controversy surrounding this analysis led Kirsch to obtain files from the U.S. Food and Drug Administration (FDA) containing data from trials that had not been published, as well as those data from published trials. Analyses of the FDA data showed the average size effect of antidepressant drugs to be equal to 0.32, clinically insignificant according to the National Institute for Health and Clinical Excellence (NICE) 2004 guidelines, requiring Cohen's d to be no less than 0.50. No evidence was cited to support this cut-off and it was criticised for being arbitrary; NICE removed the specification of criteria for clinical relevance in its 2009 guidelines.

Kirsch challenges the chemical-imbalance theory of depression, writing "It now seems beyond question that the traditional account of depression as a chemical imbalance in the brain is simply wrong." In 2014, in the British Psychological Society's Research Digest, Christian Jarrett included Kirsch's 2008 antidepressant placebo effect study in a list of the 10 most controversial psychology studies ever published.

In September 2019 Irving Kirsch published a review in BMJ Evidence-Based Medicine, which concluded that antidepressants are of little benefit in most people with depression and thus they should not be used until evidence shows their benefit is greater than their risks.

=== Research on hypnosis ===
Kirsch has also done research on hypnosis. He believes that placebo effects and hypnosis share a common mechanism: response expectancy. In his view, the effects of both hypnosis and placebos result from the beliefs of the participant. He has characterized clinical hypnosis as a "nondeceptive placebo."

== See also ==
- David Healy
- John Ioannidis
- Amplified placebo effect

== Selected bibliography ==
- Hall, K. T.; Lembo, A. J.; Kirsch I.; Ziogas, D. C.; Douaiher, J. & Jensen, K. B. (October 2012). "Genetic variation at the coronary artery disease risk locus GUCY1A3 modifies cardiovascular disease prevention effects of aspirin". PLOS Medicine. 7 (10): e45. doi:10.1371/journal.pone.0048135. PMC 3479140. PMID 23110189.
- Kirsch, I (2009). The Emperor's New Drugs: Exploding the Antidepressant Myth. London: The Bodley Head. ISBN 978-1-84792-083-6.
- Kirsch, I.; Deacon, B. J.; Huedo-Medina, T. B.; Scoboria, A.; Moore, T. J. & Johnson, B. T (February 2008). "Initial severity and antidepressant benefits: A meta-analysis of data submitted to the Food and Drug Administration". PLOS Medicine. 5 (2): e45. doi:10.1371/journal.pmed.0050045. PMC 2253608. PMID 18303940.
- Kirsch, I. & Moncrieff, J (July 2007). "Clinical trials and the response rate illusion". Contemporary Clinical Trials. 28 (4): 348–51. doi:10.1016/j.cct.2006.10.012. PMID 17182286.
- Lynn, S. J. & Kirsch, I (2005). Essentials of Clinical Hypnosis: An Evidence-based Approach. Washington, DC: American Psychological Association (APA). ISBN 1-59147-344-6.
- Kirsch, I.; Moore, T. J.; Scoboria, A. & Nicholls, S. S (July 2002). "The emperor's new drugs: An analysis of antidepressant medication data" (PDF). Prevention and Treatment. 5 23. doi:10.1037/1522-3736.5.1.523a. Archived from the original (PDF) on 2012-12-24.
- Kirsch, I. & Braffman, W (2001). "Imaginative Suggestibility and Hypnotizability". Current Directions in Psychological Science. 10 (2): 57–61. doi:10.1111/1467-8721.00115. S2CID 145383389.
- Kirsch, I. & Lynn, S. J (July 1999). "Automaticity in clinical psychology". American Psychologist. 54 (7): 504–15. doi:10.1037/0003-066x.54.7.504. PMID 10424156.
- Kirsch, I., ed. (1999). How expectancies shape experience. Washington DC: American Psychological Association. ISBN 1-55798-586-3.
- Kirsch, I. & Sapirstein, G (1998-06-26). "Listening to Prozac but hearing placebo: A meta-analysis of antidepressant medication". Prevention and Treatment. 1 (2): Article 0002a. doi:10.1037/1522-3736.1.1.12a. Archived from the original on 1998-07-15.
- Kirsch, I. & Lynn, S. J (January 1998). "Dissociation theories of hypnosis". Psychological Bulletin. 123 (1): 100–15. doi:10.1037/0033-2909.123.1.100. PMID 9461855.
- Kirsch, I. & Lynn, S. J (1998). "Social-cognitive alternatives to dissociation theories of hypnotic involuntariness". Review of General Psychology. 2 (1): 66–80. doi:10.1037/1089-2680.2.1.66. S2CID 210783110.
- Montgomery, G. H. & Kirsch, I (1996). "Mechanisms of placebo pain reductio: An Empirical Investigation". Psychological Science. 7 (3): 174–176. doi:10.1111/j.1467-9280.1996.tb00352.x. S2CID 73165388.
- Kirsch, I. & Lynn, S. J (1995). "Altered state of hypnosis: Changes in the theoretical landscape". American Psychologist. 50 (10): 846–858. doi:10.1037/0003-066X.50.10.846.
- Kirsch, I (1990). Changing expectations : A key to effective psychotherapy. Pacific Grove, CA: Brooks/Cole. ISBN 0-534-12648-0.
- Kirsch, I (1985). "Response expectancy as a determinant of experience and behavior". American Psychologist. 40 (11): 1189–1202. doi:10.1037/0003-066X.40.11.1189.
