= Blinded experiment =

Experiment in which information about the test is masked to reduce bias

In a blind or blinded experiment, information that could influence participants or investigators is withheld until the experiment is completed. Blinding is used to reduce or eliminate potential sources of bias, such as participants’ expectations, the observer-expectancy effect, observer bias, confirmation bias, and other cognitive or procedural influences.

Blinding can be applied to different participants in an experiment, including study subjects, researchers, technicians, data analysts, and outcome assessors. When multiple groups are blinded simultaneously (for example, both participants and researchers), the design is referred to as a double-blind study.

In some cases, blinding is desirable but impractical or unethical. For example, it is not possible to blind a participant receiving a physical therapy intervention, or a surgeon performing an operative procedure. Well-designed clinical protocols therefore aim to maximize the effectiveness of blinding within ethical and practical constraints.

During the course of an experiment, a participant becomes unblinded if they deduce or otherwise obtain information that has been masked to them. For example, a patient who experiences a side effect may correctly guess their treatment, becoming unblinded. Unblinding is common in blinded experiments, particularly in pharmacological trials. In particular, trials on pain medication and antidepressants are poorly blinded. Unblinding that occurs before the conclusion of a study is a source of experimental error, as the bias that was eliminated by blinding is re-introduced. The CONSORT reporting guidelines recommend that all studies assess and report unblinding. In practice, very few studies do so.

Blinding is an important tool of the scientific method, and is used in many fields of research. In some fields, such as medicine, it is considered essential. In clinical research, a trial that is not blinded is called an open trial.

== History ==
The first known blind experiment was conducted by the French Royal Commission on Animal Magnetism in 1784 to investigate the claims of mesmerism as proposed by Charles d'Eslon, a former associate of Franz Mesmer. In the investigations, the researchers (physically) blindfolded mesmerists and asked them to identify objects that the experimenters had previously filled with "vital fluid". The subjects were unable to do so.

In 1817, the first recorded blind experiment conducted outside a scientific setting compared the musical quality of a Stradivarius violin with that of a guitar-like violin. A violinist played each instrument while a committee of scientists and musicians listened from another room to avoid prejudice.

An early example of a double-blind protocol was the Nuremberg salt test of 1835 performed by Friedrich Wilhelm von Hoven, Nuremberg's highest-ranking public health official, as well as a close friend of Friedrich Schiller. This trial contested the effectiveness of homeopathic dilution.

In 1865, Claude Bernard published his Introduction to the Study of Experimental Medicine, which advocated blinding researchers. Bernard's recommendation that an experiment's observer should not know the hypothesis being tested contrasted starkly with the prevalent Enlightenment-era attitude that scientific observation can only be objectively valid when undertaken by a well-educated, informed scientist. The first study recorded to have a blinded researcher was conducted in 1907 by W. H. R. Rivers and H. N. Webber to investigate the effects of caffeine. The need to blind researchers became widely recognized in the mid-20th century.

== Background ==
=== Bias ===
Several biases arise when a study is insufficiently blinded. Patient-reported outcomes may differ when patients are not blinded to their treatment. Likewise, failure to blind researchers results in observer bias. Unblinded data analysts may favor an analysis that supports their existing beliefs (confirmation bias). These biases are typically the result of subconscious influences, and are present even when study participants believe they do not influence them.

=== Terminology ===
In medical research, the terms single-blind, double-blind and triple-blind are commonly used to describe blinding. These terms describe experiments in which (respectively) one, two, or three parties are blinded to some information. Most often, single-blind studies blind patients to their treatment allocation, double-blind studies blind both patients and researchers to treatment allocations, and triple-blinded studies blind patients, researcher, and some other third party (such as a monitoring committee) to treatment allocations. However, the meaning of these terms can vary across studies.

CONSORT guidelines state that these terms should no longer be used because they are ambiguous. For instance, "double-blind" may mean that the data analysts and patients were blinded; the patients and outcome assessors were blinded; or the patients and those administering the intervention were blinded. The terms also fail to convey the information that was masked and the extent of unblinding. It is not sufficient to specify the number of parties that have been blinded. To describe an experiment's blinding, it is necessary to report who has been blinded to what information, and how well each blind succeeded.

== Unblinding ==
"Unblinding" occurs in a blinded experiment when information is revealed to someone to whom it has been masked. In clinical studies, unblinding may occur unintentionally when a patient deduces their treatment group. Unblinding that occurs before the conclusion of an experiment is a source of bias. Some degree of premature unblinding is common in blinded experiments. When a blind is imperfect, its success is judged on a spectrum with no blind (or complete failure of blinding) on one end, perfect blinding on the other, and poor or good blinding between. Thus, the common view of studies as blinded or unblinded exemplifies a false dichotomy.

The success of blinding is assessed by asking study participants about information that has been masked from them (e.g., whether the participant received the drug or placebo?). In a perfectly blinded experiment, the responses should be consistent with no knowledge of the masked information. However, if unblinding has occurred, the responses will indicate the degree of unblinding. Since unblinding cannot be measured directly, but must be inferred from participants' responses, its measured value will depend on the nature of the questions asked. As a result, it is not possible to objectively measure unblinding. Nonetheless, it is still possible to make informed judgments about the quality of a blinding. Poorly blinded studies rank above unblinded studies and below well-blinded studies in the hierarchy of evidence.

=== Post-study unblinding ===
Post-study unblinding is the release of masked data upon completion of a study. In clinical studies, post-study unblinding informs subjects of their treatment allocation. Removing a blind upon completion of a study is never mandatory, but is typically performed as a courtesy to study participants. Unblinding that occurs after the conclusion of a study is not a source of bias, because data collection and analysis are both complete at this time.

=== Premature unblinding ===
Premature unblinding is any unblinding that occurs before the conclusion of a study. In contrast with post-study unblinding, premature unblinding is a source of bias. A code-break procedure dictates when a subject should be unblinded prematurely. A code-break procedure should allow unblinding only in cases of emergency. Unblinding that occurs in compliance with the code-break procedure is strictly documented and reported.

Premature unblinding may also occur when a participant infers, from the experimental conditions, information that has been masked from him. A common cause for unblinding is the presence of side effects (or effects) in the treatment group. In pharmacological trials, premature unblinding can be reduced with the use of an active placebo, which conceals treatment allocation by ensuring the presence of side effects in both groups. However, side effects are not the only cause of unblinding; any perceptible difference between the treatment and control groups can contribute to premature unblinding.

A problem arises in assessing blinding because asking subjects to guess masked information may prompt them to infer it. Researchers speculate that this may contribute to premature unblinding. Furthermore, it has been reported that some subjects of clinical trials attempt to determine if they have received an active treatment by gathering information on social media and message boards. While researchers counsel patients not to use social media to discuss clinical trials, their accounts are not monitored. This behavior is believed to be a source of unblinding. CONSORT standards and good clinical practice guidelines recommend the reporting of all premature unblinding. In practice, unintentional unblinding is rarely reported.

=== Significance ===
Bias due to poor blinding tends to favor the experimental group, resulting in inflated effect size and risk of false positives. Success or failure of blinding is rarely reported or measured; it is implicitly assumed that experiments reported as "blind" are truly blind. Critics have pointed out that without assessment and reporting, there is no way to know if blinding succeeded. This shortcoming is especially concerning given that even a small error in blinding can produce a statistically significant result in the absence of any real difference between test groups when a study is sufficiently powered (i.e. statistical significance is not robust to bias). As such, many statistically significant results in randomized controlled trials may be caused by error in blinding. Some researchers have called for the mandatory assessment of blinding efficacy in clinical trials.

== Applications ==
=== In medicine ===
Blinding is considered essential in medicine, but is often difficult to achieve. For example, it is difficult to compare surgical and non-surgical interventions in blind trials. In some cases, sham surgery may be necessary to blind the study. A good clinical protocol ensures that blinding is as adequate as possible within ethical and practical constraints.

Studies of blinded pharmacological trials across diverse domains report high rates of unblinding. Unblinding has been shown to affect both patients and clinicians. This evidence challenges the common assumption that blinding is highly effective in pharmacological trials. Unblinding has also been documented in clinical trials outside of pharmacology.

==== Pain ====
A 2018 meta-analysis found that assessment of blinding was reported in only 23 out of 408 randomized controlled trials for chronic pain (5.6%). The study concluded, based on an analysis of pooled data, that the overall quality of blinding was poor and that blinding was "not successful." Additionally, both pharmaceutical sponsorship and the presence of side effects were associated with lower rates of reporting assessment of blinding.

==== Depression ====
Studies have found evidence of extensive unblinding in antidepressant trials: at least three-quarters of patients were able to guess their treatment assignment correctly. Unblinding also occurs in clinicians. Better blinding of patients and clinicians reduces effect size. Researchers concluded that unblinding inflates the effect size in antidepressant trials. Some researchers believe that antidepressants are not effective for the treatment of depression and only outperform placebos due to systematic error. These researchers argue that antidepressants are just active placebos.

==== Acupuncture ====
While the possibility of blinded trials on acupuncture is controversial, a 2003 review of 47 randomized controlled trials found no fewer than four methods of blinding patients to acupuncture treatment: 1) superficial needling of true acupuncture points, 2) use of acupuncture points which are not indicated for the condition being treated, 3) insertion of needles outside of true acupuncture points, and 4) the use of placebo needles which are designed not to penetrate the skin. The authors concluded that there was "no clear association between the type of sham intervention used and the results of the trials."

A 2018 study on acupuncture, which used needles that did not penetrate the skin as a sham treatment, found that 68% of patients and 83% of acupuncturists correctly identified their group allocation. The authors concluded that blinding had failed, but that more advanced placebos may someday enable well-blinded studies in acupuncture.

=== In physics ===
It is standard practice in physics to perform blinded data analysis. Once the data analysis is complete, one may unblind the data. A prior agreement to publish the data regardless of the results of the study may be made to prevent publication bias.

=== In social sciences ===
Social science research is particularly prone to observer bias, so it is essential in these fields to properly blind the researchers. In some cases, while blind experiments would be helpful, they are impractical or unethical. Blinded data analysis can reduce bias, but is rarely used in social science research.

=== In forensics ===
In a police photo lineup, an officer shows a group of photos to a witness and asks the witness to identify the individual who committed the crime. Since the officer is typically aware of who the suspect is, they may (subconsciously or consciously) influence the witness to choose the individual that they believe committed the crime. There is a growing movement in law enforcement toward a blind procedure in which the officer who shows the photos to the witness does not know the suspect's identity.

=== In music ===
Auditions for symphony orchestras take place behind a curtain so that the judges cannot see the performer. Blinding the judges to the gender of the performers has been shown to increase the hiring of women. Blind tests can also be used to compare the quality of musical instruments.

== See also ==
- Allocation concealment
- Amplified placebo effect
- Black boxing
- Blind taste test
- Inverse placebo effect
- Jadad scale
- Lessebo effect
- Observational study
- Metascience
- Royal Commission on Animal Magnetism
- Scientific control
