= Daniel Carlat =

American psychiatrist

- Education: University of California, Berkeley; University of California, San Francisco
- Occupations: CEO, Psychiatrist

Daniel Carlat is an American psychiatrist known for his critical stance towards pharmaceutical prescription practices and corporate sponsorship of continuing medical education (CME). He is the CEO of Carlat Publishing, which sells newsletters and other materials used for CME.

== Background ==
Currently, Carlat is a faculty member at Tufts Medical School and serves as the editor of The Carlat Psychiatry Report, a monthly newsletter. In 2007, he wrote a New York Times Magazine article entitled "Dr. Drug Rep" about how he was recruited by the pharmaceutical company Wyeth to promote the antidepressant Effexor as being more effective than other antidepressants on the market. According to Carlat, he began to doubt the quality of the data that supported the drug he was paid to promote, pointing towards the short-term nature of the studies cited by the company, along with concerns raised about withdrawal symptoms. He eventually chose to quit giving talks on behalf of drug companies entirely after being questioned by a Wyeth district manager about his "enthusiasm" for the product. In another 2007 article in The Boston Globe, he criticized Massachusetts General Hospital for accepting millions of dollars from drug companies that sponsored continuing medical education courses in psychiatry.

Carlat has also criticized the quality of psychiatric pathophysiology by comparing his field to cardiology, which he argues has a better understanding of how to treat problems using medication. He cites problems such as an inability to directly measure neurotransmitter levels in living patients and a reliance on indirect testing methods (e.g., measuring serotonin based on cerebrospinal fluid samples or during post-mortem studies).
