= Placebo =

Substance or treatment of no therapeutic value

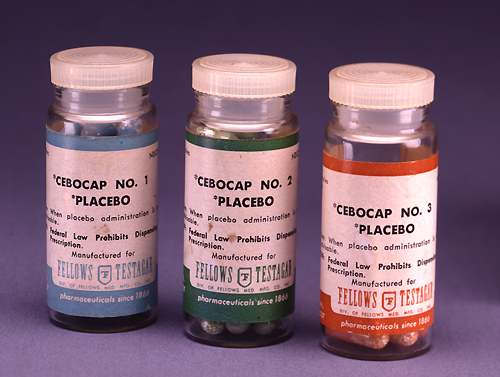
Placebos are typically inert tablets, such as sugar pills.

A placebo (/pləˈsiːboʊ/ pluh-SEE-boh) is a medicine or treatment intended to appear genuine to its recipient, but which has no pharmaceutical effect. Common placebos include inert tablets (like sugar pills), inert injections (like saline), sham surgery, and other procedures.

Placebos are used in randomized clinical trials to test the efficacy of medical treatments. In a placebo-controlled trial, any change in the control group is known as the placebo response, and the difference between this and the result of no treatment is the placebo effect. Placebos in clinical trials should ideally be indistinguishable from so-called verum treatments under investigation, except for the latter's particular hypothesized medicinal effect. This is to shield test participants (with their consent) from knowing who is getting the placebo and who is getting the treatment under test, as patients' and clinicians' expectations of efficacy can influence results.

The idea of a "placebo effect" was discussed in 18th century psychology, but became more prominent in the 20th century. Modern studies find that placebos can affect some outcomes such as pain and nausea, but otherwise do not generally have important clinical effects. Improvements that patients experience after being treated with a placebo can also be due to unrelated factors, such as regression to the mean (a statistical effect where an unusually high or low measurement is likely to be followed by a less extreme one). The use of placebos in clinical medicine raises ethical concerns, especially if they are disguised as an active treatment, as this introduces dishonesty into the doctor–patient relationship and bypasses informed consent.

Placebos are also popular because they can sometimes produce relief through psychological mechanisms (a phenomenon known as the "placebo effect"). They can affect how patients perceive their condition and encourage the body's chemical processes for relieving pain and a few other symptoms, but have no impact on the disease itself.

== Etymology and definition ==
The Latin term placebo means [I] shall be pleasing.

The definition of placebo has been debated. One definition states that a treatment process is a placebo when none of the characteristic treatment factors are effective (remedial or harmful) in the patient for a given disease.

In a clinical trial, a placebo response is the measured response of subjects to a placebo; the placebo effect is the difference between that response and no treatment. The placebo response may include improvements due to natural healing, declines due to natural disease progression, the tendency for people who were temporarily feeling either better or worse than usual to return to their average situations (regression toward the mean), and errors in the clinical trial records, which can make it appear that a change has happened when nothing has changed. It is also part of the recorded response to any active medical intervention.

Measurable placebo effects may be either objective (e.g. lowered blood pressure) or subjective (e.g. a lowered perception of pain).

== Effects ==
The placebo effect is a well-documented phenomenon, though it remains widely misunderstood and surrounded by misconceptions. Several studies have questioned its clinical relevance, fueling ongoing debate about its actual effectiveness. A 2001 meta-analysis of the placebo effect looked at trials in 40 different medical conditions, and concluded the only one where it had been shown to have a significant effect was for pain. Another Cochrane review in 2010 suggested that placebo effects are apparent only in subjective, continuous measures, and in the treatment of pain and related conditions. The review found that placebos do not appear to affect the actual diseases, or outcomes that are not dependent on a patient's perception. The authors, Asbjørn Hróbjartsson and Peter C. Gøtzsche, concluded that their study "did not find that placebo interventions have important clinical effects in general." This interpretation has been subject to criticism, particularly due to concerns about the adequacy of the methodology used. Recent research has linked placebo interventions to improved motor functions in patients with Parkinson's disease. Other objective outcomes affected by placebos include immune and endocrine parameters, end-organ functions regulated by the autonomic nervous system,, sport performance, and cognitive performance.

Measuring the extent of the placebo effect is difficult due to confounding factors. For example, a patient may feel better after taking a placebo due to regression to the mean (i.e. a natural recovery or change in symptoms), but this can be ruled out by comparing the placebo group with a no treatment group (as all the placebo research does). It is harder still to tell the difference between the placebo effect and the effects of response bias, observer bias and other flaws in trial methodology, as a trial comparing placebo treatment and no treatment will not be a blinded experiment. In their 2010 meta-analysis of the placebo effect, Asbjørn Hróbjartsson and Peter C. Gøtzsche argue that "even if there were no true effect of placebo, one would expect to record differences between placebo and no-treatment groups due to bias associated with lack of blinding."

One way in which the magnitude of placebo analgesia can be measured is by conducting "open/hidden" studies, in which some patients receive an analgesic and are informed that they will be receiving it (open), while others are administered the same drug without their knowledge (hidden). Such studies have found that analgesics are considerably more effective when the patient knows they are receiving them.

=== Factors influencing the power of the placebo effect ===
A review published in JAMA Psychiatry found that, in trials of antipsychotic medications, the change in response to receiving a placebo had increased significantly between 1960 and 2013. The review's authors identified several factors that could be responsible for this change, including inflation of baseline scores and enrollment of fewer severely ill patients. Another analysis published in Pain in 2015 found that placebo responses had increased considerably in neuropathic pain clinical trials conducted in the United States from 1990 to 2013. The researchers suggested that this may be because such trials have "increased in study size and length" during this time period.

Individual differences in personality traits may influence susceptibility to placebo and nocebo (negative placebo) effects. People with a more optimistic outlook tend to exhibit stronger placebo responses, while those with higher levels of anxiety are more likely to experience nocebo effects.

The administration of the placebos can determine the placebo effect strength. Studies have found that taking more pills would strengthen the effect. Capsules appear to be more influential than pills, and injections are even stronger than capsules.

Some studies have investigated the use of placebos where the patient is fully aware that the treatment is inert, known as an open-label placebo. Clinical trials found that open-label placebos may have positive effects in comparison to no treatment, which may open new avenues for treatments, but a review of such trials noted that they were done with a small number of participants and hence should be interpreted with "caution" until further, better-controlled trials are conducted. An updated 2021 systematic review and meta-analysis based on 11 studies also found a significant, albeit slightly smaller overall effect of open-label placebos, while noting that "research on OLPs is still in its infancy."

If the person dispensing the placebo shows their care towards the patient, is friendly and sympathetic, or has a high expectation of a treatment's success, then the placebo is more effectual.

=== Depression ===
In 2008, a meta-analysis led by psychologist Irving Kirsch, analyzing data from the Food and Drug Administration (FDA), concluded that 82% of the response to antidepressants was accounted for by placebos. However, other authors expressed doubts about the used methods and the interpretation of the results, especially the use of 0.5 as the cut-off point for the effect size. A complete reanalysis and recalculation based on the same FDA data found that the Kirsch study had "important flaws in the calculations." The authors concluded that although a large percentage of the placebo response was due to expectancy, this was not true for the active drug. Besides confirming drug effectiveness, they found that the drug effect was not related to depression severity.

Another meta-analysis found that 79% of depressed patients receiving placebo remained well (for 12 weeks after an initial 6–8 weeks of successful therapy) compared to 93% of those receiving antidepressants. In the continuation phase however, patients on placebo relapsed significantly more often than patients on antidepressants.

=== Negative effects ===
A phenomenon opposite to the placebo effect has also been observed. When an inactive substance or treatment is administered to a recipient who has an expectation of it having a negative impact, this intervention is known as a nocebo (Latin nocebo = "I shall harm"). A nocebo effect occurs when the recipient of an inert substance reports a negative effect or a worsening of symptoms, with the outcome resulting not from the substance itself, but from negative expectations about the treatment.

Another negative consequence is that placebos can cause side-effects associated with real treatment.

Withdrawal symptoms can also occur after placebo treatment. This was found, for example, after the discontinuation of the Women's Health Initiative study of hormone replacement therapy for menopause. Women had been on placebo for an average of 5.7 years. Moderate or severe withdrawal symptoms were reported by 4.8% of those on placebo compared to 21.3% of those on hormone replacement.

== Ethics ==
=== In research trials ===
Knowingly giving a person a placebo when there is an effective treatment available is a bioethically complex issue. While placebo-controlled trials might provide information about the effectiveness of a treatment, it denies some patients what could be the best available (if unproven) treatment. Informed consent is usually required for a study to be considered ethical, including the disclosure that some test subjects will receive placebo treatments.

The ethics of placebo-controlled studies have been debated in the revision process of the Declaration of Helsinki. Of particular concern has been the difference between trials comparing inert placebos with experimental treatments, versus comparing the best available treatment with an experimental treatment; and differences between trials in the sponsor's developed countries versus the trial's targeted developing countries.

Some suggest that existing medical treatments should be used instead of placebos, to avoid having some patients not receive medicine during the trial.

=== In medical practice ===
The practice of doctors prescribing placebos that are disguised as real medication is controversial. A chief concern is that it is deceptive and could harm the doctor–patient relationship in the long run. While some say that blanket consent, or the general consent to unspecified treatment given by patients beforehand, is ethical, others argue that patients should always obtain specific information about the name of the drug they are receiving, its side effects, and other treatment options. This view is shared by some on the grounds of patient autonomy. There are also concerns that legitimate doctors and pharmacists could open themselves up to charges of fraud or malpractice by using a placebo. Critics also argued that using placebos can delay the proper diagnosis and treatment of serious medical conditions.

Despite the abovementioned issues, 60% of surveyed physicians and head nurses reported using placebos in an Israeli study, with only 5% of respondents stating that placebo use should be strictly prohibited. A British Medical Journal editorial said, "that a patient gets pain relief from a placebo does not imply that the pain is not real or organic in origin ...the use of the placebo for 'diagnosis' of whether or not pain is real is misguided." A survey in the United States of more than 10,000 physicians came to the result that while 24% of physicians would prescribe a treatment that is a placebo simply because the patient wanted treatment, 58% would not, and for the remaining 18%, it would depend on the circumstances.

Referring specifically to homeopathy, the House of Commons of the United Kingdom Science and Technology Committee has stated:

In the Committee's view, homeopathy is a placebo treatment and the Government should have a policy on prescribing placebos. The Government is reluctant to address the appropriateness and ethics of prescribing placebos to patients, which usually relies on some degree of patient deception. Prescribing of placebos is not consistent with informed patient choice—which the Government claims is very important—as it means patients do not have all the information needed to make choice meaningful. A further issue is that the placebo effect is unreliable and unpredictable.

In his 2008 book Bad Science, Ben Goldacre argues that instead of deceiving patients with placebos, doctors should use the placebo effect to enhance effective medicines. Edzard Ernst has argued similarly that "As a good doctor you should be able to transmit a placebo effect through the compassion you show your patients." In an opinion piece about homeopathy, Ernst argues that it is wrong to support alternative medicine on the basis that it can make patients feel better through the placebo effect. His concerns are that it is deceitful and that the placebo effect is unreliable. Goldacre also concludes that the placebo effect does not justify alternative medicine, arguing that unscientific medicine could lead to patients not receiving prevention advice. Placebo researcher Fabrizio Benedetti also expresses concern over the potential for placebos to be used unethically, warning that there is an increase in "quackery" and that an "alternative industry that preys on the vulnerable" is developing.

== Mechanisms ==
The mechanism for how placebos could have effects is uncertain. From a sociocognitive perspective, intentional placebo response is attributed to the "ritual effect" that induces anticipation for transition to a better state. A placebo presented as a stimulant may trigger an effect on heart rhythm and blood pressure, but when administered as a depressant, the opposite effect.

=== Psychology ===
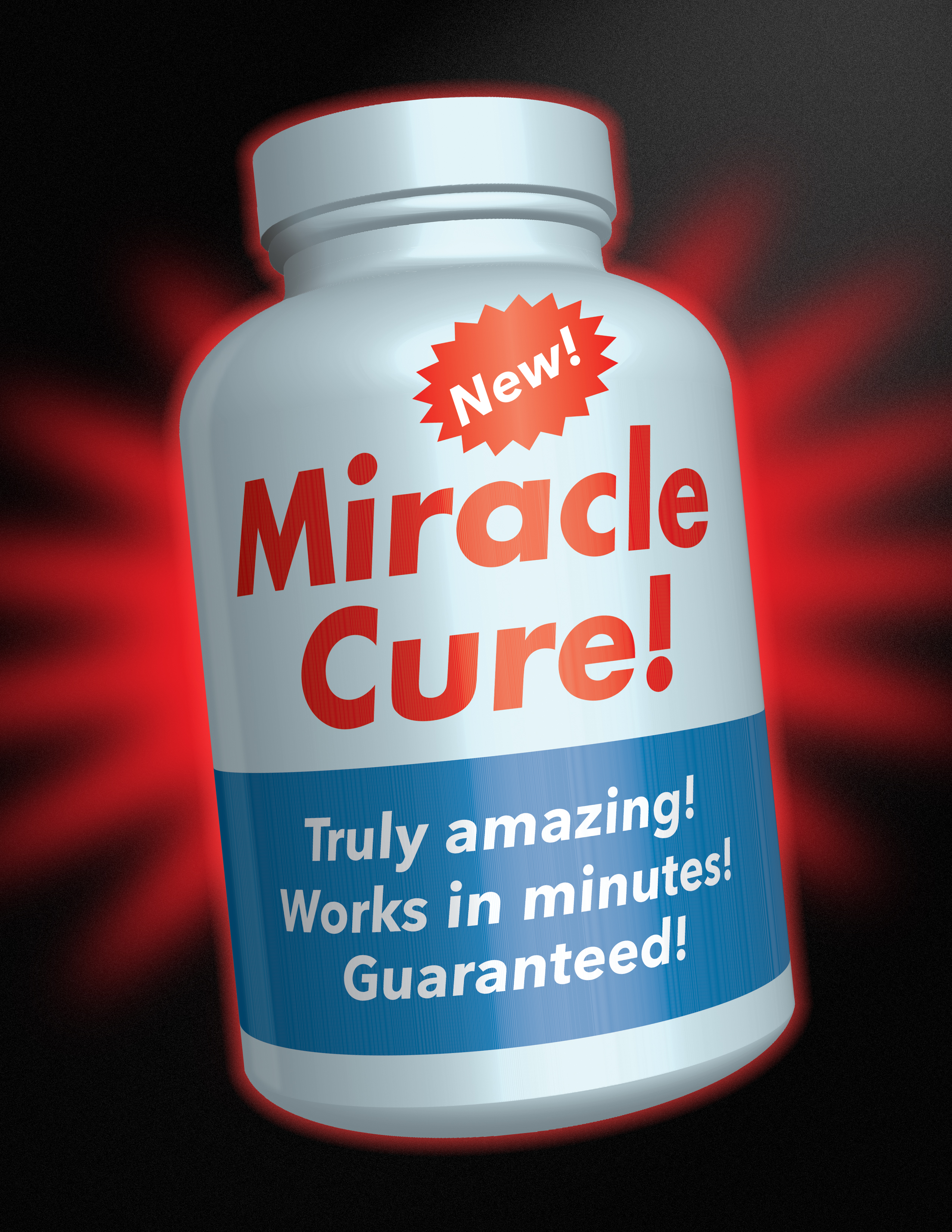
The subjective effects of placebos may be related to expectations, yet similar effects have been noted in open-label studies.

In psychology, the two main hypotheses of the placebo effect are expectancy theory and classical conditioning.

In 1985, Irving Kirsch hypothesized that placebo effects are produced by the self-fulfilling effects of response expectancies, in which the belief that one will feel different leads a person to actually feel different. According to this theory, the belief that one has received an active treatment can produce the subjective changes thought to be produced by the real treatment. Similarly, the appearance of effect can result from classical conditioning, wherein a placebo and an actual stimulus are used simultaneously until the placebo is associated with the effect from the actual stimulus. Both conditioning and expectations play a role in placebo effect, and make different kinds of contributions. Conditioning has a longer-lasting effect, and can affect earlier stages of information processing. Those who think a treatment will work display a stronger placebo effect than those who do not, as evidenced by a study of acupuncture.

Additionally, motivation may contribute to the placebo effect. The active goals of an individual changes their somatic experience by altering the detection and interpretation of expectation-congruent symptoms, and by changing the behavioral strategies a person pursues. Motivation may link to the meaning through which people experience illness and treatment. Such meaning is derived from the culture in which they live and which informs them about the nature of illness and how it responds to treatment.

=== Placebo analgesia ===
Functional imaging upon placebo analgesia suggests links to the activation, and increased functional correlation between this activation, in the anterior cingulate, prefrontal, orbitofrontal and insular cortices, nucleus accumbens, amygdala, the brainstem's periaqueductal gray matter, and the spinal cord.

Since 1978, it has been known that placebo analgesia depends upon the release of endogenous opioids in the brain. Such analgesic placebos activation changes processing lower down in the brain by enhancing the descending inhibition through the periaqueductal gray on spinal nociceptive reflexes, while the expectations of anti-analgesic nocebos acts in the opposite way to block this.

Functional imaging upon placebo analgesia has been summarized as showing that the placebo response is "mediated by 'top-down' processes dependent on frontal cortical areas that generate and maintain cognitive expectancies. Dopaminergic reward pathways may underlie these expectancies." "Diseases lacking major 'top-down' or cortically based regulation may be less prone to placebo-related improvement."

=== Brain and body ===
In conditioning, a neutral stimulus saccharin is paired in a drink with an agent that produces an unconditioned response. For example, that agent might be cyclophosphamide, which causes immunosuppression. After learning this pairing, the taste of saccharin by itself is able to cause immunosuppression, as a new conditioned response via neural top-down control. Such conditioning has been found to affect a diverse variety of not just basic physiological processes in the immune system but ones such as serum iron levels, oxidative DNA damage levels, and insulin secretion. Recent reviews have argued that the placebo effect is due to top-down control by the brain for immunity and pain. Pacheco-López and colleagues have raised the possibility of "neocortical-sympathetic-immune axis providing neuroanatomical substrates that might explain the link between placebo/conditioned and placebo/expectation responses." There has also been research aiming to understand underlying neurobiological mechanisms of action in pain relief, immunosuppression, Parkinson's disease and depression.

Dopaminergic pathways have been implicated in the placebo response in pain and depression.

== Confounding factors ==
Placebo-controlled studies, as well as studies of the placebo effect itself, often fail to adequately identify confounding factors. False impressions of placebo effects are caused by many factors including:

- Regression to the mean (natural recovery or fluctuation of symptoms)
- Additional treatments
- Response bias from subjects, including scaling bias, answers of politeness, experimental subordination, conditioned answers;
- Reporting bias from experimenters, including misjudgment and irrelevant response variables.
- Non-inert ingredients of the placebo medication having an unintended physical effect

== History ==
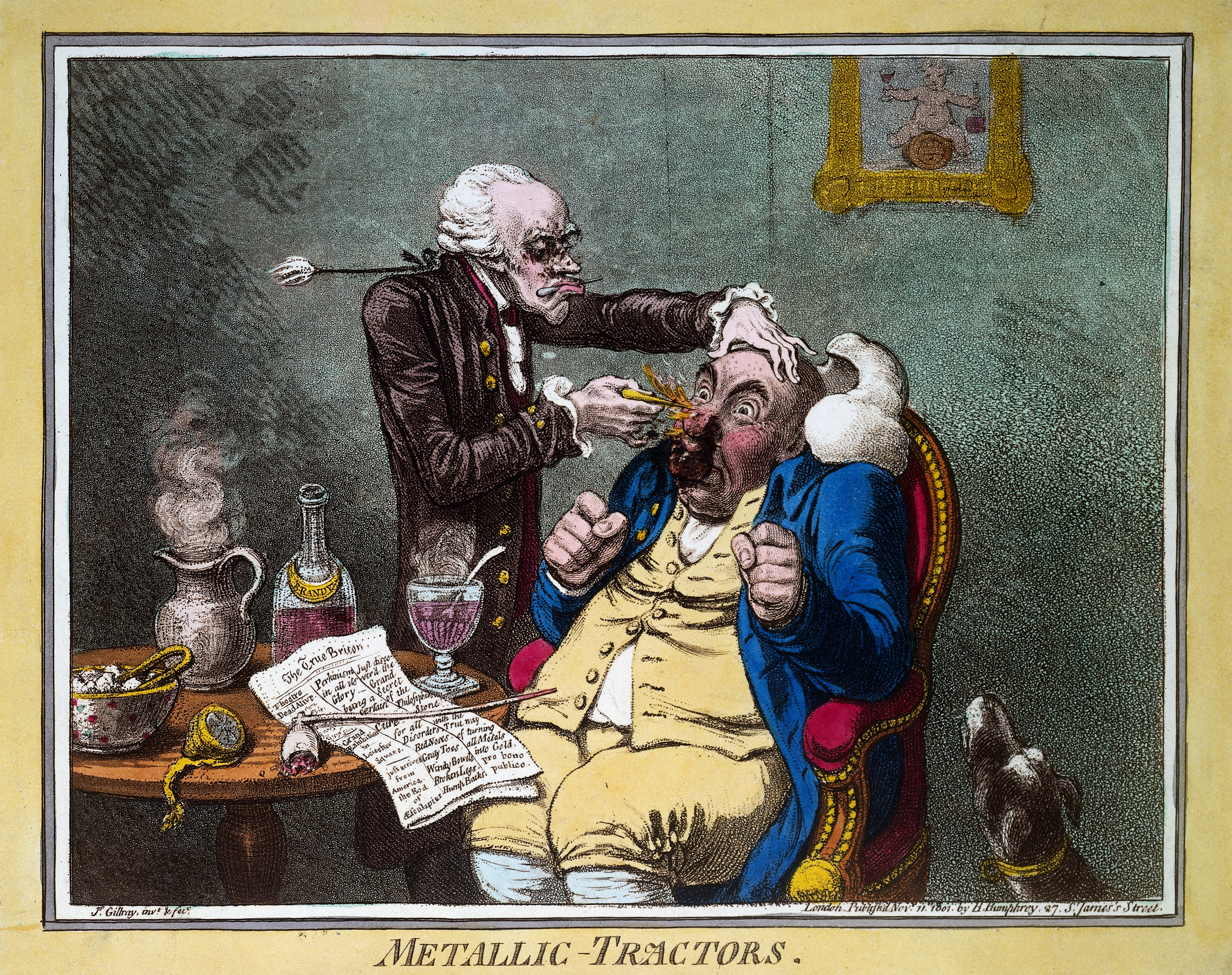
A quack treating a patient with Perkins Patent Tractors by James Gillray, 1801. John Haygarth used this remedy to illustrate the power of the placebo effect.

The word placebo was used in a medicinal context in the late 18th century to describe a "commonplace method or medicine" and in 1811 it was defined as "any medicine adapted more to please than to benefit the patient." Although this definition contained a derogatory implication it did not necessarily imply that the remedy had no effect.

It was recognized in the 18th and 19th centuries that drugs or remedies often were perceived to work best while they were still novel:

We know that, in Paris, fashion imposes its dictates on medicine just as it does with everything else. Well, at one time, pyramidal elm bark had a great reputation; it was taken as a powder, as an extract, as an elixir, even in baths. It was good for the nerves, the chest, the stomach—what can I say?— it was a true panacea. At the peak of the fad, one of Bouvard's [sic] patients asked him if it might not be a good idea to take some: "Take it, Madame", he replied, "and hurry up while it [still] cures." [dépêchez-vous pendant qu'elle guérit]

— Gaston de Lévis quoting Michel-Philippe Bouvart in the 1780s

Placebos have featured in medical use until well into the twentieth century. An influential 1955 study entitled The Powerful Placebo firmly established the idea that placebo effects were clinically important, and were a result of the brain's role in physical health. A 1997 reassessment found no evidence of any placebo effect in the source data, as the study had not accounted for regression to the mean.

=== Placebo-controlled studies ===
The placebo effect makes it more difficult to evaluate new treatments. Clinical trials control for this effect by including a group of subjects that receives a sham treatment. The subjects in such trials are blinded as to whether they receive the treatment or a placebo. If a person is given a placebo under one name, and they respond, they will respond in the same way on a later occasion to that placebo under that name but not if under another.

Clinical trials are often double-blinded so that the researchers also do not know which test subjects are receiving the active or placebo treatment. The placebo effect in such clinical trials is weaker than in normal therapy since the subjects are not sure whether the treatment they are receiving is active.

== Cultural influences ==
Cultural beliefs and religious practices can play a hidden role in how the patient experiences the strength of the placebo as well as the manifestation of it. In many cultures, healing is performed through rituals with trusted figures. These figures can span from clinical physicians to religious leaders. Nevertheless, the strong belief in treatment, medically, spiritually, and socially allows for an increase in exhibiting symptoms. Its main function is to give people and communities comfort and a sense of purpose. Even while these advantages are subjective, they can have genuine a person or group psychological and social impacts, much like a placebo. However, religion is a difficult opinion to define and discuss since it lies in a gap between one's lived experiences and observable phenomenon.

The different spirituality levels in individuals have been used to understand and predict how susceptible someone can be to a placebo. Religious practices or rituals such as prayers and meditation can activate brain processes that are closely linked to expectation and emotional control. Since these processes are also involved in the placebo effect, they can be used to explain how belief can turn into something physical. It can also be argued that spiritual practices connect experiences to “top-down” mechanisms, where belief, emotion, and expectation can influence how symptoms are experienced in the body.

Cultural views about medicine can also pivot the mindset as a person's cultural background can shape their physiological and psychological journey prior to even receiving any form of therapy. For example, if a treatment aligns with one’s cultural and religious beliefs, they might be more reassured and willing to trust healthcare administrators. These cases of optimism in expectation can increase the likelihood of the presentation of the placebo effect. In some cases, even more than the treatment itself, with responses varying person to person. This goes to show that the strength of belief and social environment in shaping biological responses. At the same time, these effects are not always positive. Positive beliefs work to strengthen placebo responses, but fear or negative spiritual experiences may contribute to the nocebo effect, where presentation of symptoms feel worse.

Anthropologists argue that culture affects the ways in which individuals perceive medication, from different rituals and methods of healing, leading to placebo. Hahn and Kleinman (1983) propose an "ethnomedicogenic thesis" of placebo, wherein the ethnomedical system generates a feedback loop: cultural beliefs influence the disease state produced and effective treatments reinforce the belief system.

"Symbolic effectiveness," a term coined by Claude Levi-Strauss relating to Shamanism, can result in a placebo effect as symbols displayed by the Shaman provide the patient with a form of "verbal expression" that can create a healing response within the patient. Apud and Romaní say that Shamans are a sort of psychoanalytical therapist, while many other cultural rituals and practices such as religion provide a psychological effect on the medical outcome of the patient, resulting in a placebo effect. In Buddhism, Traditional medicine healers often prepared herbal remedies with blessed waters and string ties, performing chants of one's own culture to the people in a way of showing how ritual, belief, and medicine were a combined healing process. These practices, passed down through generations, have become integral to the empirical experiences of diverse communities.

Hyland and Whalley conclude that carrying out a ritual, rather than believing in the ritual, may be an important factor in long-term placebo effects. One anthropological perspective of rituals describe them as repetitive activities that intend to provide a sense of significance to one's life, giving them a sense that their bodily experience is in the hands of the world, out of their control as a result of patterns and rules, external to their own body. Rituals are an attempt to "control nature," meaning that they can heal which results in the individual experience of placebo.

== See also ==
- E. Morton Jellinek § Recognition of placebo effect
- List of effects
- List of topics characterized as pseudoscience
- Amplified placebo effect
- Inverse placebo effect
- Lessebo effect
- Placebo button
- Self-fulfilling prophecy
