= Golem effect =

Psychological phenomenon

The Golem effect is a psychological phenomenon in which lower expectations placed upon individuals, either by supervisors or the individual themselves, lead to poorer performance by the individual. This effect is mostly seen and studied in educational and organizational environments. It is a form of self-fulfilling prophecy.

== Etymology ==
The effect is named after the golem, a clay creature that was given life by Rabbi Loew of Prague in Jewish mythology. According to the legend, the golem was originally created to protect the Jews of Prague from the horrors of Blood Libel; however, over time, the golem grew more and more corrupt to the point of spiraling violently out of control and had to be destroyed. The effect was named after the golem legend in 1982 by Babad, Inbar, and Rosenthal because it "represent[s] the concerns of social scientists and educators, which are focused on the negative effects of self-fulfilling prophecies".

== Process ==
The Golem effect has very similar underlying principles to its theoretical counterpart, the Pygmalion effect. Robert Rosenthal and Lenore Jacobson's Pygmalion in the Classroom and further experiments have shown that expectations of supervisors or teachers affect the performance of their subordinates or students. The most thoroughly studied situations of this effect are classrooms. When arbitrarily informed that a particular student is "bright" or "dull", not only will the supervisor's behavior change to favor the "bright" students (as indicated by more praise or attention), the students themselves will exhibit behaviors in line with their labels (such as the "bright" students leaning more forward in their chairs relative to the "dull" students). While the Pygmalion effect and the majority of studies focus on the positive side of this phenomenon, the Golem effect is the negative corollary. Supervisors with negative expectations will produce behaviors that impair the performance of their subordinates while the subordinates themselves produce negative behaviors. This mechanism is an example of a self-fulfilling prophecy: the idea that self-held beliefs can come true in reality. When both supervisor and subordinate notice the low performance, the negative expectations are confirmed and the belief is reinforced.

Up until Babad, Inbar, and Rosenthal, studies on teacher/supervisor expectancy and its effect on performance had primarily focused on the Pygmalion effect. Babad actually investigated the effect in his 1977 paper looking at developmentally challenged students but his 1982 paper is considered the seminal Golem effect article due to its more generalizable student population. As opposed to other past teacher-student expectancy studies, the authors asked their teachers to nominate three high-expectancy and three low-expectancy students out of each class instead of just high-expectancy nominations and a control group. In addition to replicating the findings of previous Pygmalion effect studies, the authors found support for the Golem effect. Teachers who were susceptible to biasing information treated their low-expectancy students more dogmatically than their high-expectancy students. Consequently, low-expectancy students performed worse than their high-expectancy counterparts. Teachers who were not susceptible to bias did not show any distinctions in behavior between high and low-expectancy students.

Although the majority of research looking at the Golem effect has focused on educational contexts, the effect has also been studied in the workplace. A study by Schrank that predated the Rosenthal and Jacobson article looked at US Air Force Academy airmen. The author induced a "labeling effect" by randomly assigning incoming freshmen to one of five class sections supposedly designating ability levels. McNatt performed a meta-analysis on studies with workplace samples and found that the Golem (and Pygmalion) effects still hold true to around the same magnitude at the workplace as they do in the classroom. Furthermore, the Golem effect can influence entire organizations, not just supervisors and their direct subordinates.

=== Absolute and relative ===
Davidson and Eden suggested there are two different types of Golem effects: absolute and relative. The absolute Golem effect occurs when the individuals who are identified as the low tier of their group are in fact underqualified for their group. For any given normal distribution of students or employees, this may be the case; there will be some individuals who do not meet the performance standards of the group. However, the more potentially dangerous type of effect is the relative Golem effect. In this case, the entire population is qualified to be in the group. However, because there will always be a "lower tier" even for a group of individuals who meet all of the performance standards of the group, the Golem effect could potentially degrade the performance of even highly skilled individuals. Davidson and Eden suggested a number of "de-Golemization" efforts such as convincing the group that the initial performance measures underestimate true potential in order to reduce this threat.

== Psychological mechanisms ==
Although the consequences of the Pygmalion/Golem effects are well documented, the mechanisms behind them are more disputed among researchers. Both effects have been argued to stem from Victor Vroom's expectancy theory. This theory posits that people are more likely to perform behaviors that they believe they have a high expectation of performing successfully. In relation to the Golem effect, when expectations are set low by the supervisor, subordinates do not require as much effort to successfully reach their performance expectation, which consequently results in lower performance. Rowe and O'Brian argued that the Golem effect was a result of transaction cost and agency theories. They posit that because teachers monitor their classes for opportunistic behaviors, some students may take such monitoring as a sign that the teacher does not trust them and, in turn, engage in opportunistic behavior because it is expected of them. Although there have been proposed models of self-fulfilling prophecies including the Pygmalion/Golem effect, no model has been empirically tested. This lack of research is especially glaring considering the golem effect is heavily involved with other established motivational theories and organizational behavior concepts such as self-efficacy, leader-member exchange, and transformational leadership.

== Methodological issues ==
There is currently a relative paucity of research that directly addresses Golem effects, and an even lesser body that measures and examines it. There are a multitude of reasons cited for this scarcity, but the most common reason involves the ethical concerns raised in examining negative and potentially harmful phenomenon. Specifically, the concern arises in trying to operationalize negative expectancies in individuals, which will theoretically result in their lower performance. The worry then is the possible harmful, lingering effects on research participants beyond the study due to this manipulation. These effects could originate either from the participant having the knowledge that they performed worse than others, were unwittingly manipulated to perform worse, or were viewed negatively by a superior in the research paradigm; on the other hand, participants in a position of superiority that were manipulated to have negative expectancies may feel guilty about treating others differently following the experiment. Whatever the exact effect may be, these concerns have resulted in many researchers only making passive mention of the Golem effect in studies or ignoring it entirely.

However, there is reason to believe that the apprehension towards conducting Golem studies may not be entirely well founded, as evidenced by several studies that have successfully set out to measure the effect explicitly. For example, Feldman & Prohaska used confederate subordinates to elicit negative expectations from subjects acting as students or teachers; in doing so, the ethical concerns of subjects having to be direct "victims" of the Golem effect were avoided. Oz & Eden designed a study in which military squad leaders were differentiated by treatment and control conditions. In the treatment condition, squad leaders' perceptions were manipulated as to believe that low scores on a physical fitness test were not indicative of a subordinate's ineptitude, whereas the control condition involved no manipulation. Thus, the Golem effect was measured indirectly through theoretically creating a "buffer" from the effect in the treatment condition. In this manner, the experimenters never actually created the Golem effect in their participants; rather, they measured a naturally occurring Golem effect in comparison to a "Golem treatment" group.

There is evidence that even studies that directly generate and measure Golem effects in participants are still very viable and can be passed by ethics boards and other regulatory bodies. Reynolds designed a study in which support instructors for an introductory management course were led to believe they were assigned either lower-performing or higher-performing students based on a pretest, although the actual assignment was completely random and arbitrary. He was able to demonstrate the Golem effect from this manipulation on a posttest (in which the "lower-performing" students actually performed worse, and the "higher-performing students" performed better), showing that it is very feasible to design studies that measure the effect in a more direct and controlled fashion without being shut down by regulatory bodies. However, studies such as this are regrettably still extremely scarce in current Golem research.

== Pygmalion effect ==
See also Pygmalion effect

Compared to the Golem effect, the Pygmalion effect enjoys a far greater body of literature; this is most likely due to the fact that this research is free from the ethical challenges of examining Golem effects. More specific and involved discussion of the Pygmalion effect is beyond the scope of this article, but several recent studies on this effect are worth mentioning in regards to their implications for the Golem effect and future research. Although the Pygmalion effect has been studied in great detail using experimental and quasi-experimental designs, due to the methodological issues surrounding the Golem effect, most of the conclusions drawn on the Golem effect have been from correlational data from Pygmalion studies.

=== Cross-cultural effects ===
Recent research has explored the Pygmalion effect in cultural settings not previously studied. For example, a recent study examined how Japanese humanitarian aid workers stationed in different countries across the world perceived and interacted with the local organizations that they consulted with. The researchers found support for the notion that when the aid workers held more positive perceptions of their local colleagues, higher levels of organizational performance were observed. Such findings raise the question of whether Golem effects would also be observed in such multicultural settings and provides ample opportunity for future research inquiry.

=== Golem in reverse ===
Many modern organizations are starting to face a new challenge in superior/subordinate relationships: the older employee reporting to a younger supervisor. This particular situation is expected to occur more and more as the baby boomer generation reaches retirement age. As such, there is great opportunity for research in examining the effects of older employees' expectations and perceptions of younger supervisors, a phenomenon that has been labeled as Reverse Pygmalion. A reverse Pygmalion effect is not synonymous with the Golem effect. In both the regular Pygmalion and Golem effects, the expectations of the supervisor have an effect on the performance of the subordinate while in the reverse Pygmalion and Golem effects, the expectations of the subordinate have an effect on the performance of the supervisor. To date, there has been little research on the subject; however, one study found that, compared to younger workers, older workers with younger supervisors expected less out of their supervisors, and consequently rated their leadership behaviors as lower than in other conditions. While this study refers to the effect studied as Reverse Pygmalion, it appears to be also lending credence to the possibility of a Reverse Golem effect existing, in that subordinates' negative expectations of supervisors may consequently influence supervisor behavior in a negative fashion. This would be an example of the "reverse" phenomenon due to the fact that the typical Golem effect runs in the direction of supervisor's expectation down to subordinates' behavior. However, more research is clearly needed to fully and rigorously test such speculation.

=== Group settings ===
Lastly, there have been concerns raised about the Pygmalion effect possibly being an artifact of interpersonal contrast effects; by experimentally focusing high expectations on a treatment group, the control group (which typically receives no manipulation in Pygmalion studies) naturally is perceived with lower expectations. As such, the perceived difference between individuals becomes the driving force instead of high expectations alone. However, Eden demonstrated that this concern was not supported through manipulating entire groups (in this case, separate military squads randomly receiving Pygmalion versus control status); he found that the Pygmalion effect was still observed beyond the scope of any contrast effects as evidenced by higher mean performances of groups with leaders that received Pygmalion manipulation when compared to controls. It would be of significant value to the Golem research literature to see whether Golem effects are also unaffected by interpersonal contrast effects through similar group study designs.

== Implications ==
The Golem effect has many implications for various organizational settings, from schools to sports to multimillion-dollar corporations. Public education systems are likely to be very familiar with Golem effects in the form of controversy surrounding tracking systems, which have been almost completely abandoned in education today due to their inefficacy and detrimental effects. While tracking systems varied widely from school to school, the message conveyed to many students placed in remedial tracks was that of low expectations, which, in line with Golem research, led to poorer performance and behaviors. There is also great relevance for the Golem effect in sports, where a coach (a superior) must frequently gauge his or her outward displays of expectations towards individual teammates (the subordinate) in order to ensure that he/she is not sending negative messages. Such negative messages have the possibility to affect players' performance significantly. As such, it is far more ideal for coaches to engender high expectations towards all team members in order to harness the power of the Pygmalion effect.

Finally, there is something to be said about Golem effects towards disenfranchised and stigmatized demographics in society such as the homeless, intellectually disabled, and other groups often looked down upon. Due to the low expectations often cast upon individuals in these groups by society as a whole, there is reason to believe that such individuals suffer from Golem effects in a truly significant and crippling manner. However, multiple government and non-profit programs are trying to aim towards recognizing and possibly helping these individuals to succeed in the modern workforce.

== See also ==
- Educational psychology
- Industrial and organizational psychology
- Role suction
- Soft bigotry of low expectations
- Stereotype threat
