= Self-fulfilling prophecy =

Prediction that causes itself to become true

A self-fulfilling prophecy is a prediction that comes true at least in part as a result of a person's belief or expectation that the prediction would come true. In the phenomena, people tend to act the way they have been expected to in order to make the expectations come true. Self-fulfilling prophecies are an example of the more general phenomenon of positive feedback loops. A self-fulfilling prophecy can have either negative or positive outcomes. Merely applying a label to someone or something can affect the perception of the person/thing and create a self-fulfilling prophecy. Interpersonal communication plays a significant role in establishing these phenomena as well as impacting the labeling process.

American sociologists W. I. Thomas and Dorothy Swaine Thomas were the first Western scholars to investigate this phenomenon. In 1928, they developed the Thomas theorem (also known as the Thomas dictum): "If men define situations as real, they are real in their consequences." Another American sociologist, Robert K. Merton, continued the research, and is credited with coining the term "self-fulfilling prophecy" and popularizing the idea that "a belief or expectation, correct or incorrect, could bring about a desired or expected outcome." The works of philosophers Karl Popper and Alan Gewirth also contributed to the idea.

== History ==
An early precursor of the concept appears in Edward Gibbon's Decline and Fall of the Roman Empire: "During many ages, the prediction, as it is usual, contributed to its own accomplishment".

The phrase "self-fulfilling prophecy" was coined by Robert K. Merton, a sociologist who also developed the ideas of anomie, social structure, and the modes of individual adaption. In his book Social Theory and Social Structure, he uses the example of a bank run to show how self-fulfilling thoughts can make unwanted situations happen. In his illustration, rumors spread about the town that the local bank is going to file for bankruptcy, causing many people to rush to the bank and close their accounts. Because banks do not keep their total assets in cash, the bank was unable to fulfill all its customers' withdrawals, which eventually caused the bank to go bankrupt. Merton concludes with the analysis, "The prophecy of collapse led to its own fulfillment".

While Merton's example focused on self-fulfilling prophecies within a community, self-fulfilling prophecies also apply to individuals, as individuals often conform to the expectations of others. This is also known as the Pygmalion effect, based on the experiments by Robert Rosenthal and Lenore Jacobson, where teachers were told that a random selection of students were expected to perform exceptionally well; those students showed a significant increase in test scores at the end of the year.

Philosopher Karl Popper called the self-fulfilling prophecy the Oedipus effect:

One of the ideas I had discussed in The Poverty of Historicism was the influence of a prediction upon the event predicted. I had called this the "Oedipus effect", because the oracle played a most important role in the sequence of events which led to the fulfilment of its prophecy. [...] For a time I thought that the existence of the Oedipus effect distinguished the social from the natural sciences. But in biology, too—even in molecular biology—expectations often play a role in bringing about what has been expected.

The idea is similar to that discussed by the philosopher William James as "The Will to Believe." But James viewed it positively, as the self-validation of a belief.

== Applications ==
Examples abound in studies of cognitive dissonance theory and the related self-perception theory; people will often change their attitudes to come into line with what they profess publicly.

In the United States, the concept was broadly and consistently applied in the field of public education reform, following the War on Poverty, as teacher expectations have been shown to influence student academic performance. Theodore Brameld noted: "In simplest terms, education already projects and thereby reinforces whatever habits of personal and cultural life are considered to be acceptable and dominant." The effects of teacher attitudes, beliefs, and values, affecting their expectations have been tested repeatedly, most notably in the Pygmalion in the Classroom study, where teachers were told arbitrarily that random students were likely to show significant intellectual growth. As a result, those random students actually ended the year with significantly greater improvement when given another IQ test. Though the changes may be subconscious, teachers who have higher expectations typically give "more time to answer questions, more specific feedback, and more approval". Likewise, students who have positive experiences with their teachers may study more. Academic self-fulfilling prophecies can be negative, however: one study indicated that female students may perform worse if they expect their male instructor to be sexist.

The phenomenon of the "inevitability of war" is a self-fulfilling prophecy that has received considerable study.

Fear of failure leads to deterioration of results, even if the person is objectively able to adequately cope with the problem. For example, fear of falling leads to more falls among older people.

Americans of Chinese and Japanese origin are more likely to die of a heart attack on the 4th of each month, due to the number four being considered unlucky and a portent of death.

Moore's law predicting that the number of transistors in an integrated circuit (IC) doubles about every two years is often considered as a self-fulfilling prophecy.

The belief that a bank is insolvent may help create the fact, but confidence in the bank's prospects may improve them. Similarly, stock-exchange panics and speculative bubbles can be both triggered by a widespread belief that the stock will go down (or up), thus starting the selling/buying mass move, etc.

People adapt to the judgments and assessments made by society, regardless of whether they were originally correct or not. There are certain prejudices against a socially marginalized group (e.g., homeless people, drug addicts or other minorities), and therefore, people in this marginalized group actually begin to behave in accordance with expectations.

=== Relationships ===
A leading study by Columbia University found that self-fulfilling prophecies have some part in relationships: the beliefs by people in relationships can impact the likelihood of a breakup or the overall health of the relationship. L. Alan Sroufe suggested that "rejection expectations can lead people to behave in ways that elicit rejection from others." The study looked at the inner workings behind the role of self-fulfilling prophecies in romantic relationships of people who were deemed high in rejection sensitivity, which was defined as "the disposition to anxiously expect, readily perceive, and overreact to rejection". The study found that women were more likely to experience rejection sensitivity in comparison to the negativity held by men about the future of their relationships, and that women sensitive to rejection "may be more likely to behave in ways that exacerbate conflicts," which could lead to behavior that would "erode their partners' relationship satisfaction and commitment."

Other specific examples discussed in psychology include:

- "Clever Hans" effect
- Observer-expectancy effect
- Hawthorne effect
- Placebo effect
- Nocebo effect
- Pygmalion effect
- Stereotype threat

=== International relations ===
Self-fulfilling prophecies have been apparent throughout history with the 'Thucydides trap': the occurrence of a rising power threatening a ruling or dominant power. Thucydides was an Athenian historian and general who recorded the Peloponnesian war between Sparta and Athens. He wrote, "It was the rise of Athens and the fear that this instilled in Sparta that made war inevitable."

Another example of self-fulfilling prophecies is the United States' invasion of Iraq in 2003. The invasion was based on the assumption that Iraq posed a terrorist threat to the United States, though evidence shows that no threat was actually posed. The invasion and subsequent overthrowing of the Ba'athist regime created the conditions for an insurgency that resulted in Iraq becoming a stronghold for the terrorist organization Al Qaeda, thus fulfilling the initial belief of a potential threat.

== Stereotype ==
Self-fulfilling prophecies are one of the main contributions to racial prejudice and vice versa. According to the Dictionary of Race, Ethnicity & Culture, "Self-fulfilling prophecy makes it possible to highlight the tragic vicious circle which victimizes people twice: first, because the victim is stigmatized with an inherent negative quality; and secondly, because he or she is prevented from disproving this quality." An example is given where white workers expected that black people would be against the principles of trade unionism because they considered black workers to be "undisciplined in traditions of trade unionism and the art of collective bargain-ing." Due to this belief, black workers were not hired at white-owned businesses, which made black workers unable to learn the principles of trade unionism, and thus prevented them from unionizing.

Teachers can encourage stereotype-based courses and can interact with students in a manner that encourages self-fulfilling thoughts: for example, female students may seem to be bad at math if teachers never encouraged them to improve their mathematical abilities.

The term "self-fulfilling prophecy" made its first appearance in educational literature in the 1960s, when African-American psychologist Kenneth B. Clark studied the responses of black children to black and white dolls. The responses from Clark's study ranged from some children calling the black doll ugly to one girl bursting into tears when prompted to pick the doll she identified with. The black children internalized the inferiority they learned and acted accordingly. Clark, whose work pushed the Supreme Court to desegregate schools, noted the influence of teachers on the achievement levels between Black and White students. This prompted Clark to begin a study in ten inner-city schools where he assessed the attitudes and behaviors of teachers. The belief held by teachers was that minority students were unintelligent, and therefore the teachers put no effort into teaching them. This led to a feedback loop of those students not being educated, and thus being perceived as unintelligent.

== Literature, media, and the arts ==
In literature, self-fulfilling prophecies are often used as plot devices. They have been used in stories for millennia, but are especially popular in science fiction and fantasy. They are often used for dramatic irony, with the prophesied events coming to pass due to the attempts to prevent the prophecy. They are also sometimes used as comic relief.

=== Classical ===
Many myths, legends, and fairy-tales make use of this motif as a central element of narratives that are designed to illustrate inexorable fate, fundamental to the Hellenic world-view. In a common motif, a child, whether newborn or not yet conceived, is prophesied to cause something that those in power do not want to happen, but the prophesied events come about as a result of the actions taken to prevent them.

==== Greek ====
The word "prophet" is derived from the Greek word prophete, meaning "one who speaks for another."

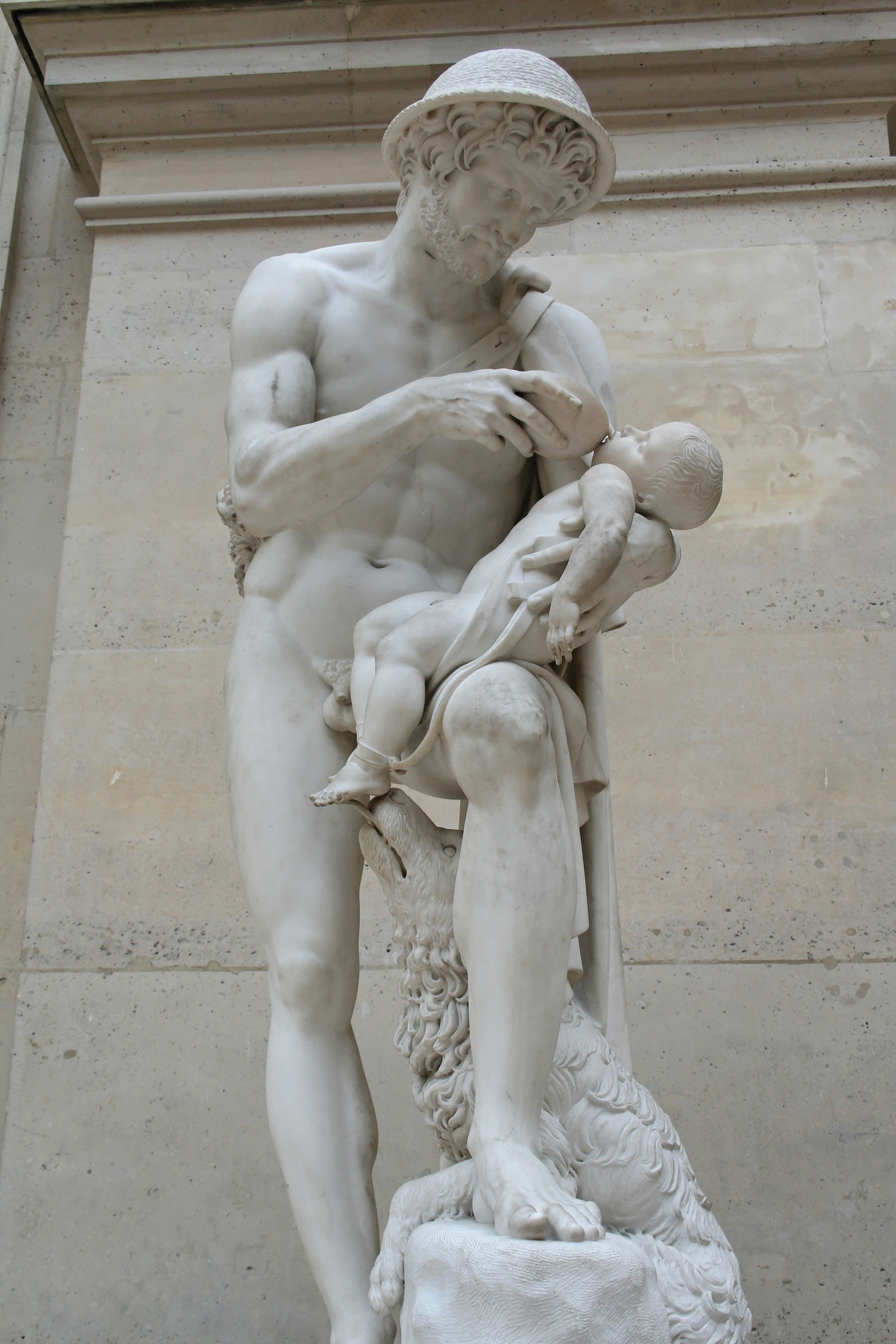
Oedipus in the arms of Phorbas

The best-known example from Greek legend is that of Oedipus. Warned that his child would one day kill him, Laius abandoned his newborn son Oedipus to die, but Oedipus was found and raised by others, and thus in ignorance of his true origins. When he grew up, Oedipus was warned that he would kill his father and marry his mother. He sought to avoid this, and, believing his foster parents to be his real parents, left his home and travelled to Greece, eventually reaching the city where his biological parents lived. There, he got into a fight with a stranger, killed him, and married his widow, only to discover that the stranger he had killed was his biological father, and his new wife was his biological mother.

Although the legend of Perseus opens with the prophecy that he will kill his grandfather Acrisius, the prophecy is only self-fulfilling in some variants. In some, he accidentally spears his grandfather at a competition—an act that could have happened regardless of Acrisius' response to the prophecy. In other variants, his presence at the games is due to his hearing of the prophecy. In still others, Acrisius is one of the wedding guests when Polydectes tries to force Danaë to marry him, and is accidentally killed when Perseus turns all the guests to stone with the Gorgon's head.

Greek historiography provides a famous variant: when the Lydian king Croesus asked the Delphic Oracle if he should invade Persia, the response came that if he did, he would destroy a great kingdom. Assuming this meant he would succeed, he attacked, only to fail—the kingdom he destroyed was his own.

When it was predicted that Cronos would be overthrown by his son, and usurp his throne as King of the Gods, Cronus ate his children, each shortly after they were born, enraging his wife, Rhea. To get revenge, when she bore Zeus, she gave Cronos a stone to eat instead, sending Zeus to be raised by Amalthea. Cronos' attempt to avoid the prophecy made Zeus his enemy, ultimately leading to its fulfilment.

==== Roman ====
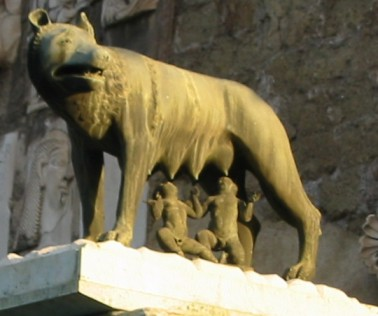
Romulus and Remus nursed by a she-wolf

The story of Romulus and Remus is another example. According to legend, a man overthrew his brother, the king. He then ordered that his two nephews, Romulus and Remus, be drowned, fearing that they would someday kill him as he did to his brother. The boys were placed in a basket and thrown in the Tiber River. A wolf found the babies and she raised them. Later, a shepherd found the twins and named them Romulus and Remus. As teenagers, they discovered their heritage, and killed their uncle in revenge, fulfilling the prophecy.

==== Arabic ====
A variation of the self-fulfilling prophecy is the self-fulfilling dream, which dates back to medieval Arabic literature. Several tales in the One Thousand and One Nights, also known as the Arabian Nights, use this device to foreshadow what is going to happen, as a special form of literary prolepsis. A notable example is "The Ruined Man Who Became Rich Again Through a Dream", in which a man is told in his dream to leave his native city of Baghdad and travel to Cairo, where he will discover the whereabouts of some hidden treasure. The man travels there and experiences misfortune after losing belief in the prophecy, ending up in jail, where he tells his dream to a police officer. The officer mocks the idea of foreboding dreams and tells the protagonist that he himself had a dream about a house with a courtyard and fountain in Baghdad where treasure is buried under the fountain. The man recognizes the place as his own house and, after he is released from jail, he returns home and digs up the treasure. In other words, the dream not only revealed a course of action but allowed its revelation to be actualized. A variant of this story later appears in English folklore as the "Pedlar of Swaffham".

Another variation of the self-fulfilling prophecy can be seen in "The Tale of Attaf", where Harun al-Rashid consults his library (the House of Wisdom), reads a random book, "falls to laughing and weeping and dismisses the faithful vizier" Ja'far ibn Yahya from sight. Ja'far, "disturbed and upset flees Baghdad and plunges into a series of adventures in Damascus, involving Attaf and the woman whom Attaf eventually marries." After returning to Baghdad, Ja'far reads the same book that caused Harun to laugh and weep, and discovers that it describes his own adventures with Attaf. In other words, it was Harun's reading of the book that provoked the adventures described in the book to take place. This is an early example of reverse causality. In the 12th century, this tale was translated into Latin by Petrus Alphonsi and included in his Disciplina Clericalis. In the 14th century, a version of this tale also appears in the Gesta Romanorum and Giovanni Boccaccio's The Decameron.

==== Hinduism ====
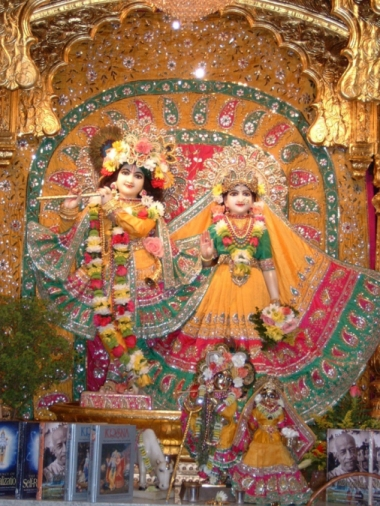
Krishna playing his flute with Radha

Self-fulfilling prophecies appear in classical Sanskrit literature. In the story of Krishna in the Indian epic Mahabharata, the ruler of the Mathura kingdom, Kamsa, afraid of a prophecy that predicted his death at the hands of his sister Devaki's son, had her cast into prison where he planned to kill all of her children at birth. After killing the first six children, and Devaki's apparent miscarriage of the seventh, Krishna (the eighth son) was born. As his life was in danger he was smuggled out to be raised by his foster parents Yashoda and Nanda in the village of Gokula. Years later, Kamsan learned about the child's escape and kept sending various demons to put an end to him. The demons were defeated at the hands of Krishna and his brother Balarama. Krishna, as a young man returned to Mathura to overthrow his uncle, and Kamsa was eventually killed by his nephew Krishna. It was due to Kamsa's attempts to prevent the prophecy that it came true, thus fulfilling the prophecy.

==== Ruthenian ====
Oleg of Novgorod was a Varangian prince who ruled over the Rus people during the early tenth century. As old East Slavic chronicles say, it was prophesied by the pagan priests that Oleg's stallion would be the source of Oleg's death. To avoid this he sent the horse away. Many years later he asked where his horse was, and was told that it had died. He asked to see the remains and was taken to the place where the bones lay. When he touched the horse's skull with his boot a snake slithered from the skull and bit him. Oleg died, thus fulfilling the prophecy. In the Primary Chronicle, Oleg is known as the Prophet, ironically referring to the circumstances of his death. The story was romanticized by Alexander Pushkin in his celebrated ballad "The Song of the Wise Oleg". In Scandinavian traditions, this legend lived on in the saga of Orvar-Odd.

==== European fairy-tales ====
Many fairy-tales, such as The Devil With the Three Golden Hairs, The Fish and the Ring, The Story of Three Wonderful Beggars, or The King Who Would Be Stronger Than Fate, feature a prophecy that a poor boy will marry a rich girl (or, less frequently, a poor girl will marry a rich boy). This is story type 930 in the Aarne–Thompson classification scheme. The girl's father's efforts to prevent it are the reason why the boy ends up marrying her.

Another fairy-tale occurs with older children. In The Language of the Birds, a father forces his son to tell him what the birds say: that the father would be the son's servant. In The Ram, the father forces his daughter to tell him her dream: that her father would hold an ewer for her to wash her hands in. In both, the father takes the child's response as evidence of malice and drives the child off; this allows the child to change so that the father will not recognize his own offspring later and so offer to act as the child's servant.

In some variants of Sleeping Beauty, such as Sun, Moon, and Talia, the sleep is not brought about by a curse, but a prophecy that she will be endangered by flax (or hemp) results in the royal order to remove all the flax or hemp from the castle, resulting in her ignorance of the danger and her curiosity.

==== Shakespeare ====
Shakespeare's Macbeth is another classic example of a self-fulfilling prophecy. The three witches prophecy that Macbeth will eventually become king, but that the offspring of his best friend will rule instead of his own. Spurred by the prophecy, Macbeth kills the king and his own friend, something he arguably would not have done otherwise, leading to a revolution against him, and his death. The later prophecy by the first apparition of the witches that Macbeth should "Beware Macduff" is also a self-fulfilling prophecy. If Macbeth had not been told this, then he might not have regarded Macduff as a threat. Therefore, he would not have killed Macduff's family, and Macduff would not have sought revenge and killed Macbeth.

=== Modern ===
==== New age religion ====
The law of attraction is a typical example of self-fulfilling prophecy. It is the name given to the belief that "like attracts like" and that by focusing on positive or negative thoughts, one can bring about positive or negative results. According to this law, all things are created first by imagination, which leads to thoughts, then to words and actions. The thoughts, words and actions held in mind affect someone's intentions which makes the expected result happen. Although there are some cases where positive or negative attitudes can produce corresponding results (principally the placebo and nocebo effects), there is no scientific basis to the law of attraction.

== Sports ==
Some researchers from 2008 found that in basketball, the head coaches gave more biased feedback while the assistant coaches gave more critical feedback. They predicted this was due to the external expectations from the coaches to the athletes which could have resulted in the Pygmalion effect with positive and negative results.

Researcher Helen Brown published findings of two experiments performed on athletes, investigating the effect that the media has on them, and concluded that the athlete's performance was impacted by and aligned with expectations of their performance. A follow-up experiment in London found that such expectations can impact their judgement and thought processes, and can even have a dangerous and destructive impact on some athletes.

== Causal loop ==
A self-fulfilling prophecy may be a form of causality loop. Predestination does not necessarily involve a supernatural power, and could be the result of other "infallible foreknowledge" mechanisms. Problems arising from infallibility and influencing the future are explored in Newcomb's paradox. A notable fictional example of a self-fulfilling prophecy occurs in classical play Oedipus Rex, in which Oedipus becomes the king of Thebes, whilst in the process unwittingly fulfills a prophecy that he would kill his father and marry his mother. The prophecy itself serves as the impetus for his actions, and thus it is self-fulfilling. The movie 12 Monkeys heavily deals with themes of predestination and the Cassandra complex, where the protagonist who travels back in time explains that he cannot change the past.

== See also ==
- Anticipation
- Baskerville effect
- Begging the question
- Bootstrapping (disambiguation)
- Confirmation bias
- Copycat effect
- Differential association
- Expectation (epistemic)
- Fake it till you make it
- Nominative determinism
- Observer effect (disambiguation)
- Ouroboros
- Reflexivity (social theory)
- Selection bias
- Self-defeating prophecy
- Self-licking ice cream cone
- Self-validating reduction
- Soft bigotry of low expectations
- Sunspots (economics)
- Tinkerbell effect
