= Copycat =

Copycat(s) or copy cat(s) may refer to:

== Crime ==
- Copycat crime, a criminal act that is modeled on previous crimes that have been reported in the media
- Copycat suicide, suicide inspired by or replicating another's suicide attempt

== Intellectual property rights ==
- Copyright infringement, use of another's ideas or words without permission
- Patent infringement, a violation of patent protection
- Plagiarism, the representation of another's language, thoughts, ideas, or expressions as one's own
- Shanzhai, a term denoting plagiarized design or technology in China
- Trademark infringement, a violation of trademark protection

== Science and technology ==
- CC (cat) (born 2001), first cloned pet
- Copycat (software), a computer model of analogy-making

== Television and film ==
=== Film ===
- Copy Cat (2020 film) (Faux-semblants), a French film directed by Akim Isker
- Copycat (1995 film), a thriller starring Sigourney Weaver and Holly Hunter
- Copycat (2015 film), a documentary short film by Charlie Shackleton

=== TV ===
- Copy Cats (TV series), British comedy sketch show from 1985 to 1987 broadcast on ITV
- "Copycat" (Blossom), a 1993 episode
- "Copycat" (Bluey), an episode of the Australian animated television series Bluey
- "Copycat", an episode of Miraculous: Tales of Ladybug and Chat Noir
- "The Copycat", an episode of The Real Ghostbusters
- Copycats, a British children's game show
- "The Copycats" (The Amazing World of Gumball), a 2017 episode

== Music ==
=== Albums ===
- Copy Cats (album), a 1988 album by Johnny Thunders and Patti Palladin

=== Songs ===
- "Copycat" (Apink Chobom song)
- "Copycat" (Billie Eilish song)
- "Copycat" (The Cranberries song)
- "Copycat" (Patrick Ouchène song)
- "Copycat", a song by Jinjer from Wallflowers (album)
- "Copy Cat", a song by Gary U.S. Bonds
- "Copy Cat", a song by Melanie Martinez
- "Copycat", a song by gothic metal band Lacrimosa
- "Copycat", a song by CircusP feat. GUMI

== Characters ==
- Copycat, a character in the Pokémon Red, Blue, and Yellow games
- Copycat (Marvel Comics), a comic book character in the Marvel Universe
- Copycat, a character in the Dv8 comic books
- The Copycats, a musical band of cats in the cartoon Kidd Video

== Other uses ==
- Copy Cats (short story collection), a short story collection by David Crouse
- CopyCat, a power in the board game Cosmic Encounter
- Copycat Building, building built in 1897 as a manufacturing warehouse

== See also ==
- Copycat (comics)
- Copycat effect (disambiguation)
- Copycat Killer (disambiguation)
- Watkins Copicat, an audio effects unit
