= Pygmalion in the Classroom =

1968 book by Robert Rosenthal

- Author: Robert Rosenthal, Lenore Jacobson
- Genre: Pedagogy
- Publication date: 1968

Pygmalion in the Classroom is a 1968 book by Robert Rosenthal and Lenore Jacobson about the effects of teacher expectation on first and second grade student performance. The idea conveyed in the book is that if teachers' expectations about student ability are manipulated early, those expectations will carry over to affect teacher behavior, which in turn will influence how the students will perform on an IQ test. Inducing high expectations in teachers will lead to high levels of IQ test performance. Inducing low expectations, will lead to low IQ test performance.

== Criticism ==
Soon after Pygmalion's publication, Robert L. Thorndike, an educational psychologist, criticized the study and demonstrated that the instrument used to assess the children's IQ scores was seriously flawed. For example, the average reasoning IQ score for the children in one regular class was in the mentally disabled range, which, given the circumstances, is impossible. In the end, Thorndike wrote the Pygmalion study's findings were worthless. He summarized his evaluation of the instrument this way: "When the clock strikes thirteen, doubt is not only cast on the last stroke but also on all that have come before....When the clock strikes 14, we throw away the clock." Rosenthal countered that "even if the initial test results were faulty, that didn’t invalidate the subsequent increase, as measured by the same test," although, with initial IQ scores in the mentally disabled range, the observed change at the conclusion of the study is more likely to reflect regression-to-the-mean effects than the effect of teacher expectations.

A major limitation has also been the lack of replication. "Most studies using product measures found no expectancy advantage for the experimental group, but most studies using process measures did show teachers to be treating the experimental group more favorably or appropriately than they were treating the control group...because teachers did not adopt the expectations that the experimenters were attempting to induce, and/or because the teachers were aware of the nature of the experiment." A meta-analysis indicates that the magnitude of the effect of inducing IQ-related expectancies in teachers is reduced by the amount of time teachers have spent getting to know their students prior to expectancy induction: although Raudenbush found the effect to be supported in general, it is much stronger when expectancy is induced at the beginning of the school year. When teachers have gotten to know their students for more than two weeks prior to expectancy induction, the impact of expectancy induction is virtually zero.

== See also ==
- Pygmalion effect
- Educational reform
- American educational system
