= The Devil and his Grandmother =

German fairy tale

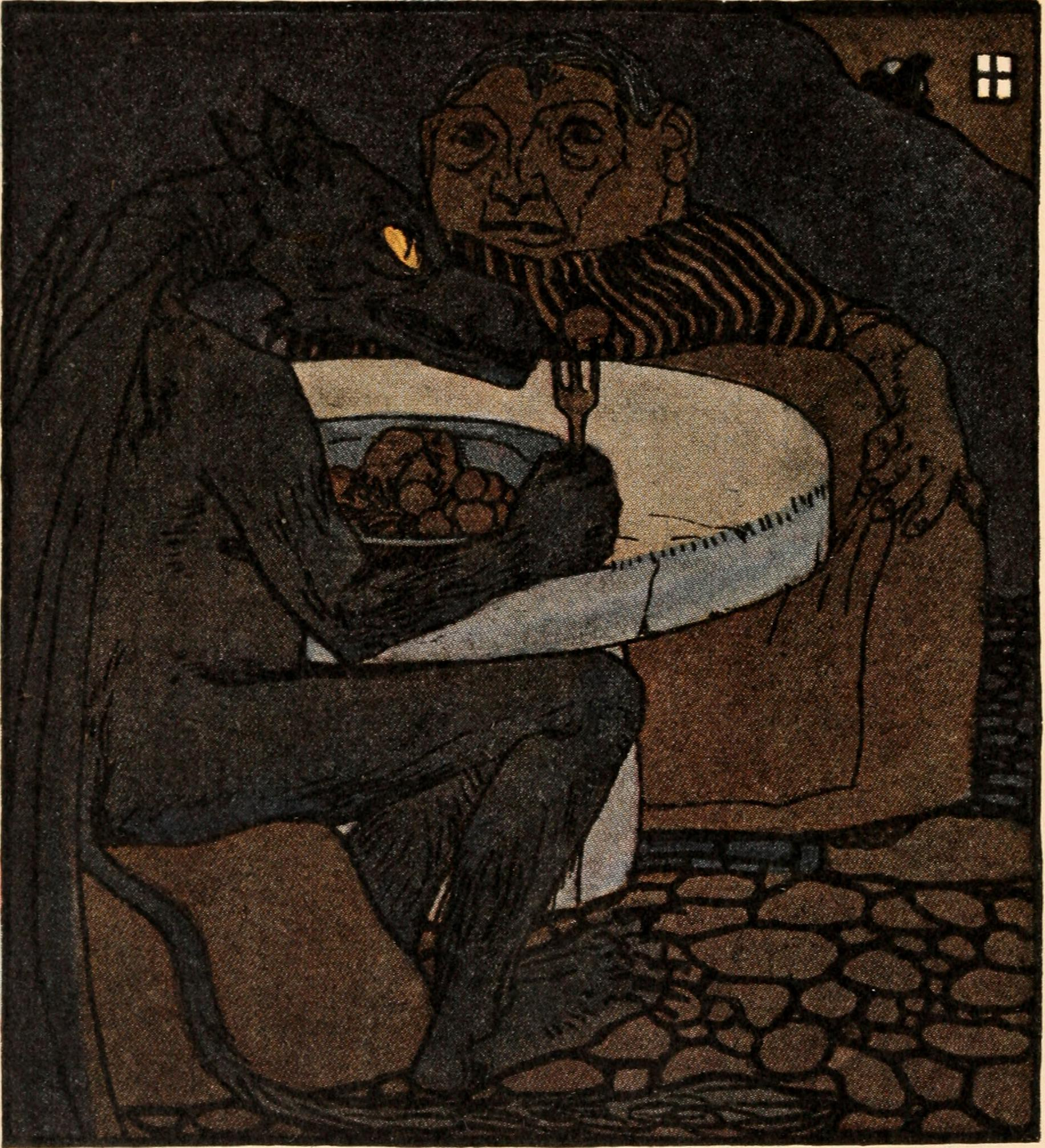
- 1910 illustration by Albert Weisgerber

Folk tale
- Name: The Devil and his Grandmother
- Also known as: The Dragon and His Grandmother
- Aarne–Thompson grouping: ATU 812
- Country: Germany
- Published in: Grimms' Fairy Tales

"The Devil and his Grandmother" or "The Dragon and His Grandmother" (German: Der Teufel und seine Großmutter) is a German fairy tale collected by the Brothers Grimm, number 125. According to Jack Zipes, the source of the story was Dorothea Viehmann, the wife of a tailor from Hesse.

Andrew Lang included it in The Yellow Fairy Book.

A version of this tale also appears in A Book of Dragons by Ruth Manning-Sanders.

It is Aarne-Thompson-Uther Index type 821, the devil's riddle.

== Synopsis ==
Three soldiers cannot live on their pay, and so desert by hiding in a cornfield. When the army does not march away, they are soon caught between starving or emerging to face execution. A dragon happens to fly by, however, and offers the three men salvation on the condition that they must serve him for seven years. When they agree, the dragon, named Westerlies, carries them off. However, the dragon is in fact the Devil. He gives them a whip with which they can make money, but says that at the end of seven years, they are his unless they can guess a riddle, in which case they will be freed and can keep the whip.

At the end of the seven years, two of the soldiers are morose at the thought of their fate. An old woman advises them to go to a cottage for help. The third soldier, who does not fear the riddle, goes and meets the Devil's grandmother. She is pleased with his manners and hides him in the cellar. When the Devil comes, she questions him, and the soldier learns the answers to the riddle.

The Devil finds them at the end of the seven years and says he will take them to Hell and serve them a meal. The riddle is: What was the meat, the silver spoon, and the wineglass for that meal. The soldiers give the correct answers: a dead sea-cat in the North Sea, a whale rib, and an old horse's hoof. No longer in the Devil's power, the soldiers live happily ever after thanks to the money-making whip.

== In popular culture ==
- The Devil and his Grandmother is featured in Grimm's Fairy Tale Classics under its "Grimm Masterpiece Theater" season where the story was referred to as "The Naughty Spirit." Additionally the third soldier is a drummer boy who the other two had forced to desert with them as he was the only one who knew the way back to the village they planned to flee to. Additionally the devil in this version is a gargoyle known as Beelzebub who is depicted as being a low level demon who is terrible at making riddles. The grandmother is omitted and the drummer boy learns the first two answers by spying on Beelzebub and the third he learns by praying to angels in heaven who take pity on him. Also Beelzebub's riddles are actually a goatskin made to look like silk, a billy goat made to look like a horse, and a cup of death made from the horn of a ram made to appear as a golden cup. After solving the riddles the three are returned to forest they were hiding in though the story ends with them running into the same regiment they had deserted forcing them to flee.
- The story inspired Mike Mignola's fifth issue of his series Hellboy In Hell called "The Three Gold Whips". The character also appears in the final issue, "For Whom the Bell Tolls".

== See also ==
- Bearskin
- The Devil With the Three Golden Hairs
- The Story of Three Wonderful Beggars
- The Prince and the Princess in the Forest
