= Lenore Jacobson =

Lenore F Jacobson was principal of an elementary school in the South San Francisco Unified School District in 1963 when she started a correspondence with Harvard psychologist Robert Rosenthal which led to the influential Pygmalion Effect study.

Jacobson, who had earned an MA at California State University, Sacramento in 1951, wrote to Rosenthal after he published a paper in American Scientist about the effect of researchers' expectations on their subjects in psychological experiments. In the article he mentioned the possibility that a similar self-fulfilling prophecy might be at work between teachers and students. After they had started to correspond, Jacobson offered Rosenthal her assistance and they agreed to collaborate on a study at her school. The experimental design for this research was finalised when Rosenthal went to San Francisco to meet Jacobson for the first time in 1964.

They published their findings in Psychological Reports, 1966, vol. 19. This led to the publication of Pygmalion in the Classroom in 1968.

Seven years later Jacobson and Paul M. Insel published What do you expect?: An inquiry into self-fulfilling prophecies (California 1975).

== Sources ==
- Robert Rosenthal, The Pygmalion Effect and its Mediating Mechanisms in Improving Academic Achievement: Impact of Psychological Factors on Education ed. Joshua Aronson (2002)
