= Bootstrapping (disambiguation) =

Bootstrapping is a self-starting process that is supposed to proceed without external input.

Bootstrapping, bootstrap, or bootstraps may also refer to:

- Bootstrap (front-end framework), a free collection of tools for creating websites and web applications
- Bootstrap curriculum, a curriculum which uses computer programming to teach algebra to students age 12–16
- Bootstrap funding in entrepreneurship and startups
- Bootstrap model, a class of theories in quantum physics
- Conformal bootstrap, a mathematical method to constrain and solve models in particle physics
- Bootstrapping (compilers), the process of writing a compiler in the programming language it is intended to compile
- Bootstrapping (electronics), a type of circuit that employs positive feedback
- Bootstrapping (finance), a method for constructing a yield curve from the prices of coupon-bearing products
- Bootstrapping (law), a former rule of evidence in U.S. federal conspiracy trials
- Bootstrapping (linguistics), a term used in language acquisition
- Bootstrapping (statistics), a method for assigning measures of accuracy to sample estimates
- Bootstrap aggregating, a method used to improve the stability and accuracy of machine learning algorithms
- Bootstraps, the stage name of American singer and songwriter Jordan Beckett
- Bootstraps: From an American Academic of Color

== See also ==
- Boot (disambiguation)
- "By His Bootstraps", a science fiction novella by Robert A. Heinlein
