= The Story of Three Wonderful Beggars =

Serbian fairy tale

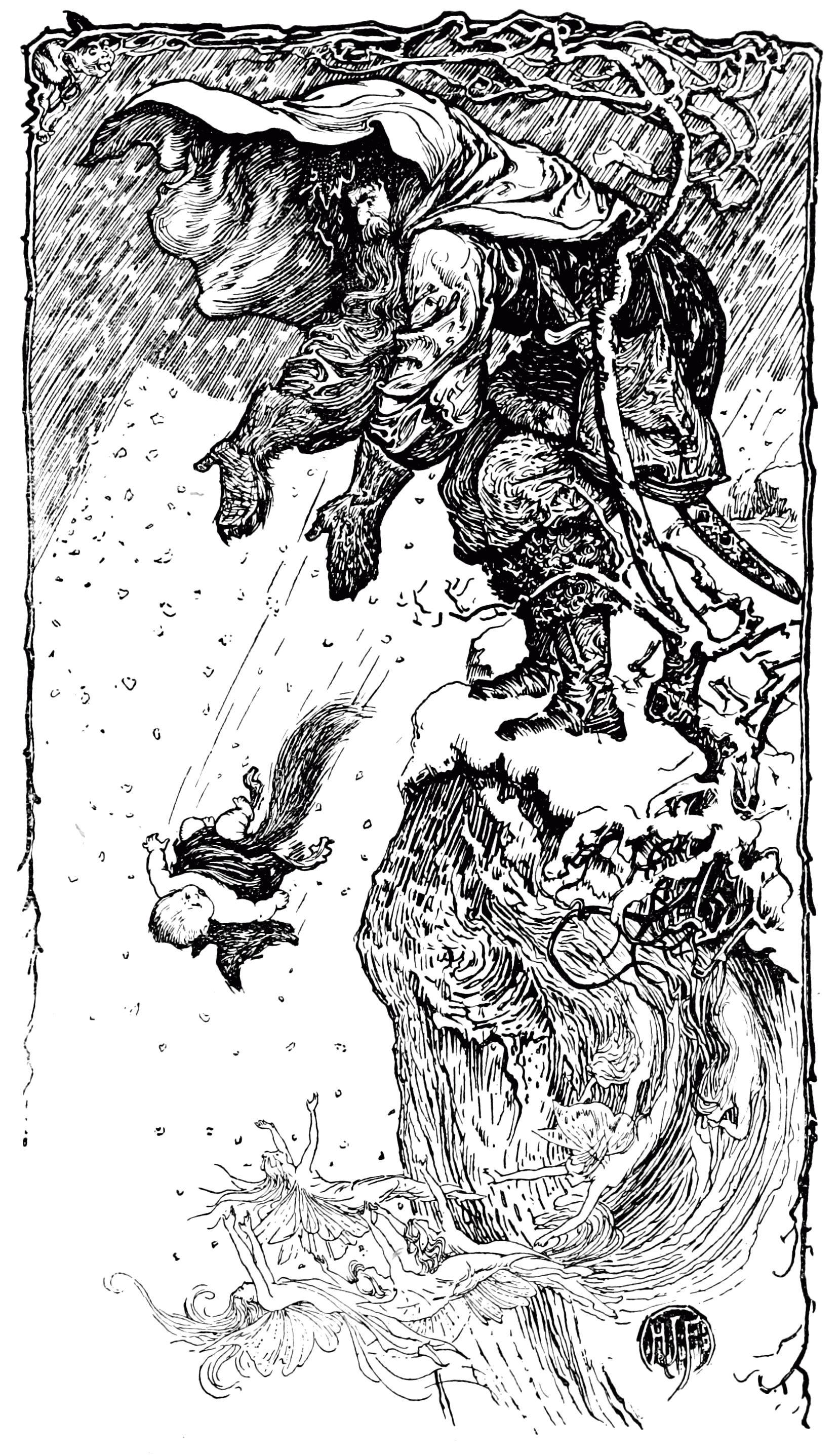
Illustration from The Violet Fairy Book

"The Story of Three Wonderful Beggars" is a Serbian fairy tale. It is also known as Vasilii the Unlucky its Russian form, collected by Alexander Afanasyev in Narodnye russkie skazki.

Andrew Lang included The Story of Three Wonderful Beggars in The Violet Fairy Book.

== Synopsis ==
A very rich and hard-hearted merchant, Mark or Marko, had one daughter, Anastasia. One day, he was about to set dogs on three beggars, when Anastasia pleaded with him. He let them stay in the stable loft. Anastasia went to see them. In the Russian version, they were then grandly dressed; in both, they decided to give Marko's wealth to a new-born named Vasilii, the seventh son of a poor peasant in a nearby village. She told her father. He went and found just such a boy had been born. He offered to be his godfather and then to raise the boy, giving the poor father a sum of money as well. When the father agreed, the merchant threw the baby over a cliff.

Other merchants picked up the child and brought him to Marko, who persuaded them to leave him with them. He put the boy in a barrel, or an open boat, and threw it into the sea. It floated to a monastery, where the abbot took the child in. Many years later, Marko passed by and heard the story. He persuaded the abbot that he wanted to take him in, and that he would give a large sum to the monastery for it. The abbot and monks agreed, and Marko sent him to his wife with a letter prescribing that he should be pushed into the soap-making cauldron at once.

Vasilii met the three beggars on the way, who breathed on the letter. When he arrived, the letter called for him to marry Anastasia at once. His wife obeyed, and Marko arrived to find a letter in his own handwriting calling for it. So he sent his son-in-law to collect rent from Tsar Zmey (Serpent Emperor).

In the Serbian version, he met an old oak which asks if he can discover why it can't fall. In both, he met a ferryman who asks if he can discover why he is bound to ferry people back and forth, and a whale being used as a bridge, which asks if he can discover how long it will be bound to this task.

At the castle, he met a maiden, who hid him and asked the Serpent King or Tsar Zmey in serpent form, about a dream she had had. He told her the oak had to be pushed over, which would reveal treasure, the ferryman had to push the boat off with another person in it, and the whale had to vomit up the twelve ships it had swallowed without leave. He went back, carefully not telling the whale and the ferryman until he had already crossed. In the Russian version, he received jewels from the whale; in the Serbian, he found gold and silver under the oak. He returned to Marko, who set out to make sure the next time, Vasilii would not be able to escape, but the ferryman pushed the boat off, and Marko is ferrying people still. No harm then came to Vasilii and he lived in peace with Anastasia inheriting all the lands and treasures of Marko the Rich.

== See also ==
- The Devil With the Three Golden Hairs
- The King Who Would Be Stronger Than Fate
- The Dragon and his Grandmother
- The Fish and the Ring
