= The King Who Would Be Stronger Than Fate =

Indian fairy tale

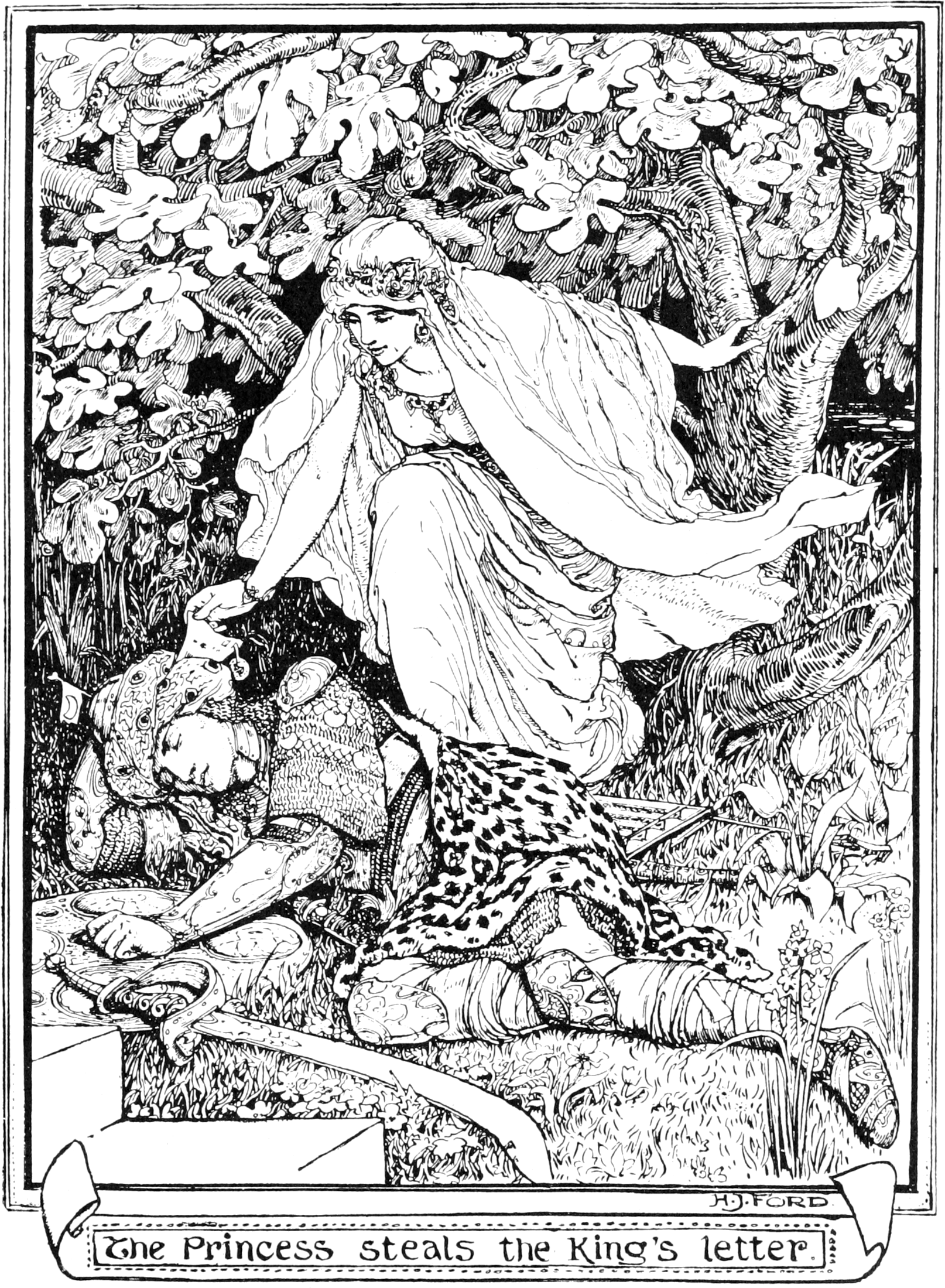
The Princess steals the letter

"The King Who Would Be Stronger Than Fate" is an Indian fairy tale, included by Andrew Lang in The Brown Fairy Book.

== Synopsis ==
A king with a daughter once was lost while hunting and met a hermit, who prophesied that his daughter would marry a slave woman's son, who belonged to the king of the north. As soon as he left the forest, he sent an offer to the king of the north for the slave woman and her son. The other king made him a present of them. He took them into the forest and cut off the woman's head, and left the child there.

A widow who raised goats found that her best nanny-goat returned without a drop of milk. She followed the animal when it went to the child, and thought she had at last a son to look after her in her old age.

When the boy was grown, a peddler's donkey started to eat his mother's cabbages, and so he beat it and drove it out. The tale was borne to the peddler, with added claims that the boy had threatened to kill the peddler. The peddler complained to the king, who sent men to seize the boy. The old woman pleaded for his life, because she needed him to support her. The king, not believing that so old a woman could have so young a son, demanded to know where she had gotten him, and hearing the story, knew who the child was.

The king let him off if he joined the army. When the army life did not kill him, though he was sent on the most dangerous missions, and he proved a good soldier, he was enrolled in the king's bodyguard and saved him from an assassin. The king was obliged to make him an attendant, and in his missions for the king, he was continually attacked but always escaped. Finally, the king sent him with a message to a distant governor, who had charge of the princess. The mischievous princess was up and about while the rest of the castle slept in the heat of the day and found that the message was to kill the bearer of it. She substituted a letter ordering the governor to marry him to the princess.

The king, on receiving the news, abandoned his efforts to harm the boy.

== Analysis ==
Folklorist Stith Thompson mentions in his seminal work The Folktale that the tale of the boy predestined to marry a princess can be found in the literary history of India, such is its antiquity.

The tale has several variants found across cultures about a poor boy that is "protected by Fate".

== See also ==
- The Devil With the Three Golden Hairs
- The Story of Three Wonderful Beggars
- The Fish and the Ring
