= Pygmalion effect =

Phenomenon in psychology

The Pygmalion effect is a psychological phenomenon in which high expectations lead to improved performance in a given area. It is named after the Greek myth of Pygmalion, the sculptor who fell so much in love with the perfectly beautiful statue he created that the statue came to life. The psychologists Robert Rosenthal and Lenore Jacobson present a view, that has been called into question as a result of later research findings, in their book Pygmalion in the Classroom; borrowing something of the myth by advancing the idea that teachers' expectations of their students affect the students' performance. Rosenthal and Jacobson held that high expectations lead to better performance and low expectations lead to worse performance, both effects being examples of self-fulfilling prophecy.

According to the Pygmalion effect, the targets of the expectations internalize their positive labels, and those with positive labels succeed accordingly; a similar process works in the opposite direction in the case of low expectations. The idea behind the Pygmalion effect is that increasing the leader's expectation of the follower's performance will result in better follower performance.

Within sociology, the effect is often cited with regard to education and social class. The Pygmalion effect remains controversial among social psychologists, because researchers have repeatedly failed to replicate the original finding of a strong, statistically significant effect.

== Rosenthal–Jacobson study ==
Robert Rosenthal and Lenore Jacobson's study showed that children's performance was enhanced if teachers were led to expect enhanced performance from children. By the same token, if teachers were led to expect lower performance from children, then the children's performance would be diminished. The authors purported that the study's results supported the hypothesis that performance can be positively or negatively influenced by the expectations of others. This phenomenon is called the observer-expectancy effect. Rosenthal argued that biased expectancies could affect reality and create self-fulfilling prophecies.

All students in a single California elementary school were given a disguised IQ test at the beginning of the study. These scores were not disclosed to teachers. Teachers were told that some of their students (about 20% of the school chosen at random) could be expected to be "intellectual bloomers" that year, doing better than expected in comparison to their classmates. The bloomers' names were made known to the teachers. At the end of the study, all students were again tested with the same IQ test used at the beginning of the study. All six grades in both experimental and control groups showed a mean gain in IQ from before the test to after the test. However, first- and second-graders showed statistically significant gains favoring the experimental group of "intellectual bloomers". This led to the conclusion that teacher expectations, particularly for the youngest children, can influence student achievement. Rosenthal believed that even attitude or mood could positively affect the students when the teacher was made aware of the "bloomers". The teacher may pay closer attention to and even treat the child differently in times of difficulty.

Rosenthal predicted that elementary school teachers may subconsciously behave in ways that facilitate and encourage the students' success. When finished, Rosenthal theorized that future studies could be implemented to find teachers who would encourage their students naturally without changing their teaching methods. Rosenthal and Jacobson's study of the Pygmalion effect was criticized for both weak methodology and lack of replicability (see Pygmalion in the Classroom).

The prior research that motivated this study was conducted in 1911 by psychologists regarding the case of Clever Hans, a horse that gained notoriety because it was supposed to be able to read, spell, and solve math problems by using its hoof to answer. Many skeptics suggested that questioners and observers were unintentionally signaling Clever Hans. For instance, whenever Clever Hans was asked a question the observers' demeanor usually elicited a certain behavior from the subject that in turn confirmed their expectations. For example, Clever Hans would be given a math problem to solve, and the audience would get very tense the closer he tapped his foot to the right number, thus giving Hans the clue he needed to tap the correct number of times.

== Mediator - leadership behavior ==
Leadership was identified by Eden and Shani as a mediator of the Pygmalion effect. The study discovered that trainees with strong command potential gave instructors better overall leadership evaluations than trainees in the control group. According to a later analysis of the survey by Eden, instructors were rated more positively on each of the four management leadership dimensions by Bowers and Seashore. Eden referred to this phenomenon as the Pygmalion leadership style (PLS). PLS includes consistently promoting, supporting, and reinforcing expectations, which leads to the subordinates adopting, accepting, or internalizing those expectations. Notably, those instructors needed to be made aware of their different manner of treating the trainees, supporting Rosenthal's claim that how instructors treat high-expectations people are not consciously intended or deliberate.

== Mediator - The Galatea effect ==
The second mediator of the Pygmalion effect is the direct result of PLS, labeled by Eden and Ravid as the Galatea effect, which is the effect of directly manipulating trainees' self-expectations of themselves. The PLS leadership behaviors have the chance to raise trainees' expectations of their performance. In the IDF training program study, Eden and Ravid observed that raising instructors' expectations for particular trainees led to both greater performance (the Pygmalion effect) and increased self-expectations for those trainees. The research also demonstrated that improving these trainees' performance levels may be accomplished by directly raising their expectations by telling them—rather than their instructors—that they had high potential.

== Criticism of the Pygmalion effect ==
The educational psychologist Robert L. Thorndike described the poor quality of the Pygmalion study. The problem with the study was that the instrument used to assess the children's IQ scores was seriously flawed. The average reasoning IQ score for the children in one regular class was in the mentally disabled range, a highly unlikely outcome in a regular class in a garden variety school. In the end, Thorndike concluded that the Pygmalion findings were worthless. Quoting a colleague, Thorndike wrote about the measurement problems of the study in this way: "When the clock strikes thirteen, doubt is cast not only on the last stroke but also all that have gone before" (p. 710). It is more likely that the rise in IQ scores from the mentally disabled range was the result of regression toward the mean, not teacher expectations. Moreover, a meta-analysis conducted by Raudenbush showed that when teachers had gotten to know their students for two weeks, the effect of a prior expectancy induction was reduced to virtually zero.

A 2005 meta-analysis of 35 years of research on teacher expectations found that, while self-fulfilling prophecies in the classroom do occur, the effects are usually small and temporary. It is unknown whether self-fulfilling prophecies affect intelligence or have an otherwise harmful effect. The cause of the effect may be because teachers' expectations of students are accurate, and not because they are self-fulfilling. Rosenthal had originally claimed the treatment group's IQ gain over time was "24.8 IQ points in excess of the gain shown by the controls," and that these gains were persistent and widespread, but several studies since the 1980s have failed to replicate these results. Instead, they have found only a very weak effect, and only in a very small minority (5 to 10%) of students. The marginal performance gains have also been found to "reset" after a period of just weeks.

== Students' views of teachers ==
Teachers are also affected by the children in the classroom. Teachers reflect what is projected into them by their students. An experiment done by Jenkins and Deno (1969) submitted teachers to a classroom of children who had either been told to be attentive, or inattentive, to the teachers' lecture. They found that teachers who were in the attentive condition would rate their teaching skills as higher. Similar findings by Herrell (1971) suggested that when a teacher was preconditioned to classrooms as warm or cold, the teacher would start to gravitate towards their precondition. To further this concept, Klein (1971) did the same kind of study involving teachers still unaware of any precondition to the classroom but with the class full of confederates who were instructed to act differently during periods over the course of the lecture. "Klein reported that there was little difference between students' behaviors in the natural and the positive conditions." In a more observational study designed to remove the likes of the Hawthorne effect, Oppenlander (1969) studied the top and bottom 20% of students in the sixth grade from a school that tracks and organizes its students under such criteria.

== Application in the workplace ==
The behavior a leader directs at an employee can affect employee behavior consistent with the leader's expectations. Leader expectations of an employee may alter leader behavior. For example, a leader may expect an employee to be engaged in learning activities and in turn, the employee may engage in more learning, consistent with the idea self-fulfilling prophecy. Leaders have power over employees (including the power to fire an employee) and, thus, behavior change in employees may be the result of that power differential.

== Application in military settings ==
The Pygmalion effect is further confirmed in military settings after its application in the workplace. Eden and Shani used instructors and trainees from Israeli Defense Force (IDF) training programs in 1982 to experiment with a military setting to verify the Pygmalion effect. They randomly chose a group of trainees and told the instructors that they had exceptional leadership potential. In turn, this group outperformed the control groups on four objective tests. This study was noteworthy since it used adult Israeli soldiers as a sample rather than the previous sample of the American child, inferring that the Pygmalion effect could be applied to different contexts rather than only the original classroom setting where it was originally noticed and replicated, confirming its generalisability.

== Application in nursing ==
The Pygmalion effect has been noted in several non-educational contexts. For instance, in a nursing home, nurses were told that some patients would progress more quickly in their rehabilitation than others. These patients demonstrated lower levels of depression and required hospitalization less frequently than those with average expectations.

The Pygmalion effect has also been discussed in relation to treating alcohol dependence since it was discovered that therapists who characterized their clients as "motivated" had a lower dropout rate than those who labeled them as "unmotivated".

== Gender limitations ==
One significant constraint of the practical application of Pygmalion research is the unresolved issue of whether the Pygmalion effect operates uniformly across genders. Notably, studies conclude a lack of the Pygmalion effect for women. This suggests that, unlike their male colleagues, the higher standards for female leaders could only sometimes result in increased subordinate performance.

Female subordinates have been utilized in many studies, which in turn failed to demonstrate a significant correlation between the Pygmalion effect. For instance, King's unpublished research in 1970 provided two examples of failed Pygmalion effect attempts that both primarily involved female subordinates. The Pygmalion effect was undetectable in Sutton and Woodman's research of female principal attendants in the retail industry.

== Ethical limitations ==
The traditional Pygmalion practice entails deception, which may be considered unethical in actual organizational contexts. According to some researchers, it should not be made a default practice in these real-life circumstances. Managers have to be deceived by their boss or staff personnel during the implementation of this manipulation. If the deception were revealed and revealed publicly, it could lead to a significant deterioration of trust within the workplace.

== See also ==
- Golem effect
- Law of attraction (New Thought)
- List of eponymous laws
- Matthew effect
- Placebo effect
- Positive feedback
- Sports psychology
- Stereotype threat
- Self-fulfilling prophecy
- Soft bigotry of low expectations
- Zone of proximal development
