= Expectation (philosophy) =

Anticipation that a future event or consequence is likely

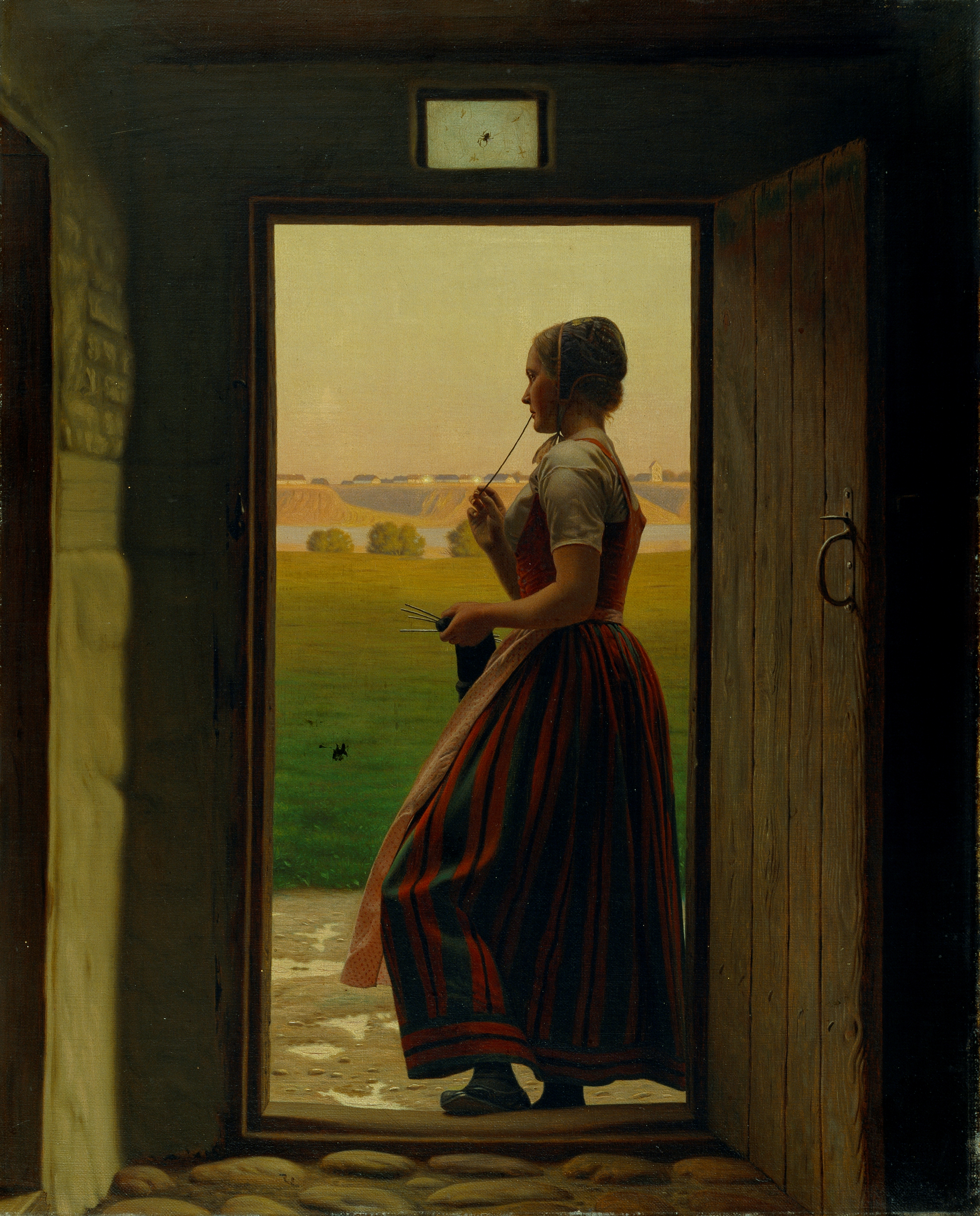
"Surely he will come?". Painting by Christen Dalsgaard. From the Hirschsprung Collection, Denmark.

In the case of uncertainty, expectation is what is considered the most likely to happen. An expectation, which is a belief that is centered on the future, may or may not be realistic. A less advantageous result gives rise to the emotion of disappointment. If something happens that is not at all expected, it is a surprise. An expectation about the behavior or performance of another person, expressed to that person, may have the nature of a strong request, or an order; this kind of expectation is called a social norm. The degree to which something is expected to be true can be expressed using fuzzy logic. Anticipation is the emotion corresponding to expectation.

== Expectations of well-being ==
Richard Lazarus asserts that people become accustomed to positive or negative life experiences which lead to favorable or unfavorable expectations of their present and near-future circumstances. Lazarus notes the widely accepted philosophical principle that "happiness depends on the background psychological status of the person...and cannot be well predicted without reference to one's expectations."

With regard to happiness or unhappiness, Lazarus notes that "people whose objective conditions of life are those of hardship and deprivation often make a positive assessment of their well-being," while "people who are objectively well off...often make a negative assessment of their well-being." Lazarus argues that "the most sensible explanation of this apparent paradox is that people...develop favorable or unfavorable expectations" that guide such assessments.

=== "Response-expectancies" ===
Irving Kirsch, a renowned psychological researcher, writes about "response-expectancies" which are: expectations about non-volitional responses. For example, science commonly takes into account "placebo-effects" when testing for new drugs, against subjects expectations of those drugs: for example, if you expect to receive a drug that may help with depression, and you feel better after taking it, but the drug is just a salt-tablet (better known as a placebo), then the benefit of feeling better (i.e. your non-volitional response), would be based on your expectations rather than any properties of the placebo (i.e. the salt-tablet).

== Expectations impact on beliefs ==
Sociologist Robert K. Merton wrote that a person's expectation is directly linked to self-fulfilling prophecy. Whether or not such an expectation is truthful or not, has little or no effect on the outcome. If a person believes what they are told or convinces himself/herself of the fact, chances are this person will see the expectation to its inevitable conclusion. There is an inherent danger in this kind of labeling especially for the educator. Since children are easily convinced of certain tenets especially when told to them by an authority figure like a parent or teacher, they may believe whatever is taught to them even if what is taught has no factual basis. If the student or child were to act on false information, certain positive or negative unintended consequences could result. If overly positive or elevated expectations were used to describe or manipulate a person's self-image and execution falls short, the results could be a total reversal of that person's self-confidence. If thought of in terms of causality or cause and effect, the higher a person's expectation and the lower the execution, the higher the frustration level may become. This in turn could cause a total cessation of effort and motivate the person to quit.

== Expectations elicitation ==
Expectations are a central part of value calculations in economics. For example, calculating the Subjective expected utility of an outcome requires knowing both the value of an outcome and the probability that it will occur. Researchers who elicit (or measure) the expectations of individuals can input these beliefs into the model in place of standard probabilities. The strategy of eliciting individual expectations is now incorporated into many international surveys, including the Health and Retirement Study in the United States.

Expectations elicitation is used in many domains, including survival and educational outcomes, but may be most prominent in financial realms. Expectations are theoretically important for models such as the Efficient-market hypothesis which suggest that all information should be incorporated into the market, as well as for Modern portfolio theory which suggests that investors must be compensated for higher levels of risk through higher (expected) returns. Following these models, empirical research has found that consumers with more optimistic stock market expectations are more likely to hold riskier assets, and acquire stocks in the near future. Given these promising findings, more recent research in psychology has begun to explore what factors drive consumers' expectations by exploring what factors come to mind when forming stock market expectations.

== See also ==
- Anticipation – Emotion involving pleasure or anxiety in considering or awaiting an expected event
- Belief – Subjective attitude that something is true
- Delusion – Fixation of holding false beliefs
- Descriptive knowledge – Awareness of facts
- Folk psychology – Ordinary explanation and prediction regarding people's behavior and mental state
- Forward-looking statement – Statement in financial report
- Gettier problem – Philosophical problem about what constitutes knowledge
- Observer-expectancy effect – Cognitive bias of experimental subject
- Placebo – Substance or treatment of no therapeutic value
- Prediction – Statement about a future event
- Propositional attitude – Concept in epistemology
- Self-fulfilling prophecy – Prediction that causes itself to become true
- Soft bigotry of low expectations – Political expression describing lowered expectations based on group identity
- Subject-expectancy effect – Behavioural effect
- Surprise (emotion) – Emotional state experienced as the result of an unexpected event
- Suggestibility – Inclination to accept the suggestions of others
- Syncopation – Off-beat rhythm
- Thomas theorem – Sociological theory
- Unintended consequences – Unforeseen outcomes of an action
