= Devil's grandmother =

Folkloric character evoked in curses

The Devil's grandmother (German: Teufels Großmutter; German: [ˈtɔɪ̯fl̩s ˈɡʁoːsˌmʊtɐ]) is a figure in Northern European folk mythology, sometimes a character in folk tales and sometimes an element of folk sayings. Unlike the Devil, she is often portrayed as a sympathetic figure intervening on behalf of mortals. On the other hand, she also can be worse than the Devil.

Originally, in the German-speaking countries the Devil's foremost relative was his mother (German: Teufels Mutter) from the end of the 12th century until the 15th century. Then, he usually was accompanied by Lilith until she was replaced by the Devil's grandmother from the 17th century onwards.

== Depictions in folk tales ==
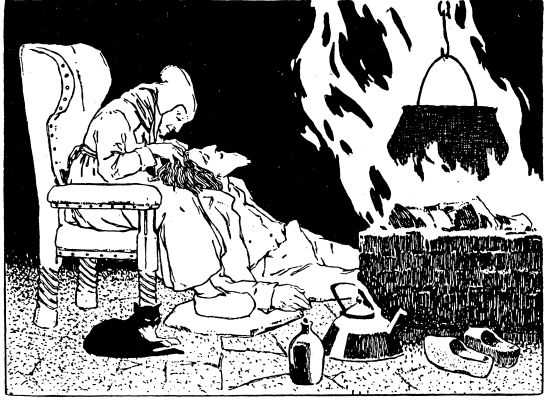
The Devil's grandmother plucking the Devil's three golden hairs.

In the German fairy tale The Devil and his Grandmother as recorded by The Brothers Grimm, she is described only as "very aged woman" who intervenes to help a cursed soldier solve a riddle.

In The Devil with the Three Golden Hairs she also helps a cursed boy by plucking three hairs from the head of the sleeping Devil for him.

In Austria, It is said that the Devil's grandmother let a castle be built in the Danube valley. She then demanded to be venerated divinely. When this did not happen, she sunk her own palace in the river, with only a single tower called Teufelsturm (Devil's tower) remaining. The sunken palace causes swirls and maelstroms in the river endangering ships until the sunken palace is completely destroyed.

In the Bergisches Land, the Devil's grandmother is said to preside over the Witches' Sabbath in the Walpurgis Night and the Midsummer Nights. A passerby will see her sitting on a lustrous throne illuminating the forest, the Devil sitting at her feet. Her appearance is one of youthful beauty, holding a golden apple in her left hand. The Devil's grandmother anoints the gathered witches with water from a golden basin, using a tuft of green ears of corn as her aspergillum. Looking through a pierced copper coin will show the true appearance, though. The Devil's grandmother then appears as exceedingly hideous, holding dirty pig's tails as her aspergillum. Her hair consists of lizards and snakes while mice run out of her mouth and in again over her pointed, bony chin.

== In folk sayings ==
The Devil's grandmother appears in several German folk sayings.

When it rains while the sun is shining, there is a Low German saying de düvel bleket sin möm, i.e. the Devil is bleaching his grandmother. Similarly, in the same situation there is a Swiss saying der Teufel schlägt seine Mutter, i.e. the Devil is beating his mother.

When the wind is making waves in the grain field, there is a Thuringian saying der Teufel peitscht seine Großmutter, i.e. the Devil is whipping his grandmother.

The wood of the alder tree is said to be red because the Devil has beaten his grandmother with it.

== Identification with Old Frick and the goddess Frigg ==
In his "Northern Mythology: Northern mythology.- Vol. 2. Scandinavian popular traditions and superstitions" (1851), Benjamin Thorpe notes that some tales identify Wild Hunt participant Old Frick as "the devil's grandmother" and might be drawn from the same pre-Christian origins as the Norse goddess Frigg.

Adalbert Kuhn and Wilhelm Schwartz in their book Norddeutsche Sagen, Märchen und Gebräuche (North German folk tales, fairy tales, and customs) write about die alte Frick (the old Frick) or alte Fuik (old Fuik) that she is the devil's grandmother, often heard raging around at night. She is accompanied by big dogs which spout fire from mouth and nose when barking. The only way to appease die alte Frick and her dogs when encountering them is feeding flour to the dogs. The flour will be replaced if the flour sacks are left outside at night. In a fairy tale from the Uckermark, die alte Frick is a mighty sorceress and man-eater dwelling in a subterranean cave locked with a door deep in the forest. She behaves similar to the witch in Hansel and Gretel.

== Depiction in film ==
She appears in the Swedish film Häxan in the sabbath scene, where she concocts spells. Her appearance is similar to the traditional depiction of demons, but is covered in fur.

== See also ==
- Grendel's mother
