= The Fish and the Ring =

English fairy tale

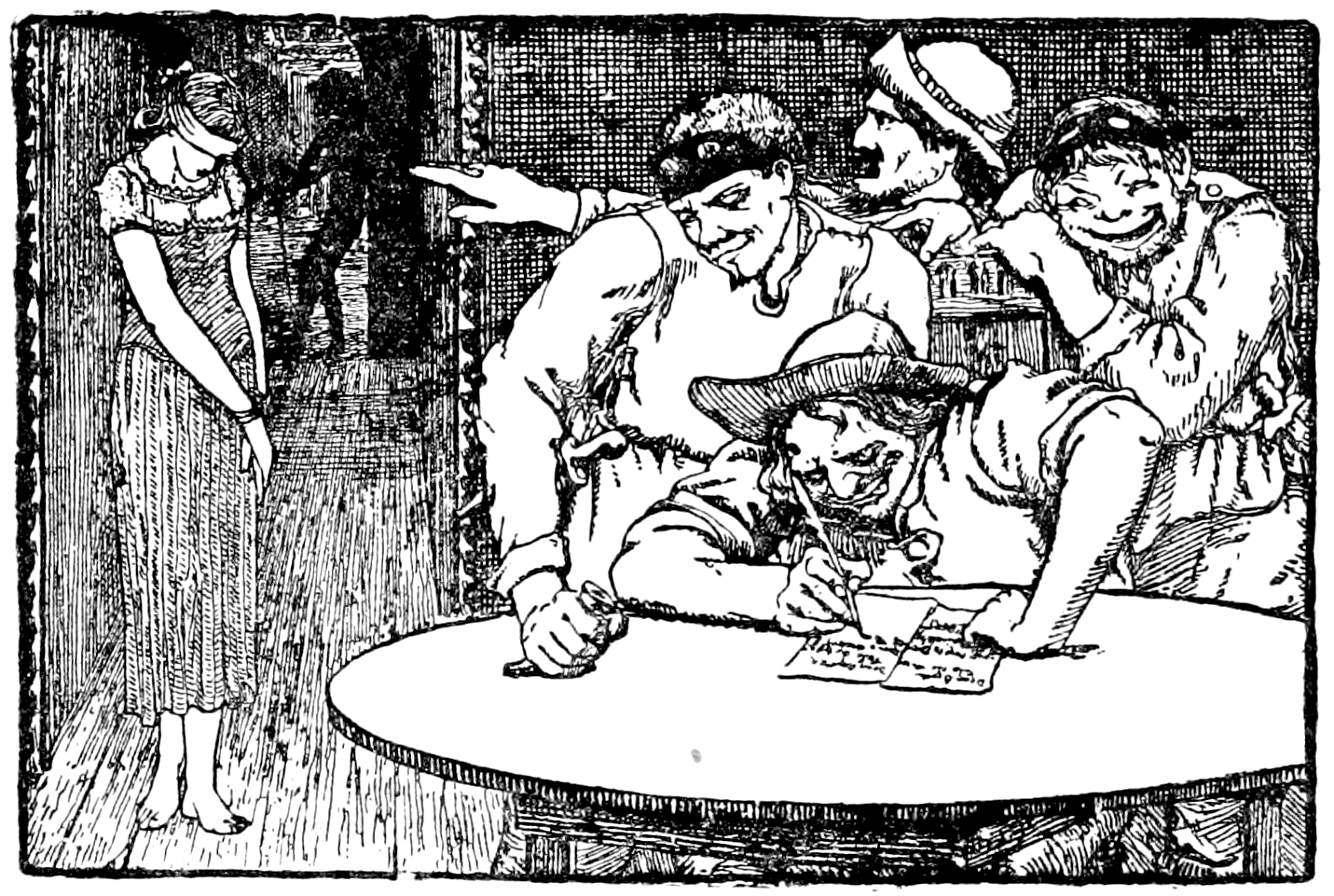
Illustration by John D. Batten

"The Fish and the Ring" is an English fairy tale collected by Joseph Jacobs in English Fairy Tales. This tale has several parallels in the literature and folklore of various cultures.

== Synopsis ==
A baron who was a magician learned that his son was fated to marry a girl born to a poor peasant. He went to that peasant and, when he lamented that he could not feed six children, offered to take the littlest one. He threw her into the river, and she floated to a fisherman's house, and the fisherman raised her. She was beautiful, and one day when the baron was hunting, he saw her and his companion asked whom she would marry. To cast her horoscope, he asked when she was born, and she told her story. He sent her to his brother, with a letter telling his brother to kill her. She fell among robbers, who altered the letter to say she should be married to his son, and his brother had the wedding held at once.

The baron came home and learned this, and took his daughter-in-law for a walk along the cliff. She begged for her life, and he did not push her in, but he threw a golden ring into the sea and told her that she should never show him or his son her face again without the ring. She went off and got work in a kitchen. The baron came to dinner at that house, and she was preparing fish. She found the ring in it. The guests were so taken with the fish that they wanted to meet the cook, and she went with the ring. The baron realised that he could not fight fate, and announced she was his son's true bride and took her back with him to his home, where she lived happily with her husband.

== Variations ==
=== Self-fulfilling prophecy ===
The main plot of the story follows the common fairy tale plot of a child of lowly birth predicted to marry someone of high birth, usually royal. Because of the very actions undertaken to prevent this, the marriage takes place. Other variants include the Russian The Story of Three Wonderful Beggars, the German The Devil With the Three Golden Hairs, and the Indian The King Who Would Be Stronger Than Fate. It is unusual among tales of this type in that the lowly child is a girl; most variants feature a boy of lowly birth and a bride of much higher birth.

While such tales normally include attempts to kill the child in infancy, a letter ordering the child's death altered to order the wedding, and difficult tasks imposed on the child, the specific one of the ring is not common.

=== Returning ring ===
One of the early sources or inspirations, could be the Greek tale of Polycrates or Polykrates, ruler of Samos. According to Herodotus, Polycrates was making a treaty with Amasis the king of Egypt, when Amasis told Polycrates to dispose of some of his most valued possessions, explaining that even he must experience hardships and sorrow, or his life will end in tragedy. Polycrates's, taking Amasis's advice throw away some of his possessions including his most prized, emerald ring. The loss of the ring weighed heavy on Polycrates; one day a fisherman brought a great fish as tribute, and as is the custom, had the fish gutted. When the fish was cut open, Polycrates was surprised and delighted to see his old emerald ring.

The Sanskrit drama of Śakuntalā, as written by Kālidāsa, is also a parallel. A king had fallen in love with Śakuntalā, whom he married and gifted an emerald ring, with his name engraved upon it. However, when he returned to his capital, he forgot about Śakuntalā until one day a fisherman was seen selling such a ring in the marketplace and had been arrested. The fisherman told the king that he had found the ring in the belly of a fish. The king thus remembers Sakúntala and they are reunited.

Another early variant, could be the Talmudic tale of the biblical Solomon, who recovers his signet ring in a similar manner. A similar Talmudic tales is the tale of a wealthy and irreligious man who hearing from an astrologer that all his worldly goods shall one day belong to his neighbour Joseph, a poor and religious man, sold all his wealth and bought a large diamond which he attached onto his turban. One day while trying to cheat the stars again, by leaving his old home he embarked on a ship for a distant port. On the deck a great wind blew, taking his turban and diamond with it into the depth of the sea. Shortly after this event Joseph was preparing his fish for cooking on sabbath eve, when inside the fish's innards he saw a large diamond, all that remained of the wealthy man's riches.

An Irish variation is found in Tain Bo Fraich, in which Ailill gives his daughter Findabair a ring, which she then gives to her lover Fraech, who is hated by Ailill. Ailill discovers the ring among Fraech's things, and throws it into the river, where it is swallowed by a salmon. Fraech sees this, commands a servant to catch the salmon and cook it. When Ailill demands the ring, Findabair sends a servant to deliver the fish with the ring on top. Ailill demands that Fraech tell where the ring came from, and Fraech lies, saying he found it in the salmon and not before. Despite the lie, Fraech and Findabair are able to depart for their own lands.

There are also two somewhat similar tales found in British literature. In Jocelyn's Life of St. Kentigern, King Rederech of Strathclyde discovers Queen Languueth's affair with a soldier, to whom she gave a ring. The king steals the ring from the sleeping soldier, and demands the queen produce the ring in three days or else face death. Languueth confesses her sin to St. Kentigern, better known as St. Mungo, the patron of the city of Glasgow, who then commands a messenger to go fishing in the Clyde; a salmon is caught, gutted, and the ring is found. The queen then produces the ring for the king, and escapes death.

A similar version is found in Elis Gruffudd's Cronicl (16th century), though in this instance the story is attached to Maelgwn Gwynedd, and the queen is innocent, having lost the ring while walking.

Another connected story is one of the Marian miracle stories, dating to no later than the 1200s, about a grocer whom a man is determined to trick. His gives a ring as security to the grocer, secretly steals it, and then demands it from her. He accidentally drops the ring into the river and meanwhile the grocer prays to Mary. The grocer's daughter buys a fish and they find the ring inside.

Another connected story is the Northern German folktale of The Three Gifts. One day three wealthy students find a poor weaver and give him one hundred dollars. The weaver hid the money in some rags; however, his wife sells them to a rag and bone man. The students return to find the weaver poorer than before, and give him another hundred dollars, this time they tell him to be more careful; so the weaver hides it in a dust-tub; however, his wife sells the dust-tub, losing the money a second time. When the students returned a third time they angrily give him a piece of lead stating that they would more foolish than he if they gave him money a third time. One day a fisherman came to the weaver's home, asking if he could use the lead as a weight for his net, promising the weaver the first big fish he catches. The weaver agrees and the fisherman brings him his fish. When gutting the fish the weaver finds a large shining stone and sells it for one thousand dollars making him a wealthy man. There is a near exact cognate of the German tale in an Arabian tale, though the man is a ropemaker, not a weaver.

In Belgium there is the story about the foundation of the Abbaye Notre-Dame d'Orval. According to this, the widowed Mathilda of Tuscany was visiting the site, when she lost her wedding ring in a spring, to her great distress. When she prayed for the return of the ring, a trout appeared on the surface of the water with the ring in its mouth. She exclaimed "Truly this place is a Val d'Or", from which the name "Orval" is derived, and in gratitude made available the funds for the foundation of the monastery here. The abbey arms show the trout and ring. The spring still supplies water to the monastery and its brewery.
