= Baskerville effect =

Claim that superstitious beliefs cause heart attacks

The Baskerville effect, or the Hound of the Baskervilles effect, is the alleged self-fulfilling prophecy that there is an increase in rate of mortality through heart attacks on days considered unlucky because of the psychological stress this causes on superstitious people. The term derives from the Sherlock Holmes novel The Hound of the Baskervilles in which a hellish-looking dog chases Sir Charles Baskerville, sufferer of a chronic heart disease. According to legend, the dog cursed his family, Baskerville runs in great fear and dies of a heart attack "with an expression of horror in his face".

== Origin of the term ==
The Baskerville effect was named by David Phillips and his colleagues at the University of California, San Diego, on a paper where they reported that the daily number of deaths of Chinese and Japanese Americans from heart attacks between 1973 and 1998 was 7 percent higher on the fourth of the month compared to the average for the other days in that month, while this was not observed in the general American population.

Four (四, formal writing: 肆, pinyin si4) is considered an unlucky number in Chinese, and hence in the Japanese and Korean, because it sounds like "death" (死 pinyin si3). Some Chinese and Japanese hotels and hospitals do not use it as a room number (the way that American architects don't use 13 as a floor number in office or hotel buildings). The authors, seeing how telephone line subscribers could choose the last four digits in their telephone numbers, found evidence that the number 4 is avoided among Chinese and Japanese Americans by searching the California Yellow Pages for telephone numbers of Chinese and Japanese restaurants, and finding that these had significantly fewer numbers 4 in this last section (366 out of 4748, or 7.71 percent) than it would be expected by chance (10 percent), a pattern not observed on restaurants listed as American. An analysis of the 20,000 computerized death certificates of Asian-Americans in San Diego, Phillips discovered that there was a 13 percent uptick in death rates on the fourth of the month. The hypothesis was that the peak was caused by stress induced by the superstition surrounding this number.

== Criticism, attempted replication and refutation ==
In 2002, Gary Smith commented that Phillips and colleagues had omitted data from several heart disease categories, picking only those that happened to have a higher rate on the fourth day, calling them "chronic heart diseases". Smith also pointed out that they had not done this on their previous studies of Jewish deaths near Passover and Chinese deaths near the Harvest Moon, where they had used all heart disease categories.

Smith also found no statistically relevant peaks on day 4 in data from 1969–1988 and 1999–2001 for total coronary deaths, inpatients, or the subset of heart diseases used by Phillips and colleagues, adding that there were more deaths on day 5 in the 1969–1988 data, and more deaths on day 3 in the 1999–2001 data.

In 2003, Nirmal Panesar and colleagues looked for this effect on the Chinese population of Hong Kong. They looked at mortality data from 1995 to 2000, comparing the days of the month with "deathly connotations" (4, 14 and 24) with the other days of the month on both the Lunar and Gregorian calendars, and found no statistically significant difference.

In early 2018, Jonathan Jarry analysed this phenomenon, citing both Smith's and Panesar et al's papers, pointing out that, if the effect was real, a bigger effect would be seen in Asia, while the opposite occurs. Jarry states that the peak observed on the original study appears because of what the researchers decided to compare it to, and quotes cardiologist Christopher Labos as concluding that "while the number of deaths on day 4 may be higher than average, it is not actually statistically higher than any individual day."
