= The Devil with the Three Golden Hairs =

German fairy tale

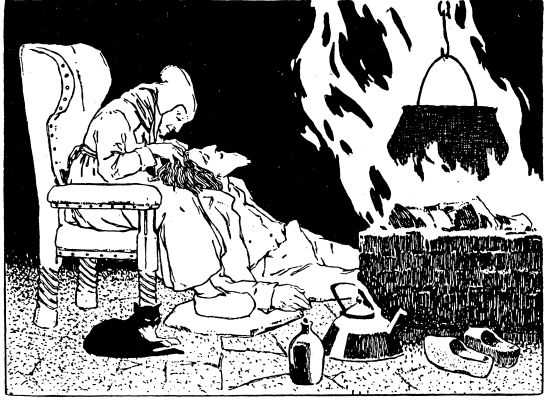
- The grandmother plucks the hairs from the devil's head. Illustration by Otto Ubbelohde.

Folk tale
- Name: The Devil with the Three Golden Hairs
- Aarne–Thompson grouping: ATU 930 (The Prophecy; Poor Boy shall marry Rich Girl); ATU 461 (Three Hairs of the Devil)
- Region: Germany
- Published in: Kinder- und Hausmärchen, by the Brothers Grimm
- Related: The King Who Would Be Stronger Than Fate

"The Devil with the Three Golden Hairs" (German: Der Teufel mit den drei goldenen Haaren) is a German fairy tale collected by the Brothers Grimm (KHM 29). It falls under Aarne–Thompson classification types 461 ("three hairs from the devil"), and 930 ("prophecy that a poor boy will marry a rich girl").

The story was first translated into English as "The Giant and the Three Golden Hairs" to avoid offense, but the devil in the story does indeed act like a folklore giant. Ruth Manning-Sanders included it, as "The Three Golden Hairs of the King of the Cave Giants", in A Book of Giants.

== Synopsis ==
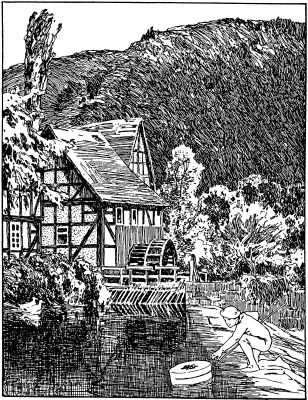
The miller finds the box floating in the water. Illustration by Otto Ubbelohde.

A poor woman gives birth to a son with a caul (where the amniotic sac is still intact at birth), which is interpreted to mean that he would marry the king's daughter at fourteen years of age. The wicked king, hearing of it, visits the family and persuades them to allow him to bring the boy back and raise him in the castle. Instead, he puts the boy in a box and throws the box into the water so that he will drown and not grow up to marry his daughter. But rather than sink, it drifts down to a mill, where it is found by the miller and his wife. The two decide to raise the boy on their own.

Fourteen years later, the king happens to visit the mill inadvertently. Upon seeing the boy, the king asks the miller if he was his father, who then explains the story of how he and his wife had come to raise the boy. Shocked, the king devises a way to rid himself of the boy once and for all. He gives the young man a sealed letter and instructs him to deliver it to the queen. Inside, the letter commands that the boy be killed and buried once he arrives.

On his way to deliver the letter, the boy seeks shelter in an old woman's house for the night. Despite her warnings that robbers frequent the house, the boy falls asleep, claiming he can walk no further. When the bandits arrive, they read the letter and take pity on the boy. Without waking him, they put a new letter in its place, dictating that the boy should marry the king's daughter upon his arrival. When the morning comes, they point him in the direction of the castle and he goes on his way.

The queen, who has obeyed the letter's instructions and proceeded with wedding celebrations, is interrupted by the king's return. In exasperation, the king calculates an impossible task to rid himself of his new son-in-law; instructing the boy to travel into Hell and return with three of the Devil's golden hairs.

The boy is confronted with three questions on his journey, as he travels between two towns and across the river. When passing through each, he is asked his trade ("what he knows"). The boy responds thrice "I know everything." He is then asked why the first town's well, which once sprung forth wine, no longer dispenses even water. In the second town, he is asked why a tree that once produced golden apples will not even sprout leaves. When being ferried across the river, the ferryman asks him why he must always row back and forth, and is not free to do otherwise. To each question he replies "You shall know that, only when I come back."

The boy finds the entrance to Hell on the other side of the river and, upon entering, finds only the Devil's grandmother. He tells her what he wants, and she promises to assist him how she can, turning him into an ant and hiding him in the folds of the clothing. The Devil returns and, despite smelling human flesh in the air, is convinced to sit down, eat, and drink. Once he has done so, he lays his head in his grandmother's lap and falls into an inebriated sleep. She plucks a golden hair from his head three times, causing him to awaken after every hair pulled. Having assumed the pain was part of his dreams, he recounts his visions to his grandmother - a dried-up well in a town square with a toad underneath blocking the flow of liquid, a tree that does not sprout fruit or leaves because of a mouse gnawing at its root, and a ferryman who can be freed merely by placing his oar in the hands of another man on the river's bank.

The next morning, once the Devil has left the dwelling again, the boy is transformed back into his former self. Thanking the old woman, he takes the three golden hairs and sets off for home. Once again, he passes the river and two cities, disclosing the answers he had overheard the Devil speak of during the night. Each town gives him a pair of donkeys laden with gold, which he brings back with him to the castle. The king, pleased by the boy's return with such wealth, allows him to live in peace with his wife. He inquires on the source of the wealth he acquired, hoping to find some for himself. The boy tells him the gold was found across the river.

The story ends with the king crossing the river with the ferryman, who hands him the oar upon reaching the other side, condemning him to a life of ferrying travellers back and forth forever.

== Analysis ==
=== Tale types ===
Folklorist Stith Thompson commented that the first part of the tale (birth of boy predestined to marry princess/rich girl), classified as ATU 930, is often found coupled together with the second part, the impossible task of getting the hair from the Devil (or giant, ogre, etc.).

Scholar Kurt Ranke stated that the tale type was a European combination of "two very old stories": the "child of fate" that appears as early as the 3rd century CE in Indian and Chinese literature, associated with the motif K978 ("Uriah letter"); and the hero's journey to the other world bearing questions, a narrative contained in the Avadana and in the Tutinama. Scholars Antti Aarne and Václav Tille, as cited by Thompson, concluded that both stories were separate tales that combined into one narrative in Europe – a similar assessment made by folklorists Johannes Bolte and Jiří Polívka, in their notes to the Grimm's tales.

==== ATU 930: The Prophecy ====
According to Thompson and Tille, tale type 930 shows 4 literary redactions: Indic (the oldest), Ethiopic, Western European and Turkish. In European tradition, the theme appears in the Middle Ages: in Godfrey of Viterbo (12th century); in Gesta Romanorum, with the story of the king and the forester's son; and in Le dit de l'empereur Constant (13th century).

Professor Dov Noy stated that type 930 is "well known" in Eastern Europe.

==== ATU 461: Three Hairs from the Devil's Beard ====
Thompson stated that the tale type appears "all over Europe" and in Asia (China).

Willem de Blécourt registers that the tale Li sette palommelle ("The Seven Doves"), in the Pentamerone, shows as its second part the heroine's quest to a creature named Chronos, the one who can give her the answers to rescue her brothers. He states that this sequence, "The Three Questions", was "incorporated" into the tale type "in late 18th century".

In this tale type, after the lowly hero marries the princess, her father sends him to the Devil or another creature, on a dangerous quest designed to kill him. On his way to the other world, he is asked riddles and questions that he promises to ask the Devil. In many variants, the three questions pertain to a fountain that has dried up, a tree that does not yield fruits, and lastly about the ferryman.

=== Motifs ===
The motif of the old man ferrying the poor boy/hero across the sea to the Devil (in Grimm's version; a giant, ogre, in other variants) parallels the mythological journey to "The Otherworld" (Hell) on the boat. Likewise, the figure of the devil fulfills the role of an oracular god.

The motif of frogs blocking the flow of waters has several parallels studied by Andrew Lang. Lang suggests this motif may descend from the ancient Indo-European myth of a hero or thunder god slaying a serpent or dragon that blocks the flow of waters.

=== Variants ===
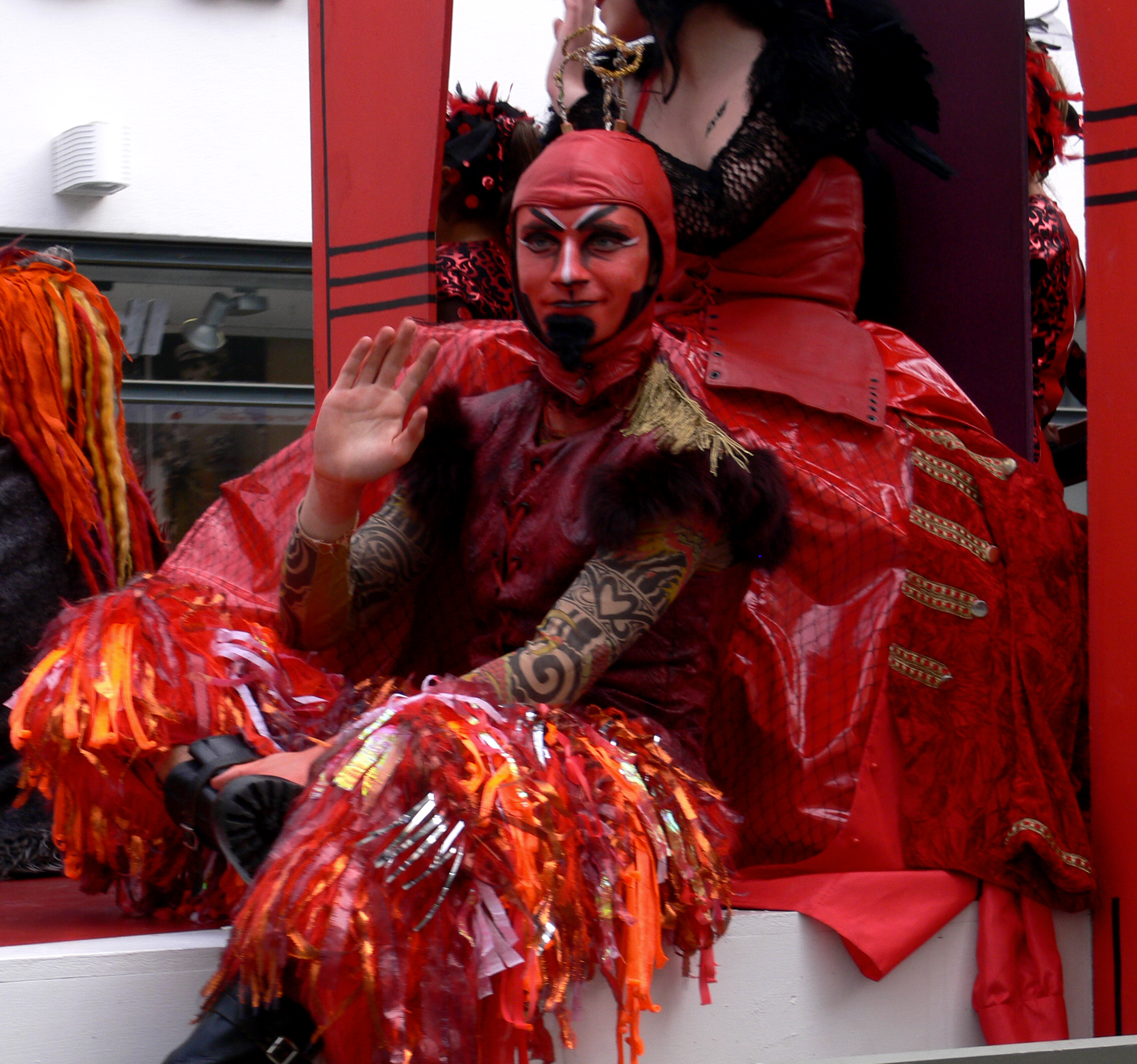
The devil with three golden hairs, Rutentheater 2010

In the story Emperor Conrad and the count's son (Gesta Romanorum), the protagonist is the son of the Count of Caln, who had offended Emperor Conrad II and thus fled to a hut in the Black Forest. The boy is adopted by Duke Herman of Swabia. When Conrad sent the youth to Aachen with a letter instructing the empress to kill him, it was the dean of the Speyer Cathedral who save the young count and changed the instruction, so Caln could marry the princess. When Conrad found out, he became reconciled with the events and made the count, now his son-in-law his co-regent. Because the dean had prevented innocent blood to be shed, he was made chancellor and it was also because of this action, the imperial burial vault was constructed in Speyer.

The Brothers Grimm collected a tale in the first edition of their compilation with the name Der Vogel Phönix (English: "The Phoenix Bird"), where the hero was found by a miller in a box cast into the water and he is tasked with getting three feathers from the "Phoenix Bird", who lives in a hut atop a mountain in the company of an old lady.

In Slavic folktale compilations, the devil is replaced by a character called Old Vsevede or "Father Know-All".

Francis Hindes Groome collected a Transylvanian-Romani variant with the title The Three Golden Hairs of the Sun-King: the charcoal-maker's son is prophesied by three ladies in white to marry the king's daughter. The king tries to get rid of his prospective son-in-law, but he is saved and named "Nameless". Then he is tasked with getting three hairs from Sun-King, an entity that becomes a little child in the morning, a man by midday and at night comes home as a grey man.

In a South Slavic variant collected in Kordun and published in 1927, the hero is a soldier, the antagonist is his captain and the rower who never rests his oar is a sentry holding a gun. Croatian folklorist Maja Bošković-Stulli suggested that this variant may have been influenced by the military-like way of life in the Military Frontier.

In a Georgian variant translated into Hungarian with the title A megkövült fiú ("The Boy of Stone"), a king and queen have a son they love so much, they try to protect him from the evils of the world by locking him in a tower. Time passes, and the boy opens his window and sees the sun, and becomes fascinated by it. One day, the prince yawns at the sun, which he takes to be an offense, but tolerates it. Some time later, the sun curses the prince to be a stone by day, and normal by night. The prince meets a woman and fathers a son, but becomes stone permanently. His son grows up in hours. On one occasion, he asks his mother about his father and is told of the situation. So, he decides to visit the mother of the day to know if he can revert the curse on his father. On his journey, he is asked questions: why the harvesters cannot plow the land, why the shepherds' flocks of sheep are dying, and how the stag can shed its antlers. The youth promises to consult the mother of the day for answers.

== Influence ==
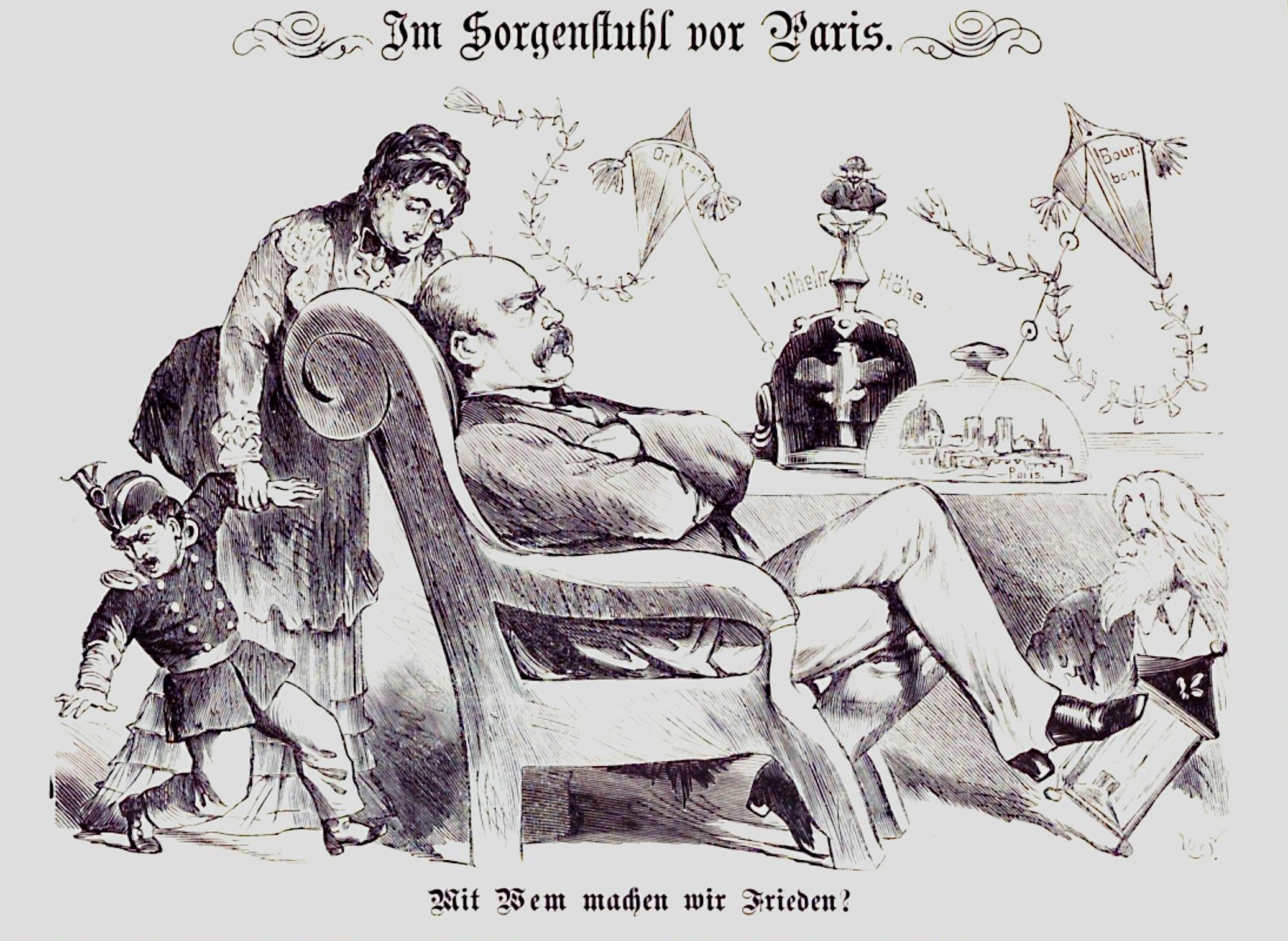
Bismarck with three hairs, caricature in Kladderadatsch 1870

"The Devil with The Three Golden Hairs" is noted to have been one of many possible influences for J. R. R. Tolkien's The Tale of Beren and Lúthien, in which the elf-king Thingol sets an impossible task for his daughter's mortal suitor: to obtain one of the three Silmarils from the Iron Crown of Morgoth.

== See also ==
- The Devil and His Grandmother
- The King Who Would Be Stronger Than Fate
- The Story of Three Wonderful Beggars
- The Fish and the Ring

== Sources ==
- Aarne, Antti. Der reiche Mann und sein Schwiegersohn. Vergleichende Märchenforschungen. FFC 23. Hamina: Suomalaisen Tiedeakatemian Kustantama, 1916.
- Čechová, Mariana (2018). "Opowieściowy wzór Przeznaczenia bohaterów” [The novel-related pattern of protagonists’ destiny]. In: Slavia Occidentalis, nr 74/2 (grudzień), 65–76. https://doi.org/10.14746/so.2017.74.23.
- Čechová, Marianna, and Simona Klimkova. 2020. “Intercultural Connections in Archetypal Stories Concerning the Protagonist's Predestination”. In: Studi Slavistici 16 (2): 77–89. https://doi.org/10.13128/Studi_Slavis-7474.
- Tille, Václav. "Das Märchen vom Schicksalskind". In: Zeitschrift des Vereins für Volkskunde. 29. Jahrgang (1919): 22–40.
