= Bootstrapping (law) =

Rule of evidence in American courts

The bootstrapping rule in the rules of evidence dealt with admissibility as non-hearsay of statements of conspiracy in United States federal courts. The rule, in a criminal prosecution for conspiracy, was that the court, in deciding whether to allow the jury to consider a statement of conspiracy, cannot hear the statement itself: the allegation had to be supported by independent evidence.

If the independent evidence convinced the court that a conspiracy probably existed, only then could such a statement be introduced into trial and heard by the jury. Allowing such statements of conspiracy to prove the existence of conspiracy was considered similar to bootstrapping. In the United States, the bootstrapping rule has been eliminated from the Federal Rules of Evidence, as decided by the Supreme Court in the Bourjaily case.

For example, if a person is charged with four crimes, unless the evidence is connectable to each crime, each piece of evidence can be used only in each separate crime and not to link any crime to another.

In law, bootstrapping can also refer to an attempt to gain jurisdiction over a non-jurisdictional matter by its circuitous relationship to a jurisdictional matter.

In 1987 the Supreme Court determined that the "bootstrapping" rule did not survive the adoption of the Federal Rules of Evidence.
