= Copycat Killer (disambiguation) =

Copycat Killer is a remix extended play by American singer-songwriter Phoebe Bridgers.

Copycat Killer may also refer to:

- A copycat crime
- Copycat Killer, a 2002 Japanese film by Yoshimitsu Morita
- Copycat Killer (TV series), a 2023 Taiwanese television series
- CopyCat Killers, an American documentary-style television series
