= Soft bigotry of low expectations =

Political expression describing lowered expectations based on group identity

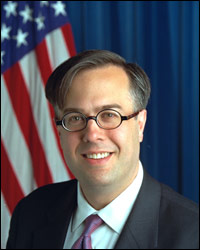
Michael Gerson, who coined the phrase as a speechwriter for George W. Bush

The "soft bigotry of low expectations" is an expression describing the discriminatory practice of holding lower expectations for individuals or groups based on characteristics such as race or socioeconomic status, and its potential for harm to the people in question. It is most commonly used in discussions of education, public policy and civil rights. The phrase was popularized by George W. Bush during his 1999 presidential campaign and is generally credited to his chief speechwriter, Michael Gerson.

The phrase refers to the belief that lowering expectations for individuals or groups because of characteristics such as race, ethnicity, poverty, disability or other forms of disadvantage constitutes a subtle form of prejudice. It argues that applying lower standards out of sympathy, paternalism, or assumptions about capability can deny individuals equal opportunity by reinforcing stereotypes and limiting achievement. The expression is most commonly applied in education, where it refers to teachers, administrators, or policymakers holding lower academic expectations for certain groups and adjusting standards or outcomes accordingly.

== Origins ==
Some say it is unfair to hold disadvantaged children to rigorous standards. I say it is discrimination to require anything less, the soft bigotry of low expectations.

— George W. Bush, speech to the Latin Business Association, September 1999

The expression entered American political discourse during George W. Bush's 2000 United States presidential election. The phrase was coined by Bush's chief speechwriter, Michael Gerson, and popularized by Bush during his first presidential campaign. The phrase referred to the belief that expecting less of individuals because of their race or background is a subtle but harmful form of prejudice. In September 1999, then Texas Governor Bush used the phrase in a speech to the Latin Business Association, arguing that all children were capable of learning regardless of their family background or socioeconomic circumstances. Rejecting lower academic standards for disadvantaged students, he contended that poverty, family circumstances and ethnicity should not determine educational achievement and that schools should maintain high expectations for all students.

Bush reiterated the phrase in a speech to the NAACP on 10 July 2000, arguing that educational inequality persisted in part because schools expected less of disadvantaged and minority students. He pledged to confront what he called "the soft bigotry of low expectations", asserting that equal opportunity required equal academic expectations. Following his election, Bush repeatedly invoked the phrase while promoting the No Child Left Behind Act, arguing that schools should be held accountable for ensuring that all students met measurable academic standards regardless of background. Since its introduction in 2000, the phrase has remained a prominent part of American political vocabulary and has been discussed extensively in political commentary and academic literature, particularly in debates over education reform, affirmative action, diversity initiatives, and social policy, and continues to be used today.

== Political usage ==
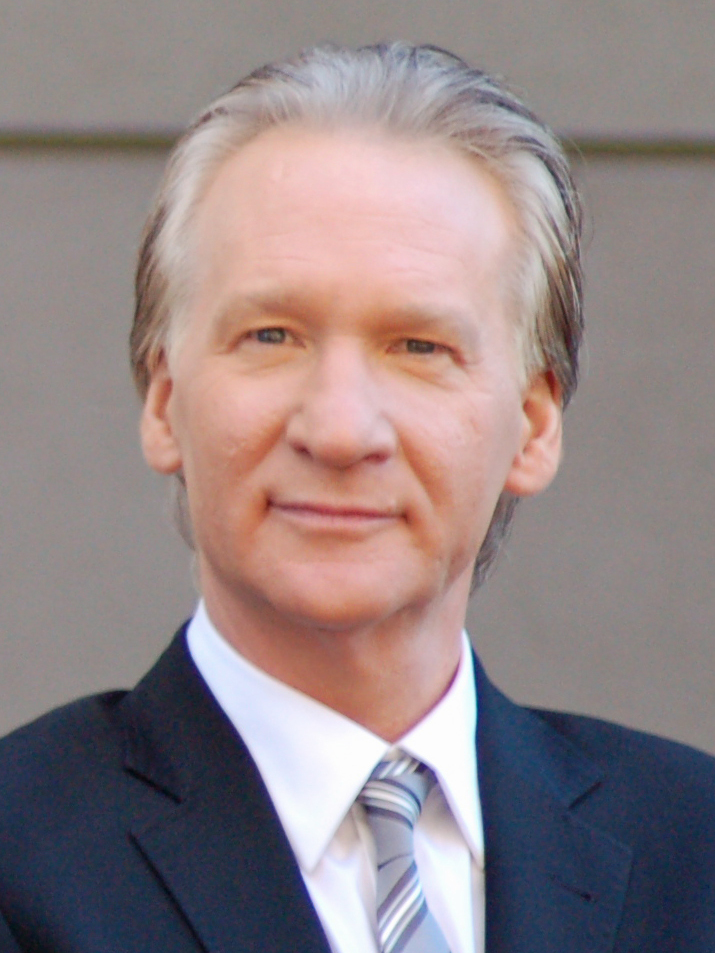
Bill Maher, who occasionally used the expression on Real Time with Bill Maher.

Following the Charlie Hebdo attack in January 2015, comedian and political commentator Bill Maher invoked the phrase during an interview discussing reactions to Islamist extremism. Maher argued that some Western commentators held Muslims to different standards than adherents of other religions, describing this as an example of "the soft bigotry of low expectations". Following the death of Abdullah of Saudi Arabia in 2015, Maher again used the expression while criticising Western leaders' praise of the king as a moderate. He argued that describing Abdullah as a reformer despite Saudi Arabia's restrictions on women and its use of public executions reflected what he called the "soft bigotry of low expectations" toward Muslims and Muslim-majority countries.

In a 2015 commentary for the Cato Institute, economist Michael Tanner argued that former Florida governor Jeb Bush's proposals to address poverty echoed George W. Bush's opposition to the "soft bigotry of low expectations". Tanner wrote that Bush's emphasis on educational opportunity, school choice, employment, and family stability reflected the view that low-income students should be held to the same academic expectations as others rather than being judged by lower standards.

In 2016, Australian lawyer and Indigenous leader Noel Pearson argued that the concept is applicable to Indigenous Australians and other disadvantaged groups. He contended that "the soft bigotry of low expectations" had become a greater barrier to social progress than overt discrimination by encouraging lower standards and diminished expectations for marginalized communities. Pearson argued that effective teaching and high educational expectations are essential to overcoming educational disadvantage. He also argued that policies prioritising structural explanations for disadvantage over individual agency discouraged economic development and educational reform, and that opposition to initiatives such as Direct Instruction reflected an unwillingness to hold disadvantaged students to the same standards as others. Pearson further criticised sections of the Australian media, particularly the Australian Broadcasting Corporation, for opposing reforms aimed at improving Indigenous educational and social outcomes.

According to commentator J. Pharoah Doss from the New Pittsburgh Courier, presidential speechwriter Michael Gerson coined the phrase "the soft bigotry of low expectations" to describe what he characterized as lower expectations held by some White progressives toward Black Americans because of the historical effects of racism and poverty. Doss argued that this concept was reflected in some commentary during the early stages of the Black Lives Matter movement, where, he contended, some columnists expressed support for the movement despite acknowledging that they did not fully understand its aims. He argued that such support exemplified the "soft bigotry of low expectations" by, in his view, treating Black activists differently from other political movements. Doss cited freelance writer Jeff Charles, who wrote that "assuming that Blacks are not able to overcome racism in the 21st century is every bit as racist as Richard Spencer arguing that Whites are superior by virtue of their race", adding that the "bigotry of low expectations" is more difficult to recognize because it is "concealed behind a facade of political correctness".

In a 2020 analysis for NBC News, political journalist Alex Seitz-Wald argued that President Donald Trump had created low public expectations of Democratic presidential nominee Joe Biden by repeatedly portraying him as mentally diminished and incapable. Seitz-Wald argued that this strategy risked benefiting Biden during the presidential debates, as merely meeting ordinary performance standards could be perceived as exceeding expectations, drawing a parallel with the concept of the "soft bigotry of low expectations". In a 2026 analysis of the Munich Security Conference, European Council on Foreign Relations director Mark Leonard described European relief at the comparatively conciliatory tone of U.S. Secretary of State Marco Rubio's speech as "a classic example of the soft bigotry of low expectations". Leonard argued that minimal gestures toward the transatlantic relationship were being praised despite the speech's broader criticism of Europe and endorsement of the Trump administration's worldview.

== Interpretation and criticism ==
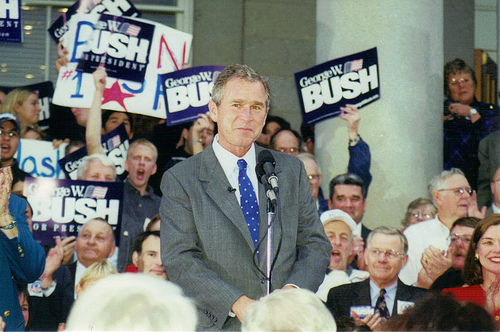
George W. Bush campaigning in New Hampshire during the 2000 United States presidential election, in which he popularized the phrase.

Supporters have argued that the concept emphasizes maintaining consistently high expectations for all students regardless of background, contending that doing so promotes equal treatment and social mobility. The phrase became closely associated with standards-based education reform during the Bush administration. Critics have argued that the expression oversimplifies educational inequality by emphasizing expectations while giving insufficient attention to structural factors such as poverty, school funding and systemic discrimination. Some scholars have also argued that the phrase has been employed rhetorically to oppose policies intended to address educational disparities. Australian lawyer Noel Pearson argued that "hard bigotry" is characterised by overt prejudice and discrimination, which he associated with the political right, whereas "soft bigotry" is a subtler form of bias that he associated with the political left.

In a 2016 opinion article for the Connecticut Mirror, education advocate Jennifer Alexander argued that research on teacher expectations illustrated the "soft bigotry of low expectations" in education. Citing a Johns Hopkins University study, she contended that lower expectations among some teachers toward students of color contributed to disparities in educational outcomes and argued that increasing teacher diversity and improving cultural competency training would help address those disparities while maintaining high expectations for all students. In a 2019 paper, mathematics education scholars Laurie Rubel and Andrea McCloskey argued that the phrase, popularized during George W. Bush's presidency, has been used to frame educational inequality primarily as a consequence of low expectations while downplaying broader structural factors such as systemic racism. They contended that the concept has been employed in debates over mathematics education to criticize equity-focused teaching approaches and to support standardized testing, accountability policies, and meritocratic conceptions of education.

In a 2020 opinion column, educator Ian Rowe from USA Today argued that some anti-racist educational policies risked creating a modern form of the "soft bigotry of low expectations" by attributing disparities in academic outcomes primarily to systemic racism rather than maintaining uniform academic standards. He contended that lowering expectations or grading standards for disadvantaged students ultimately harmed those students and advocated policies that combined high expectations with greater educational opportunity and school choice. A 2023 study by Larissa Malone, Vilma Seeberg, and Xiaoqi Yu examined the perceptions of high-achieving Black students and their parents regarding teacher expectations in a school district with diversity and inclusion initiatives. Using Critical Race Theory as its analytical framework, the study found that participants perceived teachers and school authorities as holding unjustly low expectations of Black students, which the authors argued reinforced racial hierarchies and anti-Black bias. The authors concluded that educators should be more aware of how their expectations are perceived and address both individual and institutional forms of racial inequality.

In 2024, former UK schools minister Baroness Barran invoked the phrase during debates over the Labour government's curriculum and assessment review. She argued that proposed reforms should avoid the "soft bigotry of low expectations" by maintaining high academic standards for disadvantaged pupils and warned against shifting emphasis from knowledge-based learning and rigorous assessment toward skills-based approaches. In a 2026 opinion article, journalist Naomi Schaefer Riley argued that policies limiting the use of remedial coursework in California community colleges reflected "the soft bigotry of low expectations". She contended that promoting academically underprepared students into college-level courses without adequate foundational skills contributed to poor academic outcomes, and argued that efforts to reduce educational disparities should focus on ensuring students master core subjects before graduation rather than lowering academic standards or eliminating remedial education.

== See also ==
- Expectation
- Pygmalion effect
- Self-fulfilling prophecy
- Stereotype threat
- No Child Left Behind Act
- Achievement gap in the United States
