= Copycat effect =

Copycat effect may refer to:

- Copycat crimes, crimes inspired by or replicating another crime
- Copycat suicide, suicide inspired by or replicating another's suicide

== See also ==
- Copycat (disambiguation)
