= Robert Rosenthal (psychologist) =

German-born American psychologist (1933–2024)

- Born: March 2, 1933; Gießen, Hesse, Germany
- Died: January 5, 2024 (aged 90); Riverside, California, U.S.
- Education: University of California, Los Angeles
- Awards: James McKeen Cattell Fellow Award (2001)
- Scientific career
- Fields: Psychology
- Workplaces: University of California, Riverside
- Thesis: An Attempt at the Experimental Induction of the Defense Mechanism of Projection (1956)
- Doctoral advisor: Bruno Klopfer

Robert Rosenthal (March 2, 1933 – January 5, 2024) was a German-born American psychologist who was a Distinguished Professor of Psychology at the University of California, Riverside. His interests included self-fulfilling prophecies, which he explored in a well-known study of the Pygmalion effect: the effect of teachers' expectations on students.

== Biography ==
Rosenthal was born in Gießen, Hesse, on March 2, 1933, and left Germany with his family at the age of six and arrived in the U.S. in 1940. In 1956, he was awarded a PhD by the University of California, Los Angeles. He started his career as a clinical psychologist and then moved into social psychology. From 1962 to 1999 he taught at Harvard, became chairman of the psychology department there in 1992, and Edgar Pierce Professor of Psychology in 1995. On retiring from Harvard in 1999, he went to California.

Much of his work has focused on nonverbal communication, particularly its influence on expectations: for example, in doctor-patient or manager-employee situations. The many awards he has won include the 2003 Gold Medal Award for Life Achievement in the Science of Psychology from the American Psychological Association and election to the American Academy of Arts and Sciences. Rosenthal won the AAAS Prize for Behavioral Science Research in 1960. In 2008 he became a university professor in the University of California statewide system. A survey in the Review of General Psychology, published in 2002, ranked Rosenthal as the 84th most cited psychologist of the 20th century.

Rosenthal died of an aneurysm in Riverside, California, on January 5, 2024, at the age of 90.

== Publications ==
- Rosenthal, Robert (1979), "The "File Drawer Problem" and the Tolerance for Null Results", Psychological Bulletin, 86 (3): 638–641, doi:10.1037/0033-2909.86.3.638, S2CID 36070395
- Rosenthal, R. & Jacobson, L. (1992). Pygmalion in the classroom, Expanded edition. New York: Irvington.

== Sources ==
- University Biography
- American Psychological Foundation
- List of Rosenthal's appointments, awards etc.
