= List of World War II aces from New Zealand =

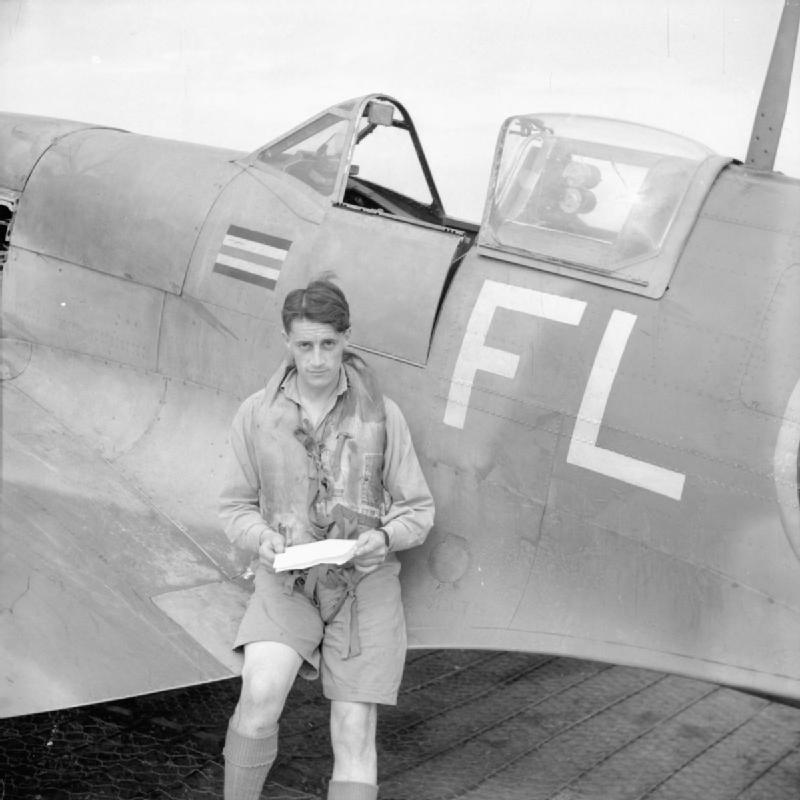
Colin Gray, top-scoring New Zealand ace of World War II, with his Supermarine Spitfire in the Middle East, 1943

This is a list of fighter aces in World War II from New Zealand. An "ace" is generally considered to be any pilot who has downed five or more enemy aircraft. Historians have gleaned figures from combat reports, unit histories, personnel records, and award citations, which sometimes recorded the pilot's tally of victories at the time the decoration was recommended. The top-scoring New Zealand ace of World War II, Colin Gray, is generally credited with 28 victories, that is 27 solo "kills" and two shared. Records were also kept for the shooting down of V-1 flying bombs, with the most successful New Zealander being Arthur Umbers, who is credited with destroying 28 V-1s, in addition to 4 solo aerial victories and one shared.

== List ==
Name	Victories	Others	Awards	Notes
Robert Hamish "Jimmy" Balfour	4 & 1 shared	-	DFC	
Minden Vaughan "Mindy" Blake	10 & 3 shared	-	DSO, DFC	Served in the Royal Air Force. Flew in Battle of Britain, POW 19 August 1942.
Robert Duff Bremner	0 & 3 shared	7 V-1s	DFC	
Stanley Franklin Browne	5 & 1 shared	-	DFC*	
Charles Roy Bush	3 & 1 shared	-	DFC	Served in the Royal Air Force. Also 2 probables. Flew in Battle of Britain, KIFA 30 November 1948.
Raymond Cammock	0	20 & 1 shared V-1s	DFC	KIA 6 October 1944.
Brian John George Carbury	15 & 2 shared	-	DFC*	Also 2 probables. Served in the Royal Air Force. Flew in Battle of Britain, achieved "ace in a day" status by shooting down five aircraft on 31 August 1940. (Note: The term "ace in a day" is used to designate a pilot who has shot down five or more airplanes in a single day, based on usual definition of a "flying ace".)
Donald C. Carlson	3 & 2 shared	-	DFC	Also 2 probables.
Hansford Ward Chambers	7 & 1 shared	-	DFC	
John "Johnny" Milne Checketts	16	-	DSO, DFC	Also 2 probables. Total includes 2 V-1s.
Wilfred Greville Clouston	9 & 3 shared	-	DFC	Also 1 probable and 1 shared probable. Served in the Royal Air Force. Flew in Battle of Britain, POW February 1942.
Basil Gordon "Buck" Collyns	5 & 2 shared	-	DFC	Also 1 probable. Served in the Royal Air Force. Flew in Battle of Britain, KIA 20 August 1944.
William Vernon Crawford-Compton	20 & 1 shared	-	DSO*, DFC*	Also 3 probables and 1 shared probable. Served in the Royal Air Force.
James Roy Cullen	0	16 V-1s	DFC*	POW 4 May 1945.
Raymond Jack Danzey	0	11 V-1s	DFC	
Alan Christopher "Al" Deere	17 & 1 shared	-	DSO, DFC*	Also 4 probables. Served in the Royal Air Force. Flew in Battle of Britain.
Antonio Simmons Dini	5 & 2 shared	-		Also 3 probables. Served in the Royal Air Force. KIFA 31 May 1940.
Eric Steele "Francis" Doherty	7	-	DFM, DFC (US)	
Owen David "Ginger" Eagleson	2 & 1 shared	20 V-1s	DFC	POW 2 May 1945.
Geoffrey Bryson Fisken	11	-	DFC	Also 1 probable. Highest scoring flying ace of the Commonwealth against the Japanese in the South Pacific.
John Albert Axel Gibson	12 & 1 shared	-	DSO, DFC	Served in the Royal Air Force. Flew in Battle of Britain, also in South Pacific with RNZAF.
Reginald Joseph Cowan Grant	7 & 1 shared	-	DFM, DFC*	Also 1 probable. KIA 28 February 1944.
Colin Falkland Gray	27 & 2 shared	-	DSO, DFC**	Also 6 probables. Served in the Royal Air Force. Flew in Battle of Britain, highest scoring New Zealand flying ace of WWII.
Bevan Mason Hall	0	7 & 1 shared V-1s		KIA 27 December 1944.
Peter Francis Locker Hall	8	-	DFC*	Also 1 probable.
Owen Hardy	3 & 3 shared	-	DFC*	Also 1 probable.
James Chilton Francis "Spud" Hayter	5	-	DFC*	Also 1 probable and 1 unclaimed. Served in the Royal Air Force. Flew in Battle of Britain.
Gilbert McLean "Gillie" Hayton	5	-	DFC	Possibly 6 aerial victories. Died on or about 20 October 1942 of thirst and exposure after the sinking RMS Laconia.
Michael James Herrick	6 & 2 shared	-	DFC*	Served in the Royal Air Force. Flew in Battle of Britain, also in South Pacific with RNZAF. KIA 16 June 1944.
Raymond Brown Hesselyn	18 & 1 shared	-	DFC, DFM*	POW October 1943.
William Henry Hodgson	5 & 2 shared	-	DFC	Also 3 probables. Served in the Royal Air Force. Flew in Battle of Britain, KIFA 13 March 1941.
Garnet J. Michael "Gus" Hooper	1	8 V-1s	DFC	
John Arthur Houlton	5 & 2 shared	-	DFC	
Reginald Jack Hyde	5	-	AFC	Also 1 probable. Served in the Royal Air Force. Flew in Battle of Britain.
Mervyn Robert Bruce Ingram	8 & 6 shared	-	DFC	Also 3 probables. Died of sickness 11 July 1944.
George Edmond "Jamie" Jameson	11	-	DSO, DFC	New Zealand's highest scoring night fighter ace of WWII.
Patrick Geraint Jameson	9	-	DSO, DFC*	Also 1 probable and 1 shared probable. Served in the Royal Air Force. Flew in Battle of Britain.
Ernest Leslie "Nipper" Joyce	10	-	DFM	Also 2 probables. KIA 17 June 1944.
Ivon Julian	5	-	DFC	Also 2 probables.
Edgar James "Cobber" Kain	16	-	DFC	Served in the Royal Air Force and was its first flying ace of WWII. KIFA 7 June 1940.
William Arthur "Wacky" Kalka	0	9 V-1s		KIA 25 March 1945.
Robert Gordon "Dutch" Kleimeyer	0	7 & 1 shared V-1s	DFC	
Frank Brewster "Bruce" Lawless	1	10 V-1s	DFC, DFC (US)	
Keith Ashley Lawrence	4 & 2 shared	-	DFC	Served in the Royal New Zealand Air Force. Flew in Battle of Britain.
Roy Emile LeLong	7	3 V-1s	AFC, DFC*	Also 1 probable.
David Franklin Livingstone	5 & 2 shared	-	DFC	
Harold Watson Longley	5 & 1 shared	-	DFC	Total includes 3 aircraft destroyed on ground or sea.
Kevin McCarthy	0	6 V-1s		
James Hugh "Black Mac" McCaw	0	19 & 1 shared V-1s	DFC	
Sir Hector Douglas McGregor	2	-	DSO	Has been credited with 6 aerial victories in the past. Served in the Royal Air Force. Flew in Battle of Britain.
John Noble MacKenzie	9 & 1 shared	-	DFC	Served in the Royal Air Force. Flew in Battle of Britain.
Russell Merriman MacKenzie	3 & 1 shared	-	DSO, DFC	Total may be 4 & 1 shared.
Evan Dall "Rosie" Mackie	23	-	DSO, DFC*	Also 2 probables.
Henry Maurice "Morrie" Mason	0	5 & 1 shared V-1s	DFC, FC (NL)	KIFA 19 July 1948.
William Lister "Dusty" Miller	0	7 V-1s	DFC	
Leighton John Montgomerie	4 & 1 shared	-	DFC	DOW 29 August 1944.
Francis "Spud" Murphy	4	-	DFC	Also 1 probable.
Percival Guy Haig Newton	5	-	DFC	Also 1 probable.
Harold Leslie "Knockers" North	5	-	DFC	Served in the Royal Air Force. Flew in Battle of Britain, KIA 1 May 1942.
Brian John O'Connor	1 & 1 shared	8 & 1 shared V-1s	DFC	
Nigel Manfred Park	10 & 1 shared	-	DFM	KIA 25 October 1942.
Alan McGregor Peart	6 & 1 shared	-	DFC	
John Howard Player	4	-	DSO, DFC	Has been credited with 6 aerial victories in the past; KIFA 8 August 1947.
Neville Joseph "Pip" Powell	1	5 V-1s		
Paul Wattling Rabone	9	-	DFC	Served in the Royal Air Force. Flew in Battle of Britain, KIA 24 July 1944.
John Donald "Jack" Rae	12	-	DFC*	POW August 1943.
Arthur Norman "Artie" Sames	2 & 1 shared	5 V-1s	DFC*	Arthur Sames taught woodwork at Auckland Grammar School. He also built hydrofoil sailing yachts.
Warren Edward "Smokey" Schrader	11 & 2 shared	-	DFC*	Also 4 aircraft destroyed on the ground.
Desmond James Scott	5 & 3 shared	-	DSO, DFC*, CDeG*	Also 6 probables.
Cornelius James Sheddan	5	7 and 1 shared V-1s	DFC	
Irving Stanley Smith	8	-	CBE, DFC*	Served with the Royal New Zealand Air Force. Flew in Battle of Britain.
Robert Lawrence Spurdle	10	-	DFC*	Served with the Royal New Zealand Air Force. Flew in Battle of Britain, also in South Pacific with RNZAF.
John Harry "Jack" Stafford	2 & 3 shared	8 V-1s	DFC	
Gray Stenborg	14	-	DFC	KIA 24 September 1943.
Kenneth William Stewart	5	-	DFC	
William Hector Stratton	2 & 1 shared	-	DFC*	Has been credited with 9 aerial victories in the past.
Harvey Nelson Sweetman	2 & 2 shared	10 and 1 shared V-1s	DFC	
Kenneth William Tait	6	-	DFC	Served in the Royal Air Force. Flew in Battle of Britain, MIA 4 August 1941.
Keith Granville "Hyphen" Taylor-Cannon	4 & 1 shared	1 V-1	DFC*	Also 1 shared probable. MIA 13 April 1945.
Owen Vincent Tracey	6	-	DFC	Served in the Royal Air Force. Flew in Battle of Britain, KIA 8 December 1941.
Richard Macklow Trousdale	7	-	DFC*	Served in the Royal Air Force. Flew in Battle of Britain, KIFA 19 May 1947.
Arthur Ernest "Spike" Umbers	4 & 1 shared	28 V-1s	DFC*	Also 1 probable and 1 shared probable. KIA 14 February 1945.
Victor Bosanquet Strachan Verity	8 & 1 shared	-	DFC	Also 3 probables. Served in the Royal Air Force.
Derek Harland Ward	6 & 1 shared	-	DFC*	Also 1 probable. Flew in Battle of Britain, KIA 17 June 1942.
Edward Preston "Hawkeye" Wells	12	-	DFC*	Also 4 probables. Served with the Royal New Zealand Air Force. Flew in Battle of Britain.
Jeffery George West	4 & 2 shared	-	DFM	Also 1 shared probable.
Derrick Fitzgerald "Jerry" Westenra	8 & 3 shared	-	DFC*	Also 2 probables.
Gordon Albert Williams	5	-	DFM	
Bert Samuel Wipiti	3 & 3 shared	-	DFM	Flew in Southeast Asia and then Europe. KIA 3 October 1943.
Brian Wallace Woodman	4 & 1 shared	-	DFC	
Robert Duncan Yule	3 & 5 shared	-	DSO, DFC*	Also 2 probables and 1 shared probable. Served in the Royal Air Force. Flew in Battle of Britain, KIFA 11 September 1953.

== Table notes ==
=== Abbreviations ===
- "KIA" in Notes means Killed in action (dates are included where possible).
- "KIFA" in Notes means Killed in Flying Accident.
- "MIA" in Notes means Missing in action.
- "WIA" in Notes means Wounded in action.
- "POW" in Notes means Prisoner of War.

=== Awards ===
Award	Title	Notes
AFC	Air Force Cross	Awarded for "an act or acts of valour, courage or devotion to duty whilst flying, though not in active operations against the enemy".
CDeG	Croix de Guerre	A military decoration of both France and Belgium, also commonly bestowed to foreign military forces allied to France and Belgium.
DFC	Distinguished Flying Cross	Awarded to Royal Air Force commissioned officers and warrant officers for "an act or acts of valour, courage or devotion to duty whilst flying in active operations against the enemy".
DFC*	Distinguished Flying Cross and Bar	A bar is added to the ribbon for holders of the DFC who received a second award.
DFC (US)	Distinguished Flying Cross – United States	The Distinguished Flying Cross is a medal awarded to any officer or enlisted member of the United States armed forces who distinguishes himself or herself in support of operations by "heroism or extraordinary achievement while participating in an aerial flight".
DFM	Distinguished Flying Medal	Awarded to military below commissioned rank, for "an act or acts of valour, courage or devotion to duty whilst flying in active operations against the enemy".
DSO	Distinguished Service Order	Awarded for meritorious or distinguished service by officers of the armed forces during wartime.
DSO*	Distinguished Service Order and Bar	A bar is added to the ribbon for holders of the DSO who received a second award.

== See also ==
- List of World War II flying aces by country
