= Ian Waddy =

New Zealand WWII Squadron Leader

Ian Dousland Waddy
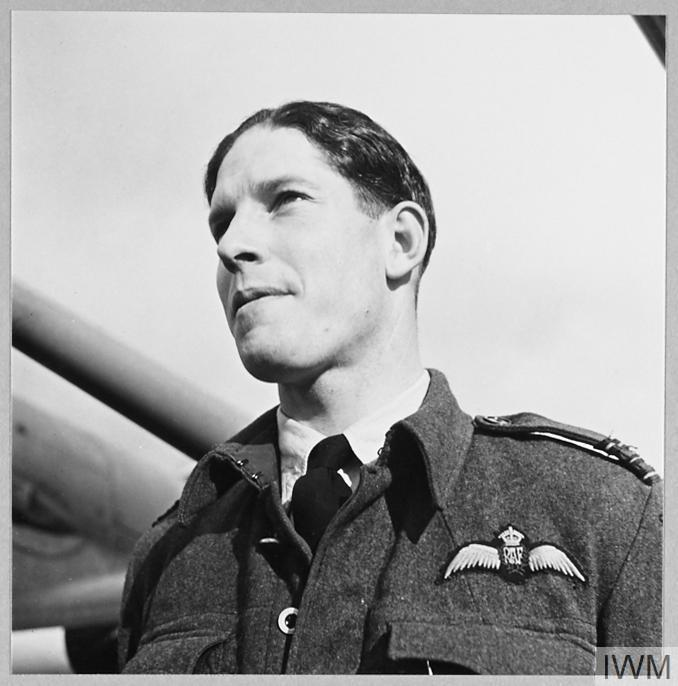
- Acting Squadron Leader Ian Dousland Waddy. No. 486 (RNZAF) Squadron. March 1944
- Born: 5 December 1914; Blenheim, Marlborough, New Zealand
- Died: 16 September 1998 (aged 83); Christchurch, Canterbury, New Zealand
- Burial place: Seddon Cemetery, Seddon, Marlborough, New Zealand
- Spouse: Helen Margaret Mary
- Children: 2
- Military career
- Allegiance: New Zealand; United Kingdom
- Branch: Royal New Zealand Air Force
- Rank: Squadron Leader
- Service number: NZ402915
- Unit: No. 486 Squadron RNZAF
- Commands: No. 486 Squadron RNZAF; No. 164 Squadron RAF
- Conflicts: Second World War
- Awards: Distinguished Flying Cross

Squadron Leader Ian Dousland Waddy, DFC (5 December 1914 – 16 September 1998) was a fighter pilot of the Royal New Zealand Air Force during the Second World War. He was an original member of No. 486 Squadron RNZAF, rising to become its commanding officer. He was shot down on 25 August 1944 while commanding No. 164 Squadron RAF, becoming a prisoner of war.

== Early life ==
Ian Dousland Waddy was born on 5 November 1914 in Blenheim, in the Marlborough district of New Zealand, the son of Charles and Ethel Waddy. He went to school in Christchurch. Prior to the start of the war, Waddy was a farmhand in Seddon in the Marlborough region.

== Second World War ==
=== Initial training ===
Waddy enlisted with the Royal New Zealand Air Force (RNZAF) on 31 August 1940, at age 25. His elementary flying training (EFTS) was conducted on a DH82 Tiger Moth on which he spent 10 hours. His flying badge was dated 10 February 1941; the RNZAF was using the pre-war RAF system of pilot training, with the badge "awarded" at the conclusion of the ITS (Intermediate Training Squadron) stage, although it was not actually presented until the end of the ATS (Advanced Training Squadron) stage.

Following his elementary training classes he was sent to No. 2 Service Flying Training School RNZAF at RNZAF Woodbourne (Class 6B). He completed this course on 21 March 1941 as a sergeant pilot.

=== Early European postings ===
Waddy departed New Zealand on 29 April 1941 aboard the ocean liner HMT Awatea for service with the Royal Air Force. The Awatea travelled to the United Kingdom via Canada, arriving at its final destination in June. On arrival in the United Kingdom, Waddy was sent to No. 61 Operational Training Unit RAF at RAF Heston where he undertook single-seat fighter training. He was then posted to No. 603 Squadron.

His new unit was based at Hornchurch which operated the Supermarine Spitfire Mk V fighter. The squadron was part of the Hornchurch fighter wing and regularly flew on escort missions and sweeps to German-occupied France.

=== No. 486 Squadron ===
Waddy departed No. 603 Squadron shortly before it moved to the Middle East and was posted to No. 486 Squadron RNZAF. He arrived at his new unit, which had just been formed at RAF Kirton in Lindsey, on 9 March 1942. No. 486 Squadron was the second New Zealand unit in Fighter Command and initially operated Hawker Hurricanes in a night-fighting capacity. Of the twenty-four RNZAF pilots in the squadron, Waddy was one of ten that already had wartime service experience. After a period of training, it became operational in April.

Commissioned as a pilot officer on 22 May, Waddy continued his service with No. 486 Squadron, which toward the end of September began to convert to the Hawker Typhoon fighter. Promoted to flying officer in December, Waddy and his fellow pilots continued to gain experience on the new Typhoon type, although he and his wingman, Jim McCaw (grandfather of Richie McCaw), closely avoided being shot down by two Focke-Wulf Fw 190s in early 1943.

On 9 April 1943, Waddy shared in two enemy aircraft claims (one probable, one damaged) when the squadron engaged two Fw 190s. Led by Squadron Leader Desmond Scott, No. 486 Squadron Typhoons flew a Fighter Roadstead (shipping attack) to Étretat, France, where Scott, Spike Umbers, Harvey Sweetman and Waddy all secured strikes on both German aircraft which withdrew from their attack, one last seen trailing smoke below cliff-level in the vicinity of Cap D'Antifer.

In June 1943, Waddy attended Fighter Leaders School and on 10 July he took command of 'B' Flight from Sweetman who was posted to RAF Charmy Down. Waddy's ascension through the ranks continued; on 25 September 1943 he took command of No. 486 Squadron when the commanding officer, Desmond Scott, assumed command of the Tangmere Typhoon Wing. Promoted to acting squadron leader, Waddy remained in command of the squadron until 7 January 1944, having become tour-expired. By this point, Waddy had participated in virtually every major offensive show since assuming command.

On 11 January 1944 he was posted to No. 55 Operational Training Unit RAF, closely followed by a posting to No. 4 Tactical Exercise Unit (TEU) on 26 January 1944. While at No. 4 TEU, Waddy was awarded the Distinguished Flying Cross (DFC). The citation for the DFC, published in the London Gazette on 17 March 1944, read:

This officer has participated in a large number of sorties including very many attacks on shipping. Squadron Leader Waddy had led the squadron with great skill, courage and determination and has played a good part in the numerous successes obtained. He has invariably pressed home his attacks with great determination, setting a fine example to all.

— London Gazette, No. 36429, 14 March 1944

On 28 March 1944 he was again posted, this time to No. 3 TEU based at RAF Poulton.

=== No. 164 Squadron and Prisoner of War ===
Waddy was posted to No. 164 Squadron RAF as its commanding officer on 17 August 1944. Like No. 486 Squadron, No. 164 Squadron also flew Typhoons. Only a week later, on 25 August, Waddy was shot down. As part of a Ramrod (bombing mission), he led eight aircraft to Rouen, France, where they then attacked tanks and military transport with rockets. Waddy's aircraft, Typhoon PD457, is thought to have been brought down by anti-aircraft fire. Waddy was taken prisoner of war and sent to Stalag Luft I in Barth, Germany.

== Later life ==
Released from captivity at the end of the war, Waddy was invested with his DFC by King George VI in a ceremony in London and subsequently returned to New Zealand. He settled back in the Marlborough region and resumed farming. He married Margaret Mary and they had two sons, David and Michael.

Waddy attended a Typhoon and Tempest Association reunion at RAF Tangmere in June 1984 with fellow No. 486 Squadron pilot Vaughan Fittall.

Ian Dousland Waddy died in Christchurch on 16 September 1998 at the age of 83. He is buried at Seddon Cemetery in Marlborough. He was survived by his wife and two sons.

== Bibliography ==
- Martyn, Errol (2008). For your tomorrow. Vol. 3. Biographies & Appendices: A Record of New Zealanders who have died while serving with the RNZAF and Allied Air Services since 1915. Christchurch, NZ: Volplane Press. ISBN 9780473128289.
- Rawlings, John (1976). Fighter Squadrons of the RAF and their Aircraft. London, UK: MacDonald & James. ISBN 0-354-01028-X.
- Sortehaug, P. (1998). The Wild Winds: The History of Number 486 RNZAF Fighter Squadron with the RAF. Dunedin, NZ: Otago University Print. ISBN 1-877139-09-2.
- Thompson, H. L. (1953). New Zealanders with the Royal Air Force. Official History of New Zealand in the Second World War 1939–45. Vol. I. Wellington, NZ: War History Branch.
