= Beake =

Beake is a surname. Notable people with the surname include:

- John Beake (1938—2026), American football executive
- Lesley Beake (born 1949), Scottish-born South African children's author
- Percy Beake (1917–2016), British RAF fighter pilot
- Robert Beake (died 1708), English politician
- Stuart Beake (born 1949), British Anglican priest
