= No. 486 Squadron RNZAF =

No. 486 (NZ) Squadron RAF
- Active: 7 March 1942 – 12 October 1945
- Country: United Kingdom
- Allegiance: New Zealand
- Branch: Royal Air Force
- Role: Fighter
- Garrison/HQ: RAF Kirton in Lindsey
- Mottos: Māori: Hiwa hau Maka ("Beware of the Wild Winds")
- Aircraft: Hawker Hurricane; Hawker Typhoon; Hawker Tempest

Insignia
- Squadron Badge: A kea volant
- Squadron Codes: SA (Mar 1942 – Sep 1945)

No. 486 (NZ) Squadron was a fighter squadron established for service during the Second World War. It was a New Zealand squadron formed under Article XV of the Empire Air Training Plan. Although many of its flying personnel were largely drawn from the Royal New Zealand Air Force, the squadron served in Europe under the operational and administrative command of the Royal Air Force.

Formed in March 1942 and equipped with Hawker Hurricane fighters, No. 486 Squadron became operational late the following month, initially flying patrols protecting convoys making their way through the North Sea. Although trained in a night fighting role it soon became a day fighter squadron, operating Hawker Typhoon fighters. From late 1942 to early 1943, it was tasked with intercepting incoming raids mounted by Luftwaffe fighter bombers. It was then switched to offensive operations, escorting bombers attacking targets in France and then flying in a fighter bomber role. In early 1944 the squadron re-equipped with the Hawker Tempest. In the run up to D-Day, it attacked numerous military targets in France and the Low Countries. For several weeks following D-Day, it was called upon to deal with incoming V-1 flying bombs launched at England by the Germans. It began operating from the continent in September, supporting the operations of the advancing Allied ground forces as they advanced in France, and then into Belgium, Holland and Germany itself. After the war it briefly served in Denmark and on occupation duties in Germany. It was disbanded in October 1945.

== Background ==
In the mid-1930s, the Royal Air Force (RAF) was in the process of expanding and required an increasing number of suitable flying personnel. A number of schemes were implemented for New Zealanders to obtain short-service commissions in the RAF with the intention of then transferring to the Royal New Zealand Air Force (RNZAF) in the future. This led to over 500 New Zealanders serving in the RAF by the time of the outbreak of the Second World War.

At around the same time there was discussion between the governments of Britain, Australia, Canada and New Zealand to facilitate the co-ordination of training of air crew in the event of hostilities. This led to the implementation of the Empire Air Training Scheme (ETAS) in December 1939. Under this agreement, New Zealand committed to initially supply 880 full trained pilots for the RAF, with another 520 pilots being trained to an elementary standard annually. As each of the Dominion governments desired its personnel to serve together, the ETAS had a clause, Article XV, that allowed for the establishment of squadrons with personnel from the respective countries. In theory, the Dominions would supply the ground crew as well as flying personnel. However, in New Zealand's case, there was a reluctance to maintain RNZAF squadrons in Britain so the decision was made to allow for the formation of squadrons within the RAF designated as being New Zealand. These squadrons, known as Article XV squadrons, were formed around a cadre of New Zealand flying personnel already serving in the RAF but supplemented by newly trained pilots from the RNZAF, with administrative and ground crew being predominantly British.

== Formation ==
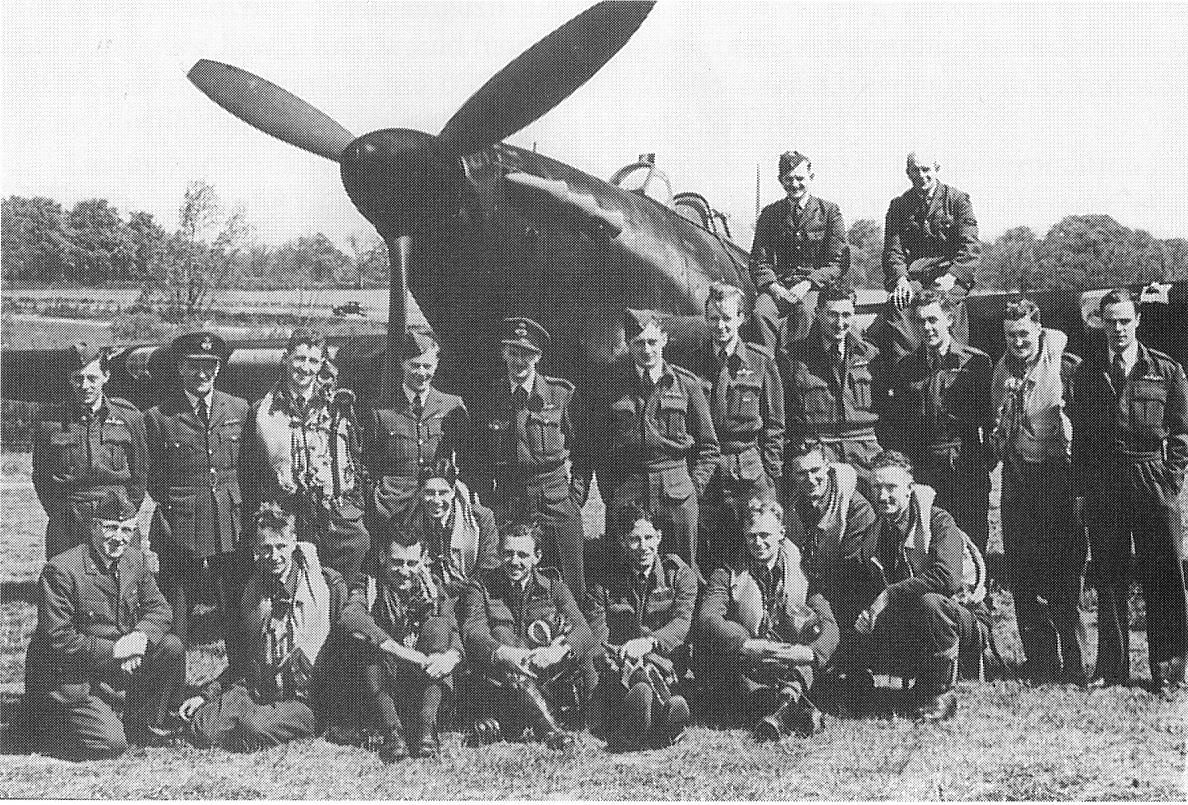
Hurricane night fighter pilots of the squadron at RAF Wittering in 1942

No. 486 Squadron was formed on 3 March 1942 at RAF Kirton in Lindsey, Lincolnshire, and was the second New Zealand squadron in Fighter Command. (Note: The first was No. 485 Squadron, formed in March 1941 at Driffield and which operated the Supermarine Spitfire.) The squadron's motto, in Māori, the indigenous language of New Zealand, was Hiwa hau Maka, or Beware of the Wild Winds in English. A kea volant was selected as its badge.

The squadron's first commanding officer, Squadron Leader C. L. Roberts, was British, while his two flight commanders, Flight Lieutenants John Clouston and Harvey Sweetman, along with all of the squadron's other flying personnel, were New Zealanders. By the end of March, the squadron was at its full complement of 25 pilots. Allocated the code letters SA, it was initially equipped with Hawker Hurricane IIs and trained in a night fighting role. It soon moved to Wittering where it was tasked with working in conjunction with No. 1453 Flight. This involved radar-equipped but unarmed Turbinlite aircraft, Douglas A-20 Havoc medium bombers with a searchlight in the nose, locating and illuminating enemy aircraft at which point an accompanying Hurricane could make the attack. These experimental trials with No. 1453 Flight were not particularly successful and were soon abandoned.

The squadron also carried out convoy patrols and its first operational flight, made on 27 April by Sweetman and Pilot Officer Arthur Umbers, was in this capacity. Sweetman was responsible for the squadron's first aerial victory, when he shot down a Dornier Do 17 medium bomber near Peterborough one night in early July. (Note: Sweetman's claim was subsequently reduced to a half share in the Do 17; another squadron operating in the area also claimed it.)

== Channel Front ==
=== 1942 ===
In late July, the squadron began re-equipping with Hawker Typhoons, in anticipation of switching to a role as a day fighter unit. It moved to the south of England in late August, settling first at North Weald and then West Malling, before a shift to Tangmere in October from where it would operate for over a year.

In September, No. 486 Squadron began flying standing patrols, meant to counter incoming Focke-Wulf Fw 190 and Messerschmitt Bf 109 fighter bombers that flew at high speed, and very low altitude, to avoid being detected by radar, to make sneak attacks on targets along the coastline of England. The squadron's patrol area extended from the Isle of Wight to Shoreham, near Brighton. On 17 October the squadron achieved its first success in its new role, when two of its pilots intercepted two Fw 190s and managed to shoot one of them down into the sea. It then went several weeks without a successful interception but once low level radar stations had been established along the coast in early December, earlier detection of incoming Luftwaffe raids was possible. The squadron's interception rates improved and on 17 December, two Bf 109s were shot down. At least five more German aircraft were destroyed by the end of the year.

=== 1943 ===
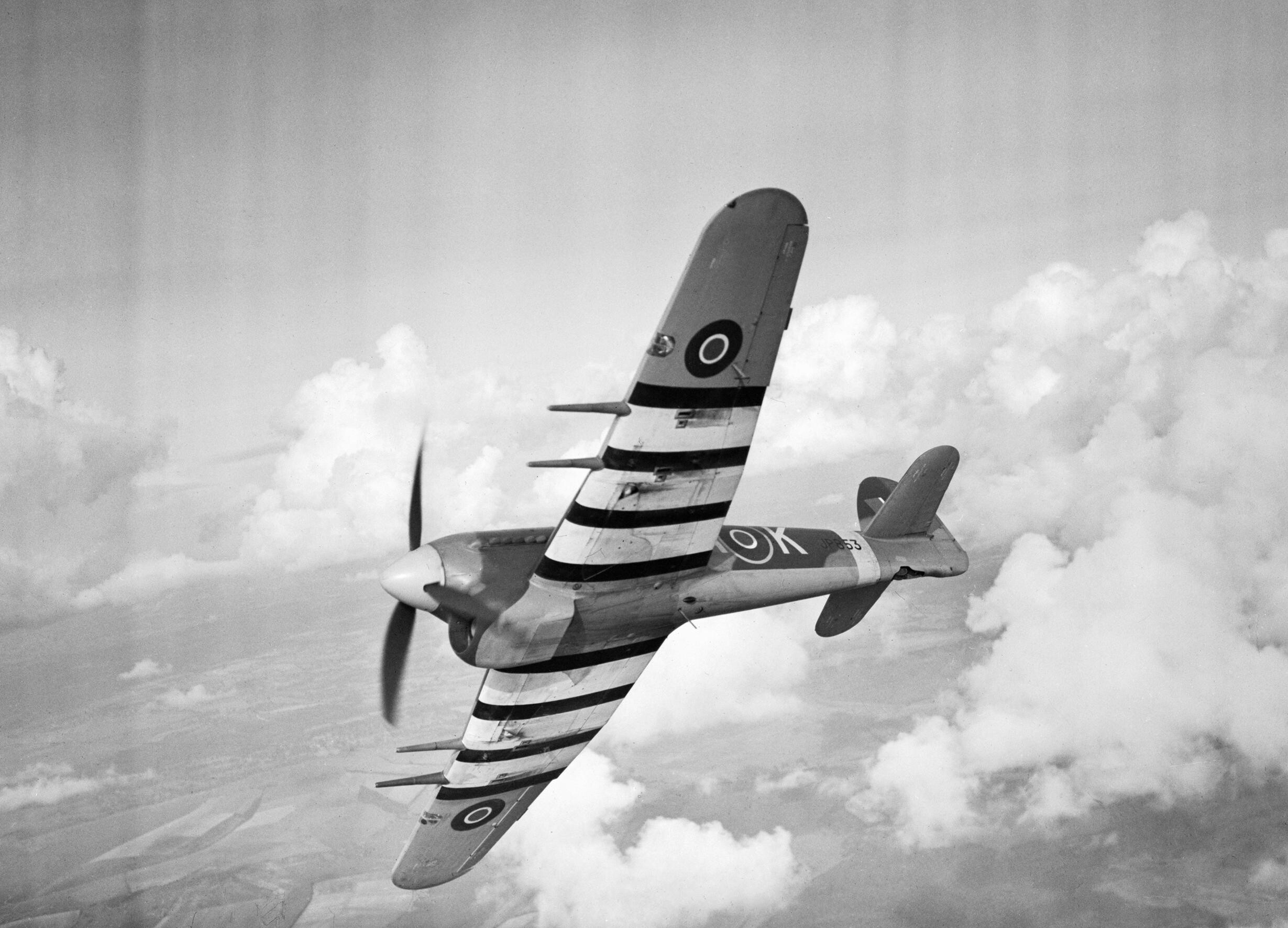
A Hawker Typhoon Mk IB of No. 486 Squadron RAF in flight, 1943

The patrols over the South coast against the Luftwaffe's raids continued into early 1943 and by April, the squadron had achieved 11½ aerial victories, mostly fighter-bombers but also the odd Dornier Do 217 bomber engaged in mine laying missions. The need for standing patrols began to decline as the effectiveness of the RAF's early detection of incoming raids increased, and instead sections of aircraft were kept on standby, ready to take off as soon as notice was received of approaching German aircraft. By the middle of the year, Luftwaffe resources did not permit the ongoing sneak attacks as its focus shifted to intercepting the increasing Allied bombing raids on Germany.

Consequently, No. 486 Squadron switched to an offensive role, the transition in tactics was overseen by Squadron Leader Desmond Scott, who had taken command of the squadron from Roberts in April. The squadron initially flew as escorts to bombers and fighter bombers carrying out daylight bombing missions on targets in France and the Low Countries. By the middle of the year, it was itself operating in a fighter bomber role, attacking targets in Caen, Abbeville, Triqueville, Boulogne, Cherbourg and Le Havre. It also attacked shipping along the French coastline. During this time, the first Distinguished Flying Cross to be received by personnel flying with No. 486 Squadron was awarded: the recipient was Flying Officer Frank Murphy, who was credited with 4 aerial victories.

In September, No. 486 Squadron became part of the Tangmere Typhoon Wing. The squadron was now led by Squadron Leader Ian Waddy, who had originally joined the squadron as a flight sergeant, as Scott had been promoted to wing commander and given command of the Typhoon Wing. As part of the Typhoon Wing, the operations of the squadron continued mostly unchanged; it either flew in a fighter bomber role, escorted by the other two squadrons of the wing, or did escort duty itself. In some instances, the entire wing flew as fighter escort to medium or heavy bombers attacking targets in France. It also flew the occasional aerial search and rescue mission and on one of these, the rescued crew presented the squadron with the centre board of their life boat. This was subsequently used as the squadron's scoreboard.

== Operations against V-1 flying bombs ==
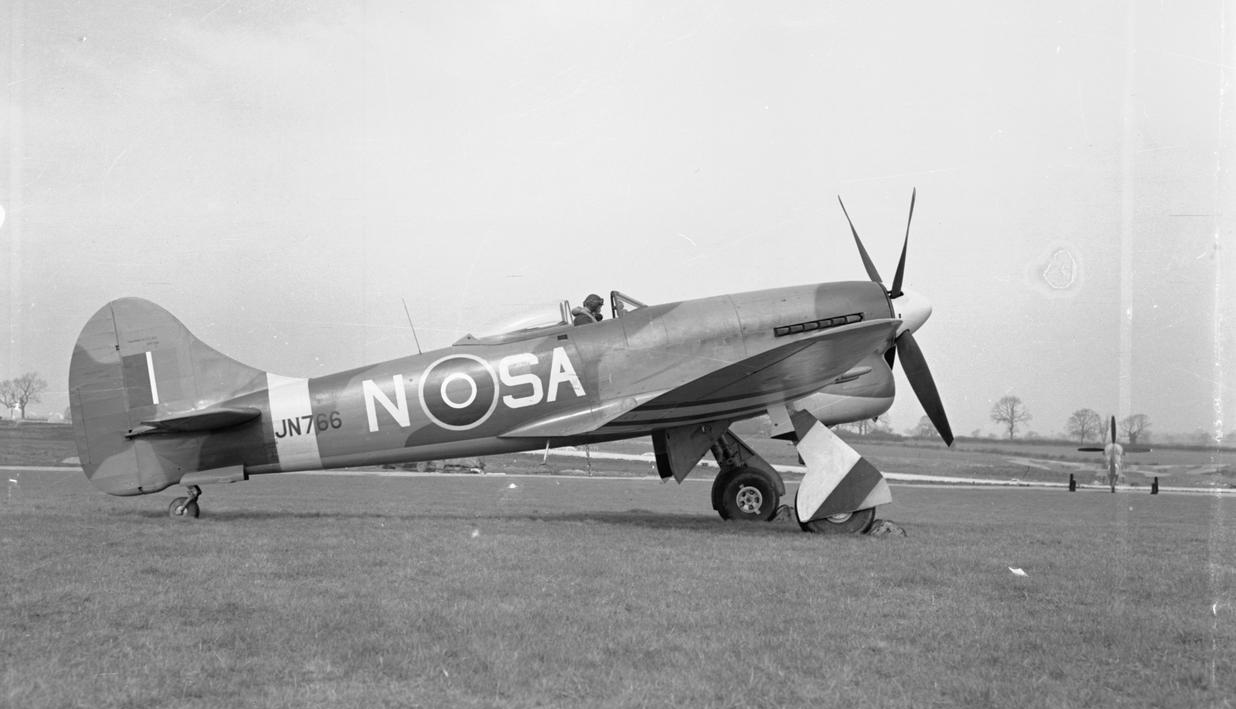
A Hawker Tempest V of No. 486 Squadron

Coinciding with the appointment of Squadron Leader John Iremonger as its commander, No. 486 Squadron began re-equipping with the new Hawker Tempest in January 1944. However, before it reached its full complement, the Tempests were subsequently transferred to No. 3 Squadron and the New Zealanders continued to operate their Typhoons. At this time, it was tasked with attacking the launching sites of the new V-1 flying bombs in northern France, as well seeking out German aircraft and their airfields.

In April it began receiving Tempests again and by 1 May was operational with its new aircraft. At this time, the squadron became part of No. 150 Wing, along with Nos. 3 and 56 Squadrons, under the command of Wing Commander Roland Beamont. Writing about the New Zealanders under his command, Beamont described them as:

"...an exuberant bunch of New Zealanders with a brilliant record on Typhoons and a rather casual approach (as I was soon to find out) to King's Regulations and Air Council instructions – and to "Pommy Bastard" wing leaders!"

Flying with No. 150 Wing as part of the Allied Expeditionary Air Force, the squadron carried out attacks on transportation infrastructure in northern France, as well as on shipping along the coastline. In the five weeks prior to the Allied invasion of Normandy, it flew 208 sorties. However, when the Germans started launching V-1 flying bombs at England, beginning on the night of 12–13 June, the squadron was tasked to deal with the threat as the Tempest was the fastest fighter plane available to the RAF. Along with No. 3 Squadron, also equipped with Tempests, it operated from Newchurch, a steel mesh field near Folkestone. Conditions were primitive, with personnel living in tents. By the end of August, No. 486 Squadron claimed 223½ V-1 flying bombs as destroyed, the second highest number of any unit. The most successful of the squadron's pilots were Owen Eagleson and Raymond Cammock, who both accounted for at least 20 V-1s each. However, three pilots were killed during the squadron's campaign against the V-1s.

== Service with the Second Tactical Air Force ==
In late September, with the V-1 threat over, No. 150 Wing was re-designated as No. 122 Tempest Wing, and was attached to the Second Tactical Air Force. It now began operating from airfields in France as the Allied ground forces moved through Belgium and Holland, the wing provided aerial support and cover. Umbers, who was a founding member of the squadron and served with it until he was posted away in September 1943, returned on 11 December to take command of his former unit. At the time, it was flying from the Volkel airfield in Holland. On 25 December, two of its pilots, Jack Stafford and Duff Bremner, shared in the destruction of a Messerschmitt Me 262 fighter jet. Normally the jet fighter would outpace the Tempests but Stafford and Bremner made a head-on engagement rather than attempt a chase. The Me 262 was damaged and, slowing down, was finished off by the duo and crashed near Aachen.

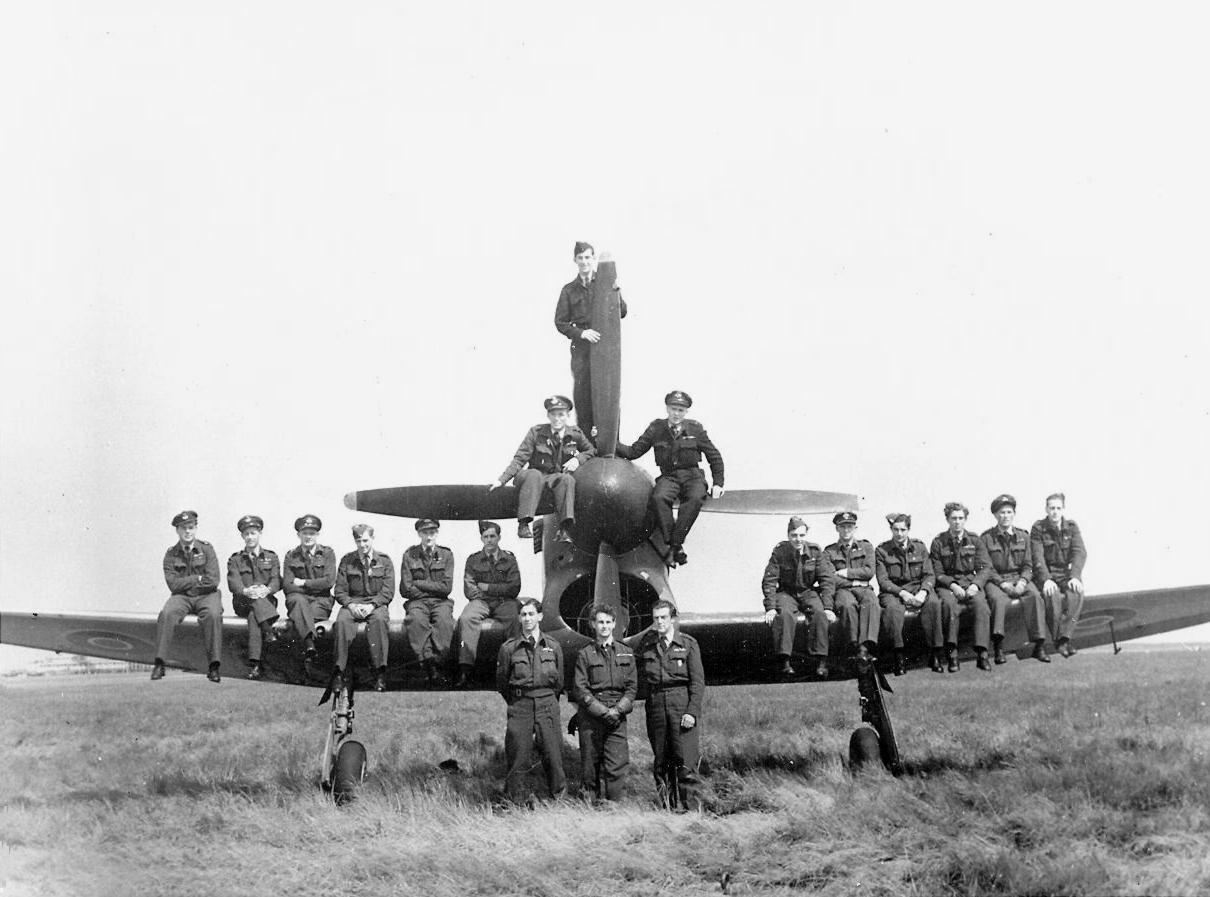
No. 486 Squadron in June 1945, Volkel, Holland

Poor weather affected operations for the first weeks of 1945 but No. 486 Squadron soon began flying well into Germany to attack transportation infrastructure and seek out targets of opportunity. Umbers was killed on 14 February while attacking barges on the Dortmund-Ems Canal, near Meppen. His Tempest was hit by flak, rolled out of control into the ground and exploded. He was replaced by one of the squadron's flight leaders, Keith Taylor-Cannon. The squadron switched tactics in March; casualties in No. 122 Wing's operations against ground targets had been high and it was decided that the Tempests would now carry out wide-ranging sweeps, hunting out the Luftwaffe.

No. 486 Squadron flew in support of the crossing of the Rhine on 23 March, dealing with anti-aircraft guns that were firing upon the Allied gliders involved in the operation. From 10 April, the squadron began moving to an airfield near Hopsten, within Germany itself. It became operational from there on 12 April and the following day its commander, Taylor-Cannon, went missing. It has been speculated that, seen to have bailed out of his stricken aircraft, he was murdered by the German troops that he had been strafing. Alternative reports had Taylor-Cannon dying of wounds in hospital. Postwar investigations were unable to locate his grave.

With Taylor-Cannon missing, Flight Lieutenant Warren Schrader took over command in an acting capacity before being promoted to squadron leader and confirmed in his appointment on 21 April. However, Schrader, who had been one of the most successful fighter pilots in the preceding few weeks having destroyed a number of German aircraft during this time, was soon given command of No. 616 Squadron, the first in the RAF to be equipped with the Gloster Meteor jet fighter. He was succeeded by the squadron's final commander, Jim Sheddan, on 1 May. The final sortie of the war for No. 486 Squadron was carried out a few days later, on 5 May, and involved several Tempests escorting a Douglas Dakota DC-3 to Copenhagen.

Soon after the war ended, No. 486 Squadron left No. 122 Wing and moved to Kastrup in Denmark. This was considered to be a "perk job" and the personnel of 486 were given an opportunity to unwind and relax, with each pilot being expected to log four hours of Tempest flying per month. On 1 July 1945 the squadron took part in an air display and airfield open day which was attended by the Danish royal family and some 300,000 Danes. One of the attractions was the strafing and sinking of old Luftwaffe Blohm und Voss Bv 138 flying boats anchored in Øresund strait.

No. 486 Squadron remained in Denmark until July when it went back to Germany, stationed at Lübeck as part of No. 124 Wing, an element of the British Occupation Force. It returned to the United Kingdom in September and its service ended on 12 October 1945 with the disbandment of the squadron at Dunsfold.

== Operational summary ==
No. 486 Squadron flew over 11,000 sorties and claimed 81 enemy aircraft as destroyed, another 5 probably destroyed and 22 damaged. Although squadron pilots claimed 241 V-1s as destroyed, RAF authorities reduced this to 223½; in spite of this the individual pilot's scores remained unaltered, as did the squadron scoreboard. When operating against ground or sea targets, it was responsible for the destruction of 323 motor vehicles, 14 railway engines and 16 ships.

While flying Typhoons, No. 486 Squadron claimed 22⅓ enemy aircraft as destroyed. Following the switch to Tempests, it claimed 59½ enemy aircraft shot down; it was the most successful of the squadrons flying the Tempest. No. 56 Squadron was second with 59¼.

Pilots serving with the squadron were awarded a Distinguished Service Order, 22 Distinguished Flying Crosses and six Mentioned in Dispatches.

== Commanding officers ==
The following served as commanding officers of No. 486 Squadron:

- Squadron Leader C. L. C. Roberts (March 1942–April 1943);
- Squadron Leader D. J. Scott (April–September 1943);
- Squadron Leader I. D. Waddy (September 1943–January 1944);
- Squadron Leader J. H. Iremonger (January–December 1944);
- Squadron Leader A. E. Umbers † (December 1944–February 1945);
- Squadron Leader K. G. Taylor-Cannon † (February–April 1945);
- Squadron Leader W. E. Schrader (April–May 1945);
- Squadron Leader C. J. Sheddan (May–October 1945).

== Legacy ==
A Hawker Tempest Mk.V, EJ693, was used by the squadron with the codes SA-I from September to October 1944. It was damaged in a forced landing on 1 October and was subsequently used by No. 151 Repair Unit as a test airframe for repaired engines. It is being restored by Kermit Weeks in Florida.
