= Keith Taylor-Cannon =

New Zealand flying ace

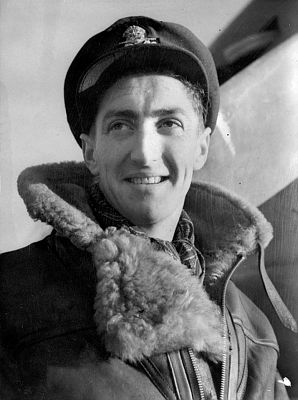
- Born: 20 December 1921; Omakau, New Zealand
- Died: 13 April 1945 (aged 23); Near Dömitz, Germany
- Military career
- Allegiance: New Zealand
- Branch: Royal New Zealand Air Force
- Service years: 1941–1945
- Rank: Squadron Leader
- Nickname: Hyphen
- Service number: 412284
- Commands: No. 486 Squadron
- Conflicts: Second World War; Channel Front; Operation Diver; Western Front (1944–1945); Western Allied invasion of Germany †
- Awards: Distinguished Flying Cross & Bar

Keith Granville Taylor-Cannon DFC & Bar (20 December 1921 – 13 April 1945) was a New Zealand flying ace of the Royal New Zealand Air Force (RNZAF) during the Second World War. He was credited with the destruction of five German aircraft as well as one V-1 flying bomb.

Born in Omakau, Taylor-Cannon joined the RNZAF in April 1941. After completing his flight training, he was posted to the United Kingdom to serve with the Royal Air Force. He was sent to No. 486 Squadron in 1942 and for the next two years flew extensively on a variety of operations. Rested in February 1944, after six months he returned to operational duties with No. 486 Squadron during the RAF's operations to intercept V-1 flying bombs launched at England. Once the threat of the V-1s receded, the squadron flew in support of the Allied advance into the Low Countries and then Germany. He became commander of No. 486 Squadron in February 1945 but was killed two months later after he was shot down while strafing German transport.

== Early life ==
Keith Granville Taylor-Cannon was born on 20 December 1921 in Omakau, New Zealand, to Lewis Lear Taylor-Cannon and Alice Louisa Taylor-Cannon. He was educated at Alexandra District High School, where he was an active sportsman, playing rugby and cricket. He went on to the University of Otago, where he studied at the School of Mines.

== Second World War ==
Still a tertiary student at the time, Taylor-Cannon joined the Royal New Zealand Air Force (RNZAF) in April 1941 as an airman pilot with the service number 412284. He received basic training at the Initial Training Wing at Levin, before going to No. 1 Elementary Flying Training School at Taieri in May. He soloed for the first time on 7 June. In July 1941, he embarked for Canada for further flight training. This commenced on 18 August at No. 6 Service Flying Training School near Dunnville. He earned his flying badge in November and was promoted to sergeant. Later that month he embarked for England to serve with the Royal Air Force (RAF). Once in England, Taylor-Cannon was assigned to No. 56 Operational Training Unit for familiarisation on the Hawker Hurricane fighter.

=== Service with No. 486 Squadron ===
In March 1942, Taylor-Cannon, nicknamed 'Hyphen', was posted to No. 486 Squadron. This had been formed earlier in the month as the second New Zealand squadron in Fighter Command. It initially operated Hawker Hurricanes from Kirton-in-Lindsey in a night-fighting capacity. However, its regular night-fighting operations were mostly uneventful. It soon moved to Wittering where it was tasked with working in conjunction with No. 1453 Flight. This involved radar-equipped but unarmed Turbinlite aircraft, Douglas A-20 Havoc medium bombers with a searchlight in the nose, locating and illuminating enemy aircraft at which point an accompanying Hurricane could make the attack. These experimental trials with No. 1453 Flight were not particularly successful and were soon abandoned. After a number of weeks the squadron was switched to day-fighters, converting to the Hawker Typhoon. In September, Taylor-Cannon was briefly attached to No. 1529 Beam Approach Training Flight.

From October 1942, and now operating from Tangmere, the squadron was regularly flying patrols along the south coast of England, intercepting incoming Luftwaffe Rhubarb missions. The squadron was responsible for the stretch between St Catherine's Point, on the Isle of Wight, and Shoreham. Initially there was little success but following the installation of low-level radar stations at intervals along the coast, earlier detection of incoming raids was possible and results began to improve. On 17 December, Taylor-Cannon and his wingman intercepted two Messerschmitt Bf 109 fighter-bombers and he shot down one, his first aerial victory, around 3 miles (4.8 km) south of St Catherine's Point. His wing man destroyed the other Bf 109. His second victory was on 17 January 1943, and was another Bf 109 shot down over the English Channel, 40 miles (64 km) from the Isle of Wight. In April he was commissioned as a pilot officer.

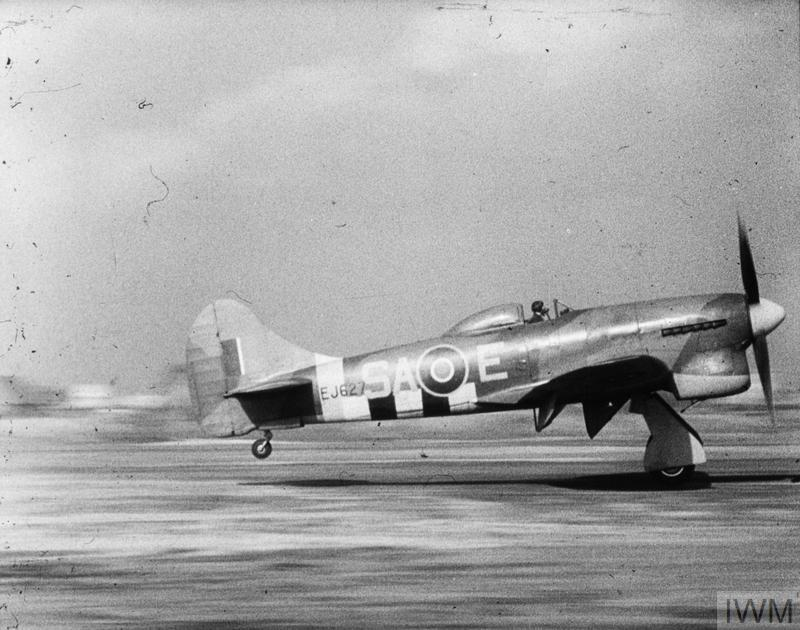
A Hawker Tempest of No. 486 Squadron talking off from Volkel Airfield

With the Luftwaffe easing its sneak raids on England, the RAF tactics changed in the summer of 1943. No. 486 Squadron was now flying offensive operations to occupied Europe, patrolling and attacking shipping. It also escorted fighter-bombers attacking airfields and ports. In addition, during this period the squadron also performed air-sea rescue missions, guiding rescue launches to airmen who had come down in the English Channel. Later in the year the squadron was performing in a fighter-bomber role itself, beginning with an attack on Maupertus Airfield on 25 October. The same month Taylor-Cannon was promoted to flying officer. By February 1944, Taylor-Cannon had flown 256 operations with No. 486 Squadron and, now in the rank of flight lieutenant, was rested with a posting to No. 3 Tactical Exercise Unit in Annan as an instructor. The following month, he was awarded the Distinguished Flying Cross (DFC) for "gallantry and devotion to duty in the execution of air operations".

Taylor-Cannon returned to operational flying with No. 486 Squadron, now equipped with the Hawker Tempest fighter, on 3 August 1944. He was given command of the squadron's 'B' Flight. Because the Tempest was the fastest fighter plane available to the RAF at the time, the squadron was tasked with intercepting German-launched V-1 flying bombs targeting England. Along with No. 3 Squadron, also equipped with Tempests, it formed No. 150 Wing, operating from Newchurch as part of Operation Diver, the British countermeasure program to the V-1s. On 15 August, Taylor-Cannon destroyed a V-1 over southern England.

The following month, No. 486 Squadron was sent to Grimbergen in Belgium to join the 2nd Tactical Air Force, where its operations were now in support of the Allied armies as they moved across the Low Countries. Operating as part of No. 122 Wing, the squadron was quickly moved to Volkel Air Base, in Holland. On 19 November, he and Flying Officer Owen Eagleson engaged a Messerschmitt Me 262 jet fighter taking off from Rheine Airfield and claimed it as probably destroyed. On 26 November, he shared in the destruction of a Junkers Ju 88 medium bomber over Münster. The following month, on 27 December, he shot down a Focke-Wulf Fw 190 fighter, also near Münster.

=== Squadron command ===
Poor weather affected operations for the first weeks of 1945 but No. 486 Squadron soon began flying well into Germany to attack transportation infrastructure and seek out targets of opportunity. On 15 February, following the death of Arthur Umbers, the commander of No. 486 Squadron, Taylor-Cannon was promoted to squadron leader and appointed to lead the unit. On 24 February he destroyed a Bf 109 to the northeast of Bramsche. In March, he was awarded a Bar to his DFC; the citation published in The London Gazette read:

Squadron Leader Taylor-Cannon has participated in a large number of sorties, and has led his flight and often the squadron with skill and determination, always pressing home his attacks whatever enemy opposition was encountered. The success achieved by the squadron has been mainly due to his brilliant leadership. A typical example of this occurred recently when his formation of seven aircraft was attacked by 30 enemy aircraft. Although outnumbered, Squadron Leader Taylor-Cannon with dauntless courage unhesitatingly led the squadron in to attack. In the ensuing fight he personally destroyed one enemy aircraft of the four brought down by his squadron.

— London Gazette, No. 37001, 27 March 1945

The squadron switched tactics at this time; casualties in No. 122 Wing's operations against ground targets had been high and it was decided that the Tempests would now carry out wide ranging sweeps, hunting out the Luftwaffe. No. 486 Squadron flew in support of the crossing of the Rhine on 23 March, dealing with anti-aircraft guns that were firing upon the Allied gliders involved in the operation. From 10 April, the squadron began moving to the Rheine Airfield near Hopsten, within Germany itself. It became operational from there on 12 April. The following day, Taylor-Cannon led a flight of the squadron's Tempests in an attack on a German transport column along the east bank of the Elbe, at Dömitz. His aircraft was hit by flak and he bailed out. According to Jim Sheddan, another pilot with the squadron, Taylor-Cannon's parachute was on fire and he landed heavily. Accounts of what happened next vary; a British prisoner of war reported that Taylor-Cannon was wounded, taken away and subsequently died. Another was that he was murdered by German troops from the transport column that he had attacked. Regardless, despite postwar investigations into how he died, Taylor-Cannon's body was never located.

At the time of his death, Taylor-Cannon was credited with having shot down five German aircraft, with one of these shared with another pilot. He is also credited with a share in one aircraft probably destroyed. He is responsible for having destroyed one V-1 flying bomb. With no known grave, he is commemorated on the Runneymeade Memorial at Englefield Green.
