= Norman Franks =

British writer and historian (1940–2023)

Norman Leslie Robert Franks
- Born: 1940
- Died: 21 May 2023 (aged 83)
- Occupations: journalist, author
- Writing career
- Genres: history, biography, non-fiction, militaria
- Subjects: aviation, World War I, World War II

Norman Leslie Robert Franks (1940 – 21 May 2023) was an English militaria writer who specialised in aviation topics. He focused on the pilots and squadrons of World Wars I and II.

== Biography ==
Franks published his first book in 1976. He was an Organisation and Methods Officer with the Nationwide Building Society in London before he retired. He lived in Bexhill-on-Sea, East Sussex, with his wife Heather. They had two sons, Rob and Mike, and five grandchildren.

He was a consultant for the Channel 4 television series Dogfight: The Mystery of the Red Baron. His 1995 book on the Red Baron was published and reissued by three publishers. He was also one of the founding members of the Cross and Cockade society for World War I aviation historians, which was formed in 1970, and a member of Over the Front, the league of World War I aviation historians.

In total, he authored over 120 books covering military aviation.

== Published works ==
- Franks, Norman. Double Mission: Fighter Pilot and SOE Agent, Manfred Czernin (1976, William Kimber, London) ISBN 0-7183-0254-0
- Franks, Norman. Fighter Leader: The Story of Wing Commander Ian Gleed, DSO, DFC (1978, William Kimber, London) ISBN 0-7183-0106-4
- Franks, Norman. The Greatest Air Battle: Dieppe, 19 August 1942 (1979, William Kimber, London) ISBN 0-7183-0396-2
- Franks, Norman. Wings of Freedom:Twelve Battle of Britain Pilots (1980, William Kimber, London) ISBN 0-7183-0197-8
- Franks, Norman. Sky Tiger: The Story of Sailor Malan (1980, William Kimber, London) ISBN 0-7183-0487-X
- Franks, Norman. The Battle of the Airfields: 1 January 1945 (1982 & 2002, Grub Street, London) ISBN 0-7183-0448-9 & ISBN 1-902304-42-X [Operation Bodenplatte]
- Franks, Norman. The Air Battle of Dunkirk (1983, William Kimber, London) ISBN 0-7183-0349-0
- Franks, Norman and Sheddan, C. J. Tempest Pilot (1983 & 2003, Grub Street, London) ISBN 1-904010-38-5
- Franks, Norman. Typhoon Attack (1984, William Kimber, London) ISBN 0-7183-0513-2
- Franks, Norman. Aircraft versus Aircraft: The illustrated story of fighter pilot combat since 1914 (1986). Grub Street (ISBN 0593010213). American ed. was issued by Macmillan (ISBN 0025406205) OCLC 13093976 192 pages.
- Franks, Norman; Forever strong: The story of 75 Squadron RNZAF, 1916-1990 (1991) Random Century ISBN 978-1-86941-102-2
- Franks, Norman; Bailey, Frank. Over the Front: A Complete Record of the Fighter Aces and Units of the United States and French Air Services, 1914-1918 (1992). Casemate Pub (ISBN 0948817542)
- Franks, Norman; Giblin, Hal; and McCrery, Nigel. Under the Guns of the Red Baron - The Complete Record of Von Richthofen's Victories and Victims Fully Illustrated (1995 & 2007, Grub Street, London) ISBN 1-904943-97-7 (1998 & 1999, Barnes & Noble, USA) (ISBN 0760712093) (2000, Caxton, London). 224 pages.
- Franks, Norman; Guest, Russell; Bailey, Frank. Bloody April… Black September (1995). Grub Street (ISBN 1898697086). 314 pages [The two deadliest months for Allied airmen in WW I, April 1917 & September 1918].
- Franks, Norman. Who Downed the Aces in WWI? (1996). Grub Street (ISBN 1898697515).
- Franks, Norman; Guest, Russell; and Alegi, Gregory. Above the War Fronts: The British Two-Seater Bomber Pilot and Observer Aces, the British Two-Seater Fighter Observer Aces, and the Belgian, Italian, Austro-Hungarian and Russian Fighter Aces 1914-1918 (1997). Grub Street (ISBN 1898697566). 218 pages.
- Franks, Norman. The Greatest Air Battle: Dieppe, 19th August 1942 (1997). Grub Street (ISBN 1898697744) OCLC 59641309
- Franks, Norman; Bennett, Alan. The Red Baron's Last Flight: a Mystery Investigated (1997). Grub Street. Reissued as a paperback in 2006 (ISBN 1904943330) OCLC 145733071
- Franks, Norman; Bailey, Frank. The Storks: The Story of the Les Cigognes, France's Elite Fighter Group of WWI (1998). Grub Street (ISBN 1898697817). 160 pages.
- Franks, Norman; Bailey, Frank; Duiven, Rick. Casualties of the German Air Service 1914-20: As Complete a List as Possible Arranged Alphabetically and Chronologically (1999). Grub Street (ISBN 1902304330). 362 pages.
- Franks, Norman; Holmes, Tony. Albatros Aces of World War I (Osprey Aircraft of the Aces No 32) (2000). Motorbooks International (ISBN 1855329603). 96 pages.
- Franks, Norman. Nieuport Aces of World War I (Osprey Aircraft of the Aces No 33) (2000). Motorbooks International (ISBN 1855329611). 96 pages.
- Franks, Norman; Wyngarden, Greg Van; Holmes, Tony. Fokker Dr I Aces of World War I (Osprey Aircraft of the Aces No 40) (2001). Osprey Aviation (ISBN 1841762237). 96 pages.
- Franks, Norman. Buck McNair : Canadian Spitfire ace : the story of Group Captain R.W. McNair DSO, DFC & 2 bars, Ld'H, CdG, RCAF (2001, 2005). Grub Street (ISBN 1904943039) OCLC 61755760
- Franks, Norman; Giblin, Hal. Under the Guns of the Kaiser's Aces: Bohme, Muller, Von Tutschek, Wolff : The Complete Record of Their Victories and Victims (2003). Grub Street (ISBN 1904010024). 192 pages.
- Franks, Norman. Sopwith Camel Aces of World War 1 (Aircraft of the Aces, 52) (2003). Osprey Publishing (UK) (ISBN 1841765341). 96 pages.
- Franks, Norman; Holmes, Tony. Sopwith Triplanes Aces of World War 1 (Aircraft of the Aces, 62) (2004). Osprey Publishing (UK) (ISBN 184176728X). 96 pages.
- Franks, Norman. Jasta Boelcke: The History of Jasta 2, 1916-1918 (2004). Grub Street (ISBN 1904010768). 224 pages.
- Franks, Norman. Ton-up Lancs: a Photographic Record of the Thirty-five RAF Lancasters that Each Completed One Hundred Sorties (2005).Grub Street (ISBN 1904943098) OCLC 57640345
- Franks, Norman. Sopwith Pup Aces of World War 1. (2005). Osprey Publishing (ISBN 1841768863) OCLC 71345188
- Franks, Norman. British and American Aces of World War I: the Pictorial Record. (2005) Schiffer Military History (ISBN 0764323415) OCLC 61658494
- Franks, Norman. Frank 'Chota' Carey : the story of Group Captain Frank Carey CBE DFC AFC DFM. (2006) Grub Street (ISBN 1904943381)
