= Warren Schrader =

New Zealand flying ace

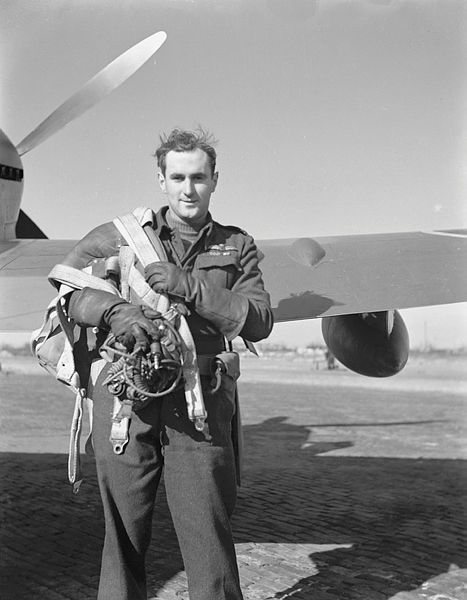
- Born: 27 March 1921; Wellington, New Zealand
- Died: 6 February 2009 (aged 87); Whangaparaoa, New Zealand
- Military career
- Allegiance: New Zealand
- Branch: Royal New Zealand Air Force (1941–1946)
- Rank: Wing commander
- Nickname: Smokey
- Commands: No. 616 Squadron; No. 486 (NZ) Squadron
- Conflicts: Second World War; Channel Front; Dieppe Raid; Operation Husky; Western Allied invasion of Germany
- Awards: Distinguished Flying Cross & Bar

Warren Schrader DFC & Bar (27 March 1921 – 6 February 2009) was a New Zealand flying ace of the Royal New Zealand Air Force (RNZAF) during the Second World War. He was credited with the destruction of eleven enemy aircraft.

Born in Wellington, New Zealand, Schrader joined the RNZAF in 1941. After completing flight training he was sent to the United Kingdom to serve with the Royal Air Force (RAF). He flew Supermarine Spitfires with No. 165 Squadron on operations on the Channel Front, including supporting the Dieppe Raid. He later flew with No. 1435 Squadron, initially based in Malta and then Sicily. After a period of instructing duties, he was posted to No. 486 (NZ) Squadron in early 1945, becoming its commander soon afterwards. In the dying stages of the war in Europe, he took command of No. 616 Squadron, the first RAF squadron to operate the jet-powered Gloster Meteor. Returning to civilian life in 1946, he went back to New Zealand and joined an airline, the National Airways Corporation, flying passenger aircraft. He retired in 1976 and died in 2009 at the age of 87.

== Early life ==
Warren Edward Schrader was born on 27 March 1921 at Wellington, in New Zealand. He was one of two sons of an Australian-born draper, L. Schrader, and his wife. Educated at Scots College, after completing his schooling he worked as an accounts clerk.

== Second World War ==
In March 1941, Schrader volunteered for the Royal New Zealand Air Force (RNZAF). His flight training was at Wigram airbase in Christchurch, and he received further training in Canada under the British Commonwealth Air Training Plan. From there, he proceeded to the United Kingdom to serve with the Royal Air Force (RAF). He was posted to No. 165 Squadron, which operated Supermarine Spitfires on offensive operations to occupied France. He was involved in the Dieppe Raid on 19 August 1942, patrolling the airspace above the landing beaches at Dieppe.

=== Mediterranean ===
In 1943, Schrader was transferred to the Mediterranean theatre of operations, based at Malta where he flew with No. 1435 Squadron. The squadron frequently flew missions to Sicily, and in July that year helped to provide aerial protection for Operation Husky, the Allied invasion of Sicily. From early November, they began operating from Italy itself, based at Brindisi. By this time, Schrader was one of the squadron's flight commanders. On 12 November, during an attack on an airfield at Valona, Albania, he destroyed a Savoia-Marchetti SM.79 Sparviero bomber on the ground.

By the end of the month, the squadron had upgraded to Mk. IX Spitfires and flying one of these on 17 December, Schrader shot down two Messerschmitt Bf 109 fighters off the coast of Albania. On 3 January 1944, he shared in the destruction of another Bf 109. On 7 April 1944, his award of a Distinguished Flying Cross (DFC) was published in The London Gazette. The citation stated:

This officer completed numerous sorties from Malta during and before the invasion of Sicily and since taking over command of his flight, has proved to be a keen and reliable flight commander. His attacks have always been pressed home with much courage and complete disregard for personal safety. In December, 1943, Pilot Officer Schrader led his flight in operations against the enemy in Albania. Despite intense opposition he destroyed two enemy aircraft.

— London Gazette, No. 36549, 7 April 1944.

In May 1944, Schrader was taken off flight operations and transferred to Egypt, where he performed instructing duties at No. 71 Operational Training Unit at the RAF station at Ismaila. However, with the war in the Middle East now over, many pilots, Schrader among them, soon returned to England to be posted to units in Europe.

=== Europe ===
Arriving in England at the start of 1945 Schrader went on a conversion course for the Hawker Tempest. He later described it as "...a brute force aeroplane — a great big aeroplane with a great big engine, whereas the Spitfire was quite a delicate thing really". In March, and now a flight lieutenant, he was then posted to Holland, to join No. 486 (NZ) Squadron, at the time operating Tempests and part of the 2nd Tactical Air Force. As the Allies advanced into Germany, Schrader shot down a series of enemy aircraft in over a three-week period, beginning with a Focke-Wulf Fw 190 on 10 April while patrolling near Nienburg. He destroyed two more Fw 190s on 15 April in one of the squadron's most successful engagements, with eight enemy aircraft shot down that day during a single patrol. He shot down another Fw 190 the following day. On 21 April, he shot down a Bf 109 while it was attempting to land at an airfield north of Berlin. His command of No. 486 Squadron was made permanent the same day; Schrader had been acting commander of the squadron since its previous commander, Squadron Leader Keith Taylor-Cannon, had been killed earlier in the month, the day after the squadron commenced operating from an airfield in Hopsten, Germany.

Now in the rank of squadron leader, Schrader destroyed two more Bf 109s on 29 April over the Lauenburg bridgehead with another damaged, and on the same sortie, he also shot down a Fw 190. The three aircraft that he destroyed that day were among at least ten claimed by No. 486 Squadron. He destroyed another Bf 109 on 1 May, seeing it go down in flames and crashing in a field, observed by the entire squadron.

Schrader's successes of the previous three weeks saw him appointed commander of No. 616 Squadron, based at Lüneburg at the time, on 2 May. His new command was the first squadron of the RAF to operate the Gloster Meteor jet-fighter. He later claimed his appointment was politically motivated; as one of the most successful Allied fighter pilots of the previous three weeks, it was hoped that he would be able to claim the first enemy aircraft shot down by a British fighter-jet. With minimal time to familiarise himself with the Meteor, he destroyed three aircraft on the ground in the Kiel area the next day. He flew a total of six sorties in the Meteor before the conflict in Germany ended and he was unable to add to his score.

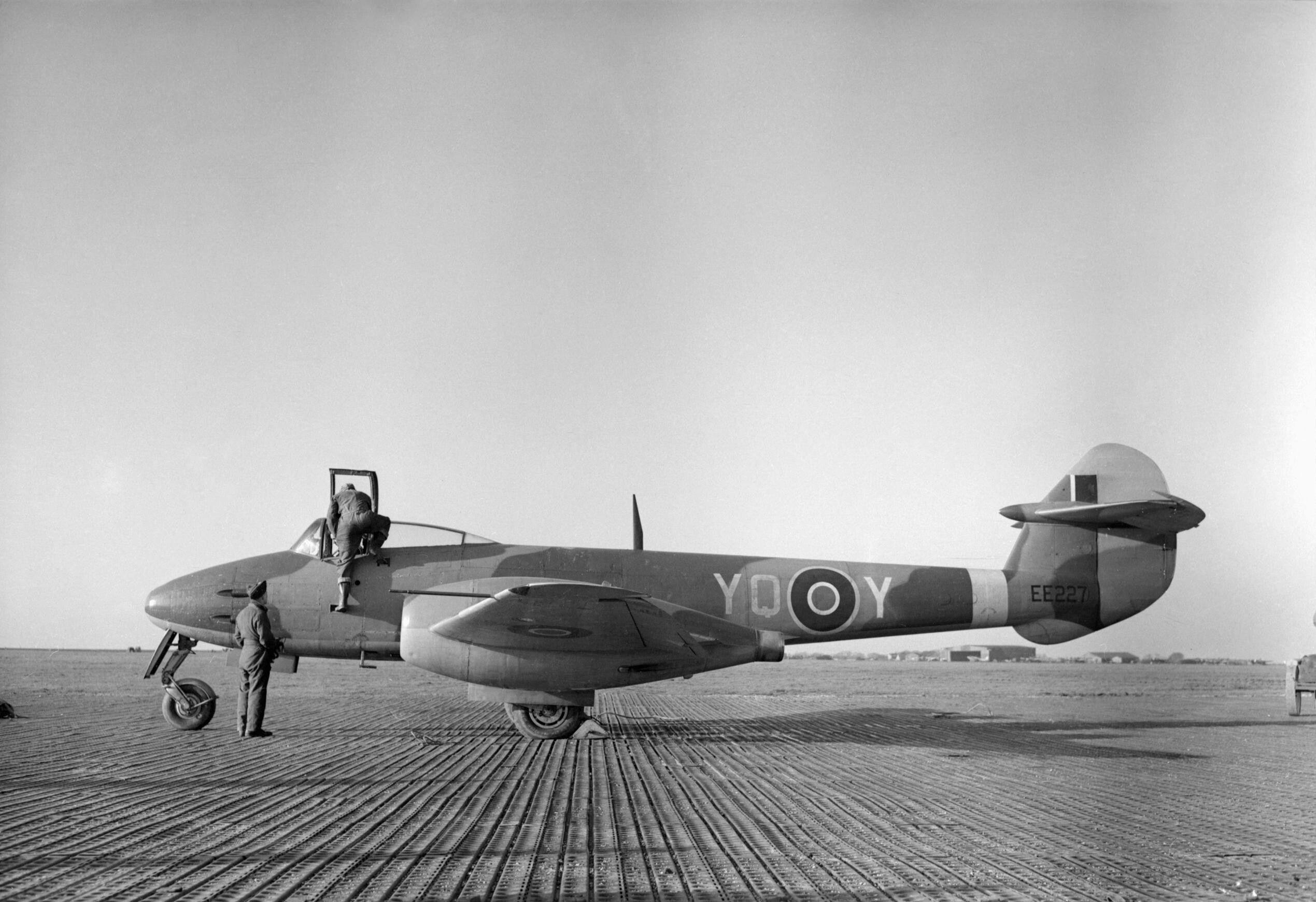
Gloster Meteor of No. 616 Squadron, 1945

The following month he was awarded a bar to his DFC. The published citation read:

As squadron commander, this officer has set a fine example of devotion to duty. He has proved himself to be a skilful, resolute and courageous fighter and has inflicted much damage on enemy targets on the ground. In air fighting, Squadron Leader Schrader had been responsible for the destruction of 9 enemy aircraft. His example has been most inspiring.

— London Gazette, No. 37154, 29 June 1945.

He remained in command of No. 616 Squadron, the only Allied jet-fighter squadron to fly operationally during the Second World War, until August 1945. He finished the war credited with the destruction of eleven enemy aircraft, and a share in two more destroyed. He also accounted for four aircraft destroyed on the ground. During his time as commander of No. 616 Squadron, he was one of the first Allied pilots to fly the Messerschmitt Me 262 jet-fighter although it crashed when he landed it at Lübeck, due to faulty undercarriage.

Promoted to wing commander, Schrader was given command of a wing of North American P-51 Mustangs, operating from Hornchurch in England and later had a period of instructing duties at the Central Flying School.

== Later life ==
Returning to New Zealand and civilian life in mid–1946, Schrader became a pilot for the National Airways Corporation (NAC), flying passenger aircraft. In August 1966, he was appointed the airline's chief pilot. He was one of the pilots that flew the Fokker F27 Friendship that the NAC provided for Queen Elizabeth II's use during her tour of New Zealand in March 1970. After nearly 30 years of flying airliners, he retired from the NAC in 1976. He died at Whangaparaoa, north of Auckland, on 6 February 2009. He was survived by his wife and two children.
