= Frank Murphy (RNZAF officer) =

British-born New Zealand flying ace of WWII

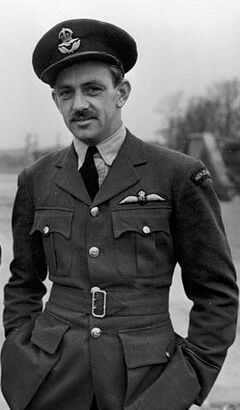
- Born: Francis Murphy; 19 January 1917; Bolton, England
- Died: 11 May 1997 (aged 80); England
- Military career
- Allegiance: New Zealand
- Branch: Royal New Zealand Air Force
- Service years: 1941–1945
- Rank: Squadron Leader
- Nickname: Spud
- Unit: No. 486 Squadron
- Conflicts: Second World War
- Awards: Officer of the Order of the British Empire; Distinguished Flying Cross
- Other work: Executive for Hawker Aircraft

Francis Murphy, OBE, DFC, FRAeS (19 January 1917 – 11 May 1997) was a British-born flying ace of the Royal New Zealand Air Force (RNZAF) during the Second World War. He was credited with the destruction of at least four aircraft.

Born in Bolton in England, Murphy was a child when his family emigrated to New Zealand, where they settled in Wellington. He was working as a clerk when he joined the RNZAF in March 1941. Sent to the United Kingdom for the final phase of his training, he was then posted to No. 486 Squadron in March 1942. Flying a Hawker Typhoon fighter, he claimed his first aerial victories at the end of the year. The final months of his war service were spent as a test pilot for Hawker Aircraft. After returning to civilian life following the end of the war in Europe, he continued to work for Hawker Aircraft, first as a test pilot and then in aircraft sales, until his retirement from the company in 1976. He died in England in 1997 at the age of 80.

== Early life ==
Francis Murphy, known as Frank, was born on 19 January 1917 in the city of Bolton in England. He caught polio as a toddler and, although successfully treated, this affected his leg and foot in later life. When he was five years old, his family emigrated to New Zealand. For his education, he went to Lyall Bay School and proceeded onto Rongotai College. Once his schooling was completed, he found employment as a clerk with the Land and Income Tax Department.

== Second World War ==
In March 1941, Murphy joined the Royal New Zealand Air Force (RNZAF). His initial training was completed in New Zealand before he proceeded to the United Kingdom. He went to No. 52 Operational Training Unit at Aston Down before being posted to No. 486 Squadron in March 1942 as a sergeant pilot.

=== Service with No. 486 Squadron ===
No. 486 Squadron had been formed earlier in the month as the second New Zealand squadron in Fighter Command. It initially operated Hawker Hurricane fighters from Kirton-in-Lindsey in a night-fighting capacity. After a period of training, it became operational on 27 April. The squadron was also involved with the experimental Turbinlite program, cooperating with No. 1451 Flight. This used a Douglas A-20 Havoc heavy fighter equipped with a searchlight in its nose. When operating interception missions at night, it would use its radar equipment to locate enemy aircraft, then illuminate them with the searchlight once spotted so that an accompanying Hurricane could endeavour to shoot it down. Murphy was a pilot in one of the Hurricane detachments involved in the program, which was ultimately unsuccessful.

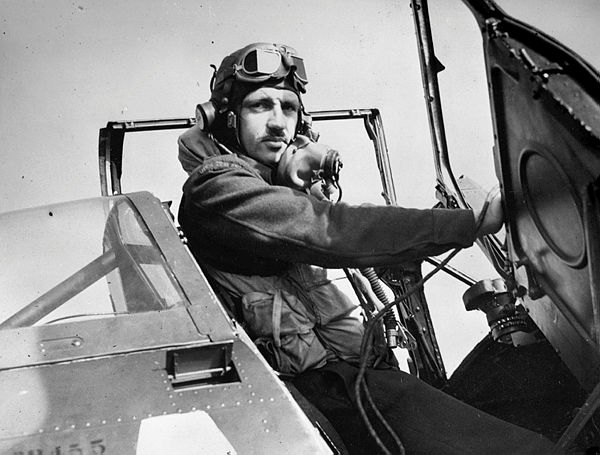
Murphy in the cockpit of his Hawker Typhoon fighter, November 1943

The squadron's regular night-fighting operations were mostly uneventful. After a number of weeks, it was switched to day-fighters, converting to the Hawker Typhoon fighter. From October, and now operating from West Malling and then Tangmere, it was regularly flying missions intercepting incoming Luftwaffe Rhubarb missions. The squadron was responsible for the stretch of coast between St Catherine's Point, on the Isle of Wight, and Shoreham. Initially, there was little success, but following the installation of low-level radar stations at intervals along the coast, earlier detection of incoming raids was possible, and results began to improve.

In the afternoon of 17 December, Murphy and his wingman intercepted two Messerschmitt Bf 109 fighter-bombers and he shot down one, his first aerial victory, around 3 miles (4.8 km) south of St Catherine's Point, seeing it crash into the sea. His wingman destroyed the other Bf 109. Murphy's second victory was on 24 December and was another Bf 109 shot down over the English Channel, 30 miles (48 km) from St Catherine's Point. On 16 February 1943, returning from a patrol, Murphy was alerted by the fighter controller at Tangmere to an unidentified aircraft. He sighted and subsequently shot down a Junkers Ju 88 medium bomber in flames into the English Channel off St Catherine's Point. Later in the month, he was commissioned as a pilot officer. He shot down a Bf 109 to the northwest of Fécamp on 29 April. Murphy was awarded the Distinguished Flying Cross in May, the first pilot of No. 486 Squadron to receive the honour. The citation, published in The London Gazette, read:

This officer is a skilful pilot. He has taken part in many determined attacks on shipping while, in air combat, has destroyed 4 enemy aircraft. His successes have been worthily earned.

— London Gazette, No. 36027, 25 May 1943

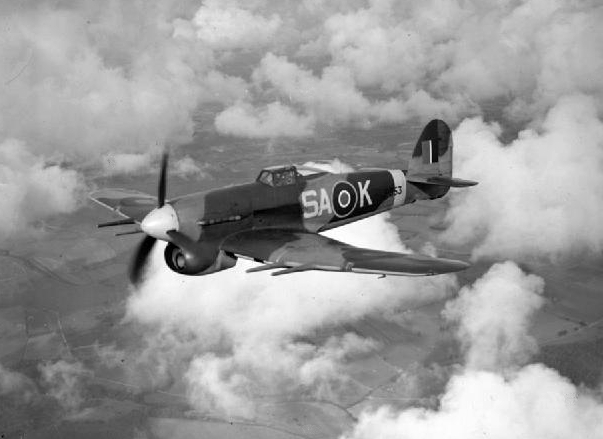
Murphy flying his Hawker Typhoon fighter

With the Luftwaffe easing its sneak raids on England, the RAF tactics changed in the summer of 1943. No. 486 Squadron was now flying offensive operations to occupied Europe, patrolling and attacking shipping. It also escorted fighter-bombers attacking airfields and ports. In addition, during this period, the squadron also performed air-sea rescue missions, guiding rescue launches to airmen who had come down in the English Channel. On 15 July, a section of the squadron was flying cover for a dinghy containing the crew of a RAF bomber awaiting rescue when it was attacked by several Focke-Wulf Fw 190 fighters. In the resulting engagement, Murphy claimed a damaged Fw 190 fighter some 40 miles (64 km) to the southeast of Selsey Bill. RAF officials, on reviewing his camera gun footage, upgraded Murphy's claim of a damaged aircraft to probably destroyed as it was judged that the Fw 190 would have been too badly damaged to make it safely to its home airfield. By the end of the year Murphy held the rank of flight lieutenant and was also commander of one of the squadron's flights.

=== Later war service ===
Murphy, at the time No. 486 Squadron's top-scoring pilot, was rested from operations in February 1944 and posted to the aircraft manufacturer Hawker Aircraft as a test pilot on Hurricanes and Typhoons. He subsequently tested the new Hawker Tempest fighter. His testing duties occupied him for the remainder of his war service. He married Gloria Higgs, a serving member of the Women's Royal Naval Service, at Windsor Parish Church on 28 April 1945, with the New Zealand High Commissioner Bill Jordan in attendance. Murphy ended the war credited with the destruction of four aircraft, plus one further aircraft considered probably destroyed.

== Postwar career ==
Murphy, in the rank of squadron leader at the time, secured an early release from the RNZAF in July to join Hawker Aircraft in a civilian capacity. In 1947, he went to India to work with that country's air force to introduce the Tempest II fighter into service there. He subsequently became the chief test pilot for Hawker, flying, among others, the Tempest VI, the Sea Fury, and the Hunter. He was a Fellow of the Royal Aeronautical Society. On a test flight in May 1953, while flying a Hunter, he became the first New Zealander to break the sound barrier. In September 1955, he became Hawker's liaison officer with the Royal Air Force. He later became the company's Foreign Sales Manager, working to equip many of the Gulf States with fighter aircraft and equipment.

In recognition of his services to the export industry, Murphy was appointed an Officer in the Order of the British Empire in the 1970 New Year Honours. He retired from what was then Hawker Siddeley in 1976 as it was in the process of merging with other aviation concerns to form British Aerospace; his final role as executive director of Military Sales. Settling in Surrey, Murphy died on 11 May 1997.
