= Harvey Sweetman =

New Zealand fighter pilot of the Second World War

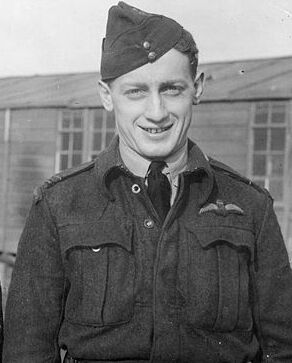
- Born: Harvey Nelson Sweetman; 10 October 1921; Auckland, New Zealand
- Died: 15 January 2015 (aged 93); Auckland, New Zealand
- Military career
- Allegiance: New Zealand
- Branch: Royal New Zealand Air Force
- Service years: 1940–1945
- Rank: Squadron Leader
- Units: No. 234 Squadron; No. 485 Squadron; No. 486 Squadron
- Commands: No. 3 Squadron (1944–45)
- Conflicts: Second World War; Channel Front; Western Front (1944–1945); Operation Diver
- Awards: Distinguished Flying Cross

Harvey Nelson Sweetman, DFC (10 October 1921 – 15 January 2015) was a New Zealand fighter pilot of the Second World War. He flew extensively with No. 486 (NZ) Squadron over Europe and was later commander of No. 3 Squadron. He was credited with shooting down three aircraft and at least eleven V-1 flying bombs.

== Early life ==
Harvey Sweetman was born on 10 October 1921 in Auckland, New Zealand, and educated at Matamata District High School in the Waikato, where he was swimming champion and captain of the 1st XI cricket team. He later worked as a clerk.

== Second World War ==
Sweetman enlisted in the Royal New Zealand Air Force (RNZAF) in April 1940 and, after flight training, left New Zealand for Europe as a sergeant pilot later in the year. After converting to the Supermarine Spitfire fighter at an Operational Training Unit, he served briefly with No. 234 Squadron before being posted to No. 485 (NZ) Squadron.

Sweetman achieved his first aerial victory on 29 August, when he shot down a Messerschmitt Bf 109 fighter north of Mardycke. Three weeks later, while escorting Bristol Blenheim bombers attacking a power station at Rouen, he engaged a Bf 109 that was encountered on the return flight to England. He was credited with this Bf 109 as probably destroyed. On 12 February 1942, No. 485 Squadron flew a mission escorting bombers attempting to disrupt the Channel Dash by the German battleships Scharnhorst and Gneisenau. During this mission, Sweetman, together with another pilot, shot down a Bf 109 that was attempting to engage their flight leader, Bill Crawford-Compton, west of Ostend.

=== Service with No. 486 Squadron ===
In March, Sweetman, promoted to flight lieutenant, joined the newly formed No. 486 (NZ) Squadron as one of its flight leaders. The flying personnel were mainly New Zealanders but with British administrative staff and ground crew. It operated Hawker Hurricanes from Kirton-in-Lindsey in a night-fighting capacity. After a period of training, the first operational flight was undertaken by Sweetman and Pilot Officer Arthur Umbers on 27 April. On the night of 23 July, Sweetman scored the squadron's first aerial victory of the war, a Dornier Do 217 medium bomber. This was recorded as shared with another pilot; although Sweetman was adamant that no other aircraft was involved, the surviving crew of the bomber were certain a Spitfire had shot them down.

Despite Sweetman's success, the squadron's night-fighting operations were mostly uneventful and after a number of weeks it was switched to day-fighters, converting to the Hawker Typhoon. From October, and now operating from West Malling and then Tangmere, it was regularly flying missions intercepting incoming Luftwaffe Rhubarb missions. On one such sortie, on 19 December, he damaged a Focke-Wulf Fw 190 fighter but it disappeared in cloud some 50 miles (80 km) off Bognor. He damaged another Fw 190 off Shoreham on 8 February 1943, when he and his wingman were directed by radar to a flight of four Fw 190s in the area.

Flying near Étretat on 9 April, Sweetman damaged a Fw 190 and shared in the probable destruction of another. At the end of the month he had to crash land his Typhoon near Selsey village on returning from a mission escorting fighter bombers to Le Havre. The engine of his aircraft had intermittently cut out on the return flight. The following month, he was awarded the Distinguished Flying Cross (DFC). It was the second DFC to be awarded to a pilot of the squadron; the first had been made just a week earlier. In July Sweetman, having flown operationally for nearly two years, left the squadron for an instructor's post at RAF Charmy Down before taking up production testing for the Hawker Aircraft Company. His role, based at Langley in Berkshire, involved test flying aircraft from the factory line.

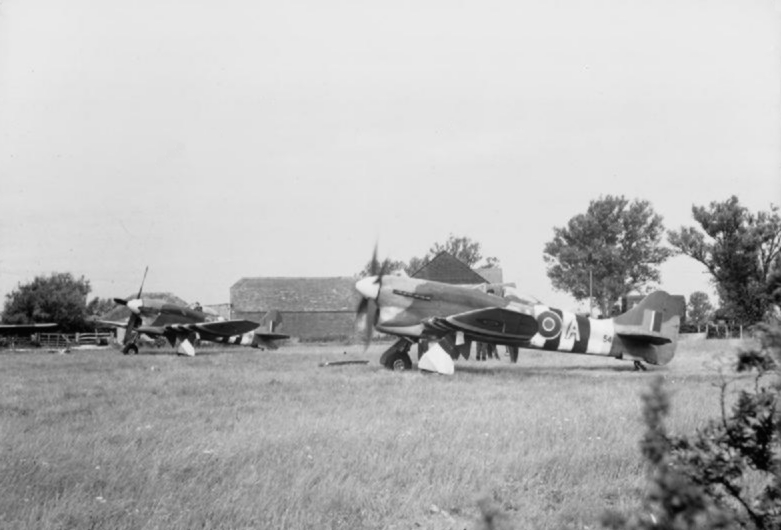
Hawker Tempests of No. 486 Squadron at Newchurch, 1944

Sweetman returned to No. 486 Squadron for a second tour to command 'A' Flight in February 1944. By this time the unit had converted to the Hawker Tempest Mk V and from the middle of 1944 Sweetman and No. 486 Squadron became heavily involved in Operation Diver, the campaign to protect London and southeast England from the V1 flying bomb offensive. Sweetman was one of the more successful of the squadron's pilots, responsible for destroying several V1s.

=== Later war service ===
Following the death of its leader, Sweetman was promoted to squadron leader and given command of No. 3 Squadron on 15 September 1944. He led the squadron in operations in support of the Allied advance into Western Europe until the following January at which time he was taken off flight operations for a rest. He returned to Hawker Aircraft Company as a test pilot, before going on to complete a course at the Empire Test Pilots' School at Boscombe Down.

Sweetman ended the war credited with the destruction of one German aircraft, one probably destroyed, and two damaged. He also shared in destroying two more, shared one probably destroyed and a shared damaged aircraft. He was a V1 ace, claiming eleven V1 flying bombs as destroyed with another shared.

== Later life ==
After the war Sweetman returned to New Zealand. In his later years he lived in retirement in Auckland. He died on 15 January 2015 at the age of 93, survived by his wife Alice and five children. He is buried at North Shore Memorial Park.
