= Desmond J. Scott =

British flying ace

Desmond James Scott
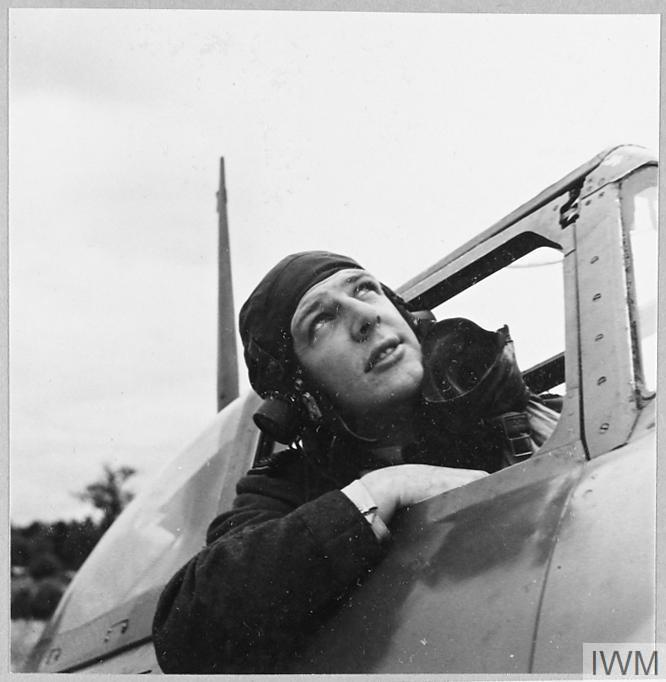
- Acting Squadron Leader Desmond Scott, in 1943
- Born: 11 September 1918; Ashburton, New Zealand
- Died: 8 October 1997 (aged 79); Christchurch, New Zealand
- Military career
- Allegiance: New Zealand; United Kingdom
- Branch: Royal New Zealand Air Force (1940–46); Royal Air Force (1947–49)
- Service years: 1940–1949
- Rank: Group Captain
- Commands: No. 123 Wing (1944–45); RAF Hawkinge (1943–44); Tangmere Fighter Wing; No. 486 Squadron RNZAF (1943)
- Conflicts: Second World War; Circus offensive; Invasion of Normandy; Operation Market Garden
- Awards: Distinguished Service Order; Officer of the Order of the British Empire; Distinguished Flying Cross & Bar; Mention in despatches Croix de Guerre (France); Croix de Guerre (Belgium); Commander of the Order of Orange-Nassau (Netherlands)

Group Captain Desmond James Scott, DSO, OBE, DFC & Bar (11 September 1918 – 8 October 1997) was a New Zealand fighter pilot and flying ace of the Second World War. He was credited with the destruction of at least five enemy aircraft.

Born in Ashburton, he learnt to fly privately. He joined the Royal New Zealand Air Force (RNZAF) in March 1940. Arriving in Britain in September, he was attached to the Royal Air Force (RAF) and flew Hawker Hurricanes with No. 3 Squadron. Awarded the Distinguished Flying Cross and Bar for his service with the squadron, he later flew Hawker Typhoons in operations over the English Channel and Europe. In 1943, he commanded No. 486 Squadron, for which he was awarded the Distinguished Service Order, and then the Tangmere Fighter Wing. At the end of the year, he was appointed the station commander of RAF Hawkinge. While in this role, he rescued a pilot of a crashed and burning Supermarine Spitfire, and was made an Officer of the Order of the British Empire for this feat. He commanded No. 123 Wing during Operation Overlord and subsequent campaigns in France and the Netherlands. He ended the war as a group captain, the youngest man in the RNZAF to achieve this rank. After the war, he transferred to the RAF and served with Transport Command. He returned to New Zealand with his family in 1948 and retired from the RAF in 1949. He died in 1997, aged 79.

== Early life ==
Desmond James Scott was born in Ashburton in the province of Canterbury, New Zealand, on 11 September 1918. His father, John Scott, was a shepherd but later moved his family to Cheviot, where he worked as a stock and station agent. Scott was educated at Cheviot School from 1929 and then from 1933, attended Cathedral Grammar School in Christchurch, as a boarder. Once his education was completed, he became a stock agent. He later worked as a salesman of agricultural equipment. He also served in the Territorial Force, joining the Canterbury Yeomanry in 1936 as a cavalryman. It was while he was on an exercise with the yeomanry, when his troop experienced a mock attack by Bristol fighters of the Royal New Zealand Air Force (RNZAF), that he resolved to learn to fly. He commenced flying lessons shortly afterwards.

== Second World War ==
In March 1940, with the Second World War well underway, Scott joined the RNZAF. According to Scott, he had taken advantage of a scheme that provided government funds to private individuals for flight training in return for a commitment to serve in the military if called upon. On the outbreak of hostilities with Nazi Germany, the scheme compelled him to enlist in the RNZAF. He was sent for training to the RNZAF base at Wigram Aerodrome and in late 1940, with others from his flight school intake, he sailed to England as a sergeant pilot to serve in the Royal Air Force (RAF). After his arrival, he received further flight training at RAF Sutton Bridge, where he learnt to fly the Hawker Hurricane fighter.

=== Service with No. 3 Squadron ===
Scott was posted to RAF Fighter Command, joining No. 3 Squadron, based at RAF Skeabrae in the Orkney Islands at the time. Not long after his arrival at the squadron, he helped recover the body of a pilot who had crashed on the airfield. He was reprimanded for this as he had left the cockpit of his Hurricane, idling on the airfield at the time, without permission.

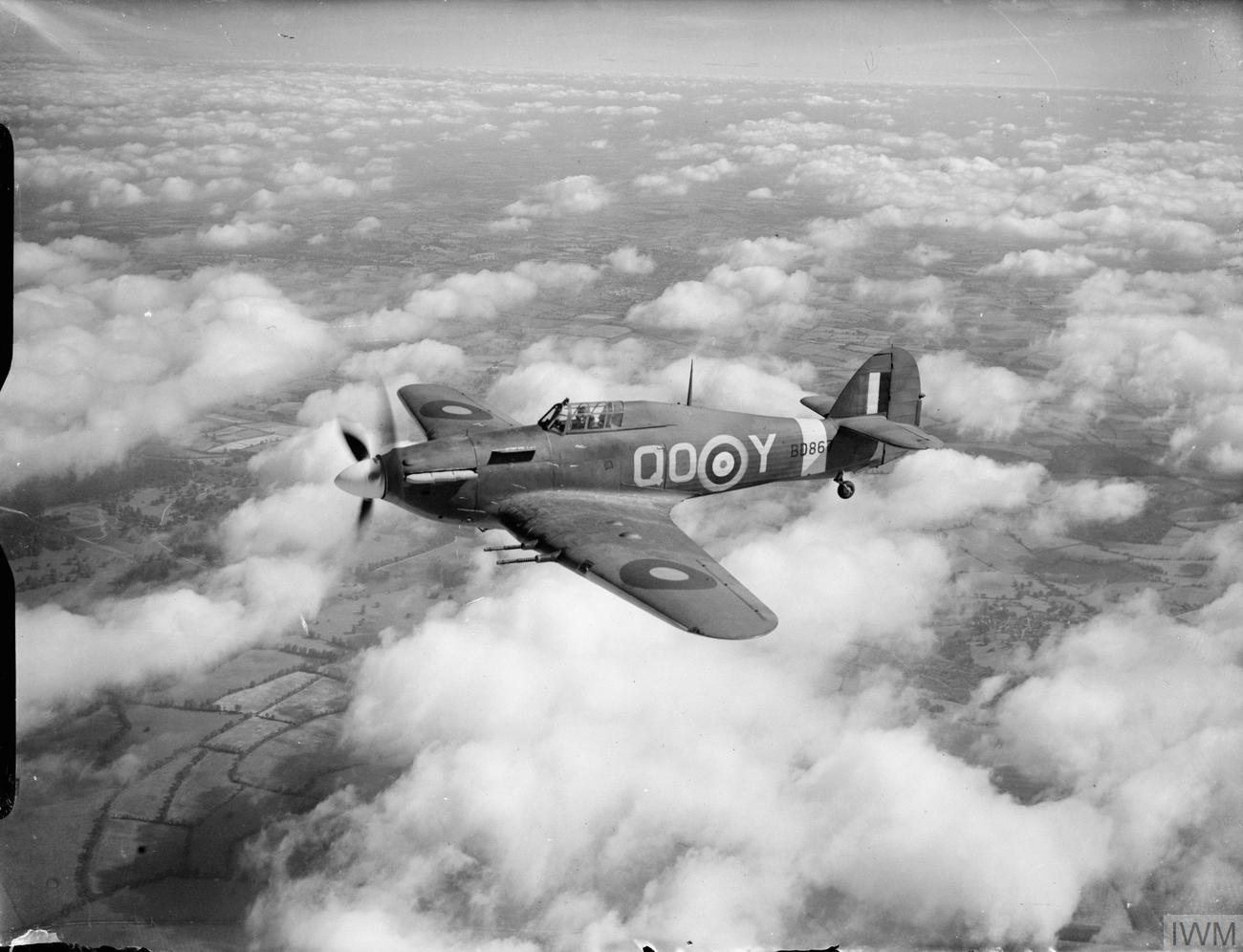
A Hurricane Mk IIC of No. 3 Squadron

In the spring of 1941, No. 3 Squadron, commanded by fellow New Zealander Russell Aitken was transferred to Martlesham Heath, near Ipswich, and became part of No. 11 Group. The squadron commenced a variety of duties: fighter sweeps, attacks on enemy shipping in the English Channel, escort missions, and night-fighter duties. On 7 August, while on a sweep over France, he claimed one Messerschmitt Bf 109 fighter as probably destroyed and another damaged over Le Touquet. Soon afterwards, he was promoted to flight sergeant. Later in the year and into 1942, Scott flew several night intruder missions over the Netherlands; a Messerschmitt Bf 110 heavy fighter was probably destroyed on the night of 5 January, with his first confirmed destroyed enemy aircraft, an unidentified type, achieved nearly three months later, on the night of 26 March. By this time, he was a pilot officer, having been commissioned earlier in the year. In May, and now flying a Hurricane Mk IIC, he destroyed two more aircraft, one being a half share with another pilot, and two probables, one of which was a Junkers Ju 88 medium bomber. Another Ju 88 was claimed as damaged. The same month, he was awarded the Distinguished Flying Cross (DFC). The citation, published in the London Gazette, read:

During a long period of operational flying, this officer has carried out a large number of sorties including attacks against shipping, aerodromes, night flying operations and close bomber escorts. Throughout, he has displayed great skill and keenness, while his exceptional devotion to duty has set an admirable example.

— London Gazette, No. 35542, 1 May 1942.

In June, he made only one claim, for a damaged Dornier Do 217 medium bomber. Promoted to flight lieutenant the same month, in July, a Ju 88 was confirmed as destroyed over Nordwijk and another unidentified type of German aircraft as damaged. Made a flight commander in August, he was taken off operations the following month.

=== Squadron leader ===
Having been promoted to squadron leader, Scott was posted to Bentley Priory, the headquarters of Fighter Command, in a staff role for six months. While at Bentley, he was part of a group working on night-fighting tactics. During this time, he was awarded a Bar to his DFC in acknowledgement of his service from June up until his departure from No. 3 Squadron. The citation, published at the end of September, read:

Since being awarded the Distinguished Flying Cross, this officer has completed numerous intruder sorties and has destroyed two and damaged several more enemy aircraft. In other sorties he has attacked enemy shipping. Flight Lieutenant Scott is an outstandingly successful flight commander who has displayed tireless efforts in the training of his pilots.

— London Gazette, No. 35721, 29 September 1942.

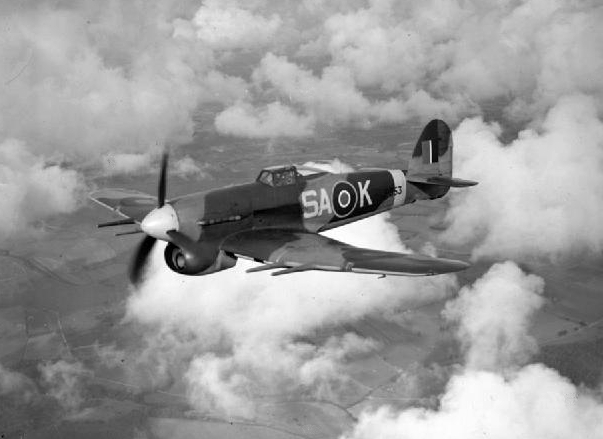
A Hawker Typhoon of No. 486 Squadron, 1943

He was presented with his DFC and Bar by King George VI in a ceremony held at Buckingham Palace in November. In April 1943, having ended his staff work at Bentley Priory, Scott attended a fighter leader's school and then converted to the Hawker Typhoon fighter. He returned to operations, joining No. 198 Squadron as a supernumerary for a brief period of time, before being appointed commander of No. 486 Squadron. At the time No. 486 Squadron was preoccupied with defensive duties, flying patrols to catch sneak raids mounted by the Luftwaffe. Implementing a high standard of discipline, he switched tactics, having the squadron attacking enemy shipping and carrying out offensive fighter-bomber operations over Europe.

Within days of taking over the squadron, Scott shared in the destruction of one Focke-Wulf Fw 190 fighter and the damage of another off Étretat. On 14 April, he shared in the destruction of a Bf 109. He was particularly remorseful on this occasion as he had fired on the pilot of the Bf 109, struggling to exit the aircraft before it plunged into the sea. He destroyed a Fw 190 on 25 May over to the south of Brighton, and a second late the next month off the Somme estuary. In July, he shared in the destruction of another Fw 190 near Le Havre. This was during a rescue operation, providing cover for a dinghy holding the crew of a British Vickers Wellington bomber that had crashed into the English Channel and which had been spotted by Scott's flight as they made their way to Le Havre to attack enemy shipping. The crew was later recovered. In early September, he received the Distinguished Service Order (DSO). The citation read:

This officer has participated in a large number of sorties. He is a first class leader whose great skill and fine fighting qualities have been reflected in the high standard of operational efficiency of the squadron which has obtained many successes. On several occasions his cool judgement and tactical ability have enabled his formation to exploit fleeting opportunities to advantage. This was amply demonstrated on one occasion in July, 1943, when the squadron was engaged in an air/sea rescue operation near Le Havre. Fighter opposition was encountered but Squadron Leader Scott skilfully drew away the enemy aircraft, two of which were destroyed by his formation in the ensuing engagement. This officer has displayed courage and tenacity of a high order.

— London Gazette, No. 36161, 7 September 1943.

=== Wing leader ===
The same month Scott's DSO was gazetted, he was promoted to the rank of wing commander and appointed leader of a fighter wing of three squadrons, one of which being No. 486 Squadron, at RAF Tangmere. In this role, he led the wing in fighter-bomber raids on targets in the northern part of France or escorted bombers. On 24 September, flying near Trouville, he claimed a Fw 190 as damaged. In November, he was rested from flying operations and posted as commander of the RAF station at Hawkinge. In January 1944, a Supermarine Spitfire fighter crashed in flames on the station's airfield. Scott went to the aid of the pilot and extracted him from the burning aircraft. For this action, during which he received burns to his face and hands, he was later appointed an Officer of the Order of the British Empire (OBE). The pilot he rescued later died of his injuries. The published citation for the OBE read:

In January, 1944, a Spitfire aircraft, which had been damaged by enemy action, crashed on an airfield and burst into flames. Wing Commander Scott, the Station Commander, immediately proceeded to the scene and ran straight to the cockpit, which was burning fiercely, to rescue the pilot who was severely injured with his clothing on fire. Despite the intense heat of the conflagration and exploding ammunition, Wing Commander Scott, after considerable difficulty, succeeded in extricating the pilot and carried him to a safe distance from the fire. Unfortunately the rescued airman died later. Wing Commander Scott displayed great gallantry and a complete disregard of his own safety. During the incident he sustained burns to his face and hands which would have been severe were it not for the foam which was sprayed over him from the fire tender.

— London Gazette, No. 36531, 26 May 1944.

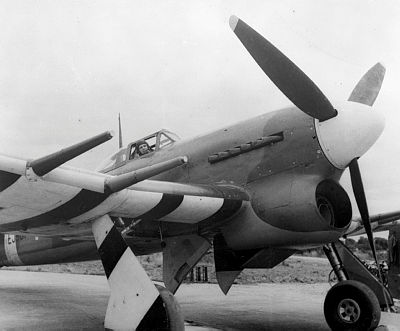
Scott in his Typhoon at Tangmere, 1944

In March, he was appointed commander of the newly formed No. 123 Wing, which operated Typhoons and was made up of No. 609, 164, 183 and 198 Squadrons. The wing flew in support of the invasion of Normandy and then Scott took his command, as part of the 2nd Tactical Air Force, to mainland Europe, firstly in France and then the Netherlands. When he was promoted to group captain in July, he was the youngest man to hold this rank in the RNZAF. Under his leadership, No. 123 Wing provided air support for the British during Operation Market Garden and for the Canadian infantry during the Battle of the Scheldt. For his services commanding the wing, he was mentioned in despatches.

Scott finished his tour in February 1945, by now a married man. He had wed Joyce Marguerite née Ramage in December the previous year. His wife was present when he was invested with the DSO and OBE a few months later in a ceremony at Buckingham Palace.

Already one of New Zealand's most decorated fighter pilots of the Second World War, Scott was awarded the French Croix de Guerre as well as the Belgian equivalent. He also was appointed a commander of the Order of Orange-Nassau, a Dutch honour. He was credited with five aircraft destroyed, and a share in three more. He also had six probables, two of which were shared with other pilots, and five damaged with one more shared.

== Postwar period ==
Scott was one of many pilots of the RNZAF who in the postwar period opted for a permanent commission in the RAF. He received a commission as a flight lieutenant from 14 August 1947 with his seniority dating from 1 September 1945. He retained his war substantive rank of wing commander but this was reverted to squadron leader later in the year. He was posted to Transport Command, where he was commander of the station at RAF Dishforth. He was later part of an RAF delegation sent to Greece, where he acted as an air advisory officer to the Greek Air Force. He retired from the RAF effective 28 February 1949, due to "medical unfitness", but by that time was already back in New Zealand.

== Later life ==
Returning to New Zealand with his family in December 1948, Scott settled in Christchurch and became an importer-exporter. He was a member of the New Zealand Labour Party and was initially selected to contest the Christchurch electorate of St Albans for Labour at the 1957 general election. However he ultimately did not stand in the election, and his replacement as the Labour candidate for St Albans, Neville Pickering, won the seat.

In 1972, Scott became married again, to Margaret Helen née Barrell; his first wife had died three years previously. He published an account of his wartime exploits, Typhoon Pilot, in 1982; it was well received by the public. He later followed this with One More Hour in 1989. He died in Christchurch on 8 October 1997, aged 79. He was survived by his second wife and the four daughters of his first marriage.
