= Jim Sheddan =

New Zealand World War II flying ace

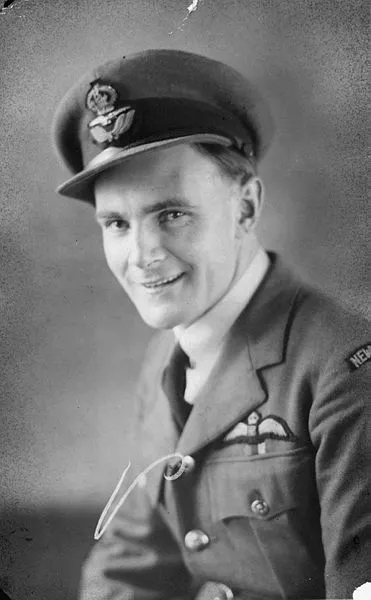
- Sheddan in 1944
- Born: 3 March 1918; Waimate, Canterbury, New Zealand
- Died: 9 December 2010 (aged 92); Helensville, New Zealand
- Military career
- Allegiance: New Zealand
- Branch: Royal New Zealand Air Force (1941–1946)
- Rank: Squadron leader
- Nickname: Jim
- Commands: No. 486 Squadron
- Conflicts: Second World War; Channel Front; Western Front (1944–1945); Operation Diver; Western Allied invasion of Germany
- Awards: Distinguished Flying Cross

Cornelius James Sheddan, DFC (3 March 1918 – 9 December 2010) was a flying ace of the Royal New Zealand Air Force (RNZAF) during the Second World War. He was credited with the destruction of five and a half German aircraft as well as seven V-1 flying bombs.

Born in Waimate, Sheddan joined the RNZAF in April 1941. After completing his flight training, he was posted to the United Kingdom to serve with the Royal Air Force (RAF). He had short postings at No. 485 Squadron and No. 1 Delivery Flight before being sent to No. 486 Squadron in September 1942. Following the Normandy landings, he flew extensively during the RAF's operations to intercept V-1 flying bombs launched at England. Once the threat of the V-1s receded, the squadron flew in support of the Allied advance into the Low Countries and then Germany. He was commander of No. 486 Squadron during the final stages of the war until its disbandment in the immediate postwar period. Returning to civilian life in April 1946, he was involved in farming work and pest control. He retired in the 1980s and wrote his autobiography, which was published in 1993.

== Early life ==
Cornelius James Sheddan, known as Jim, was born on 3 March 1918 in Waimate, in Canterbury, New Zealand. His family were farmers in the area. At the time he joined the Royal New Zealand Air Force (RNZAF), in April 1941, he gave his occupation as a tractor driver.

== Second World War ==
After completion of his flight training, Sheddan was posted to the United Kingdom to serve with the Royal Air Force (RAF). Arriving in December 1941, he went to No. 57 Operational Training Unit at the RAF station at Hawarden for training on fighters. He was then posted to No. 485 Squadron at Redhill, which was mostly staffed with New Zealand flying personnel. Sheddan was prone to ill-discipline and excessive drinking and he was only present for a short period of time at the squadron before he ran afoul of its commander. He was transferred to No. 1 Delivery Flight, where he transported a variety of aircraft to squadrons of No. 11 Group. During this time he developed an affinity for the Hawker Typhoon fighter and requested a transfer to a squadron operating this type.

=== Service with No. 486 Squadron ===
In September 1942, Sheddan was duly posted to the Typhoon-equipped No. 486 Squadron, the flying personnel of which were mostly New Zealanders. At the time it was engaged in attacks on German shipping, raids on Luftwaffe airfields in France, night-fighting duties, and spotting for air-sea rescue missions.

On 3 October the following year, Sheddan's Typhoon was damaged by anti-aircraft fire while he was flying a mission to France. Forced to ditch his Typhoon in the North Sea off the coast of France, he received a number of facial injuries as a result. After spending 19 hours in an inflatable dinghy, he was picked up by a Supermarine Walrus seaplane which had spotted him drifting off the French coast. Due to heavy seas, the Walrus lost its port wing float as it attempted to take off. Sheddan and one of the Walrus's crew had to go onto the starboard wing to act as a counterweight to compensate for the missing float as the aircraft began to taxi along the sea's surface towards England. Eventually, it was met by an air-sea rescue launch and towed the rest of the way to safety.

In spring 1944, No. 486 Squadron began converting to the Hawker Tempest fighter and started flying operations to France in preparation for the forthcoming landings at Normandy. As the Tempest was the fastest RAF fighter then in service, when the Germans began launching V-1 flying bombs at the United Kingdom in June 1944, No. 486 Squadron was tasked with intercepting them as part of the RAF's countermeasures to this threat. Sheddan was responsible for shooting down a number of V-1 flying bombs in the period from June to August. On one occasion, he was slightly injured when he had to force land at Netherfield, after his aircraft was damaged when shooting down a flying bomb. During his one-month recuperation in hospital, he met his future wife. Soon afterwards he had surgery to remove a cyst from one of his eyelids that was affecting his vision. This was done by a London doctor instead of through RAF doctors so he could avoid the risk of being taken off flight operations.

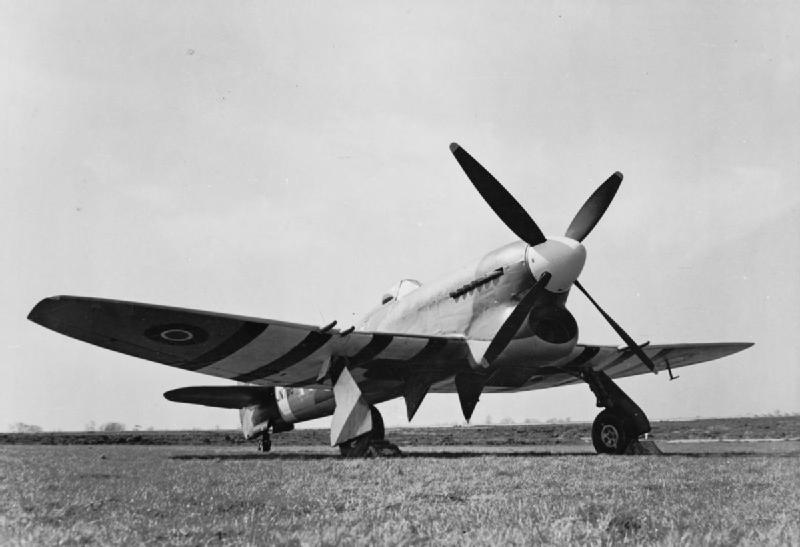
A Hawker Tempest of No. 486 Squadron, April 1944

Sheddan was commissioned as a flying officer in September 1944 and at the end of the month, the squadron shifted to the Volkel airfield in the Netherlands, where it began flying operations as part of the Second Tactical Air Force. On 1 January 1945, the Luftwaffe launched Operation Bodenplatte, a coordinated strike against the Allied airfields in the Low Countries. Most of the squadron was in the air at the time of the attack and returned to find Volkel under attack. Sheddan spotted a group of German fighters to the northeast of the airfield which he pursued. He ended up shooting down a Focke-Wulf Fw 190 fighter north of Venlo. He shared in the destruction of a Dornier Do 217 medium bomber with two other pilots, as it was attempting to land at the Luftwaffe base at Paderborn on 2 February.

The squadron flew in support of the crossing of the Rhine on 23 March, dealing with anti-aircraft guns that were firing upon the Allied gliders involved in the operation. The following day, Sheddan destroyed a Fieseler Fi 156 Storch. However, his wingman was killed during the encounter and Sheddan was so upset he never put in a formal claim for the Fi 156. He shot down two Junkers Ju 87 dive bombers near Stolzenau on 6 April. He destroyed a Fw 190, which he encountered when his section was strafing trains near Ludwigslust, on 14 April. On another sortie later in the day, he led two flights in strafing an airfield near Parchim; he shared in the destruction of three Junkers Ju 88 bombers that he and his wingman caught on the ground. Two days later he shared in an aerial victory over a Fw 190 with another pilot. Later in the month he was promoted to flight lieutenant and given command of one of the flights of the squadron. On 1 May, he was promoted squadron leader and made commander of No. 486 Squadron. The next day he recorded his final aerial victory, helping shoot down a four-engined flying boat near Groszenbrode. (Note: According to aviation historian Paul Sortehaug, this was most likely a Blohm & Voss Ha 139.) In June 1945, he was awarded the Distinguished Flying Cross; the citation published in The London Gazette read:

This officer has displayed the highest standard of devotion to duty. He has participated in a very large number of varied sorties during which much damage has been inflicted on such enemy targets as locomotives, barges, industrial buildings and mechanical transport. On one occasion, Flying Officer Sheddan was forced to bring his damaged aircraft down on the sea. He was subsequently adrift in the dinghy for 19 hours before being rescued. On resuming flying operations, Flying Officer Sheddan quickly showed that this experience had in no way diminished his zest for battle and he set a fine example of courage and resolution in pressing home his attack. Among his successes is the destruction of 3 enemy aircraft.

— London Gazette, No. 37125, 12 June 1945

No. 486 Squadron, with Sheddan still in command, was transferred to Copenhagen in Denmark, remaining there until July when it went back to Germany, stationed at Lübeck as part of the British Occupation Force. It returned to the United Kingdom in September and Sheddan's time as commander ended on 12 October 1945 with the disbandment of the squadron. He ended the war credited with shooting down four German aircraft and a share in three other aircraft destroyed, a total of five and a half aerial victories. He was also credited with destroying seven V-1 flying bombs with a share in an eighth.

== Later life ==
Sheddan remained in the service of the RNZAF until his discharge in April 1946. He was then placed in the Air Force Reserve until 1973. In civilian life, he worked as a farming contractor, first in Waimate and then in the Bay of Plenty doing shearing and fencing. He latterly worked as a pest exterminator in Wainui. He retired to Helensville in the early 1980s. With Norman Franks, he wrote his autobiography, which was published as Tempest Pilot in 1993. He died in Helensville on 9 December 2010, survived by two sons.

== See also ==
- List of World War II aces from New Zealand
