= Percy Beake =

Squadron Leader Percival Harold Beake, DFC (17 March 1917 – 25 June 2016) was a British RAF fighter pilot in World War II, and in command of No. 164 Squadron RAF from May 1944.
