= No. 164 Squadron RAF =

Defunct flying squadron of the Royal Air Force

No. 164 (Argentine–British) Squadron RAF
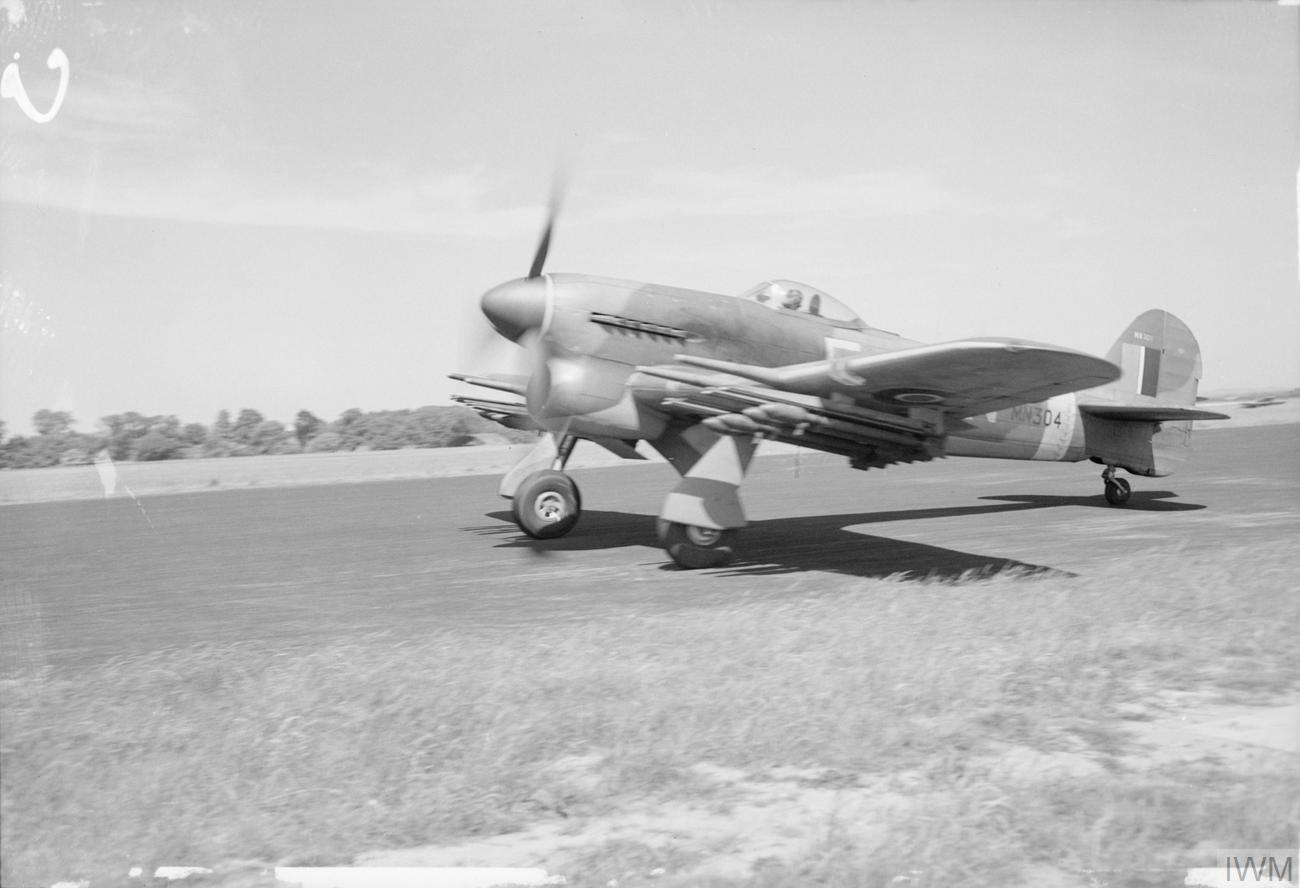
- Typhoon of No.164 Squadron take off from Thorney Island
- Active: 1 June 1918–4 July 1918; 6 April 1942–31 August 1946
- Country: United Kingdom
- Branch: Royal Air Force
- Type: Inactive
- Role: Fighter Squadron
- Nickname(s): Argentine-British
- Motto(s): "Firmes volamos" (Spanish) (Firmly we fly)
- Aircraft: Supermarine Spitfire; Hawker Hurricane; Hawker Typhoon

Insignia
- Squadron Badge heraldry: A lion passant guardant in front of a rising sun
- Squadron code: FJ

No. 164 (Argentine–British) Squadron was a fighter squadron of the Royal Air Force raised for service during the Second World War. It was a donation squadron, paid for by the British community living in Argentina. It operated mostly in a ground attack role, particularly during the Allied invasion of France and the subsequent advance in the Low Countries and Germany.

== History ==
=== First World War ===
No. 164 Squadron RAF was originally founded on 1 June 1918, but never received aircraft and was disbanded on 4 July 1918.

=== Second World War ===
No. 164 Squadron was reformed at Peterhead, in Aberdeenshire, on 6 April 1942 as a fighter squadron under the command of Squadron Leader T. Rowland. It was a gift squadron from the British community of Argentina. To reflect this, its motto was "Firmes volamos", which translated to "Firmly we fly" in English. The squadron's badge also referenced the Argentinian relationship with a lion passant on guard in front of a rising sun, the latter element being derived from the flag of Argentina.

Initially equipped with Supermarine Spitfire Mk Va fighters, the squadron became operational in early May. Now based at Skeabrae, its work at this time was mostly shipping patrols and with only the occasional engagement with the Luftwaffe. From September, it began to receive upgraded Spitfire Mk Vb fighters. In January 1943, No. 164 Squadron moved to Fairwood Common in South Wales to train as a ground-attack unit. For its new role, it was reequipped with Hawker Hurricane fighters armed with 40-mm cannons. After six months of training, the squadron finally began operations on 27 June, now commanded by Squadron Leader D. McKeown. It sought out German shipping and coastal targets but was also engaged in familiarisation with rockets which it began to use operationally on 20 August. On 2 September, in a combined operation with No. 137 Squadron, it attacked the lock gates at Zuid-Beveland. While one gate was destroyed, McKeown was killed in this sortie.

By the end of the year the squadron was working in a fighter-bomber role although its Hurricanes were now deemed insufficient for front line service in Europe. In January 1944, the squadron began to receive the Hawker Typhoon Mk Ib fighter, which were faster, more robust aircraft with greater firepower than their ageing Hurricanes. The phase out of Hurricanes was completed by March, at which time the Typhoons began to be used operationally on targets in France. In the prelude to the invasion of Normandy, Squadron Leader Percy Beake was put in charge of the squadron and it was used extensively in attacks on infrastructure in Normandy. On D-Day itself, 6 June 1944, its first confirmed victory over the Luftwaffe was achieved, when a Focke-Wulf Fw 190 fighter was shot down near Caen.

After providing support for the landing forces from southern England, the squadron moved to France in July, initially operating from Sommervieu. During the Battle of Normandy, No. 164 Squadron attacked German armour, and after the Allied breakout moved forward through northern France and Belgium in support of the 21st Army Group. Squadron Leader Ian Waddy succeeded Beake in August but after only a week in command was shot down and became a prisoner of war. Squadron Leader Remy Van Lierde was then appointed to command the squadron.

In March 1945, No, 164 Squadron operated in support of the crossing of the Rhine and the subsequent advance into Germany. After the surrender of Germany in May, the squadron returned to the United Kingdom and, now based at Turnhouse was under the control of No. 13 Group. Its operational role was changed to that of a fighter interceptor squadron, for which the Typhoons were not suitable, so the squadron converted to the Spitfire IX. On 31 August 1946, now stationed at Middle Wallop, the squadron was renumbered No. 63 Squadron, effectively disbanding No. 164 Squadron.

== Aircraft operated ==
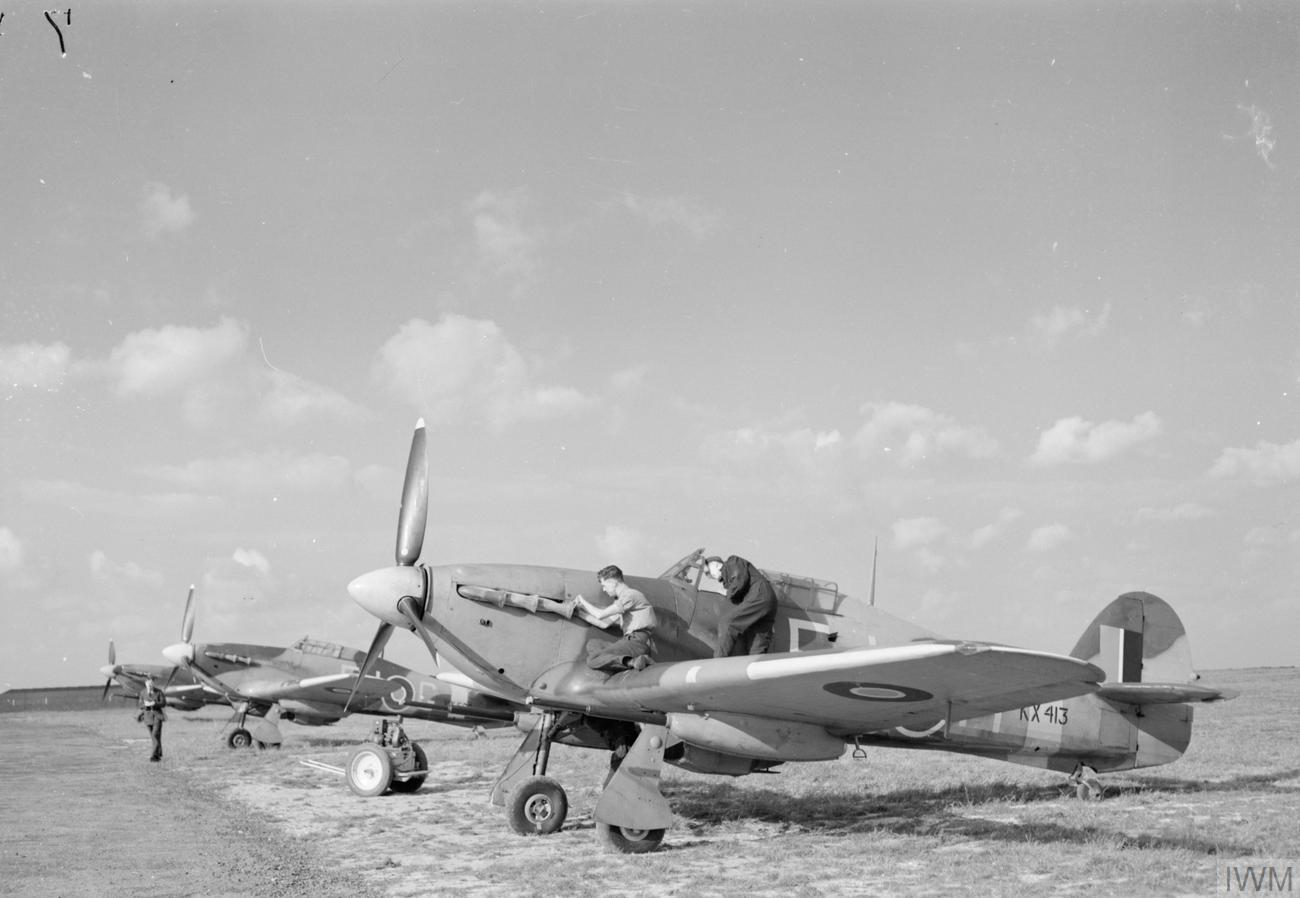
Three Hurricane Mark IVs of No. 164 Squadron undergoing servicing at Middle Wallop, Hampshire

No. 164 Squadron operated the following aircraft:

From	To	Aircraft
April 1942	September 1942	Supermarine Spitfire VA
September 1942	February 1943	Supermarine Spitfire VB
February 1943	May 1943	Hawker Hurricane IID
February 1943	February 1944	Hawker Hurricane IV
January 1944	May 1945	Hawker Typhoon IB
June 1945	July 1946	Supermarine Spitfire IX
July 1946	August 1946	Supermarine Spitfire LF XVIE

== See also ==
- List of Royal Air Force aircraft squadrons
