= Arthur Umbers =

New Zealand World War II flying ace

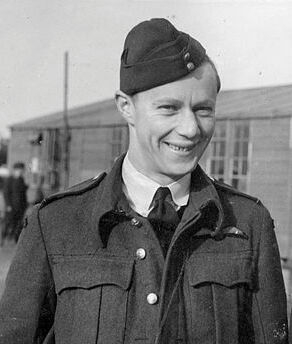
- Born: 30 June 1919; Dunedin, New Zealand
- Died: 14 February 1945 (aged 25); Meppen, Germany
- Burial place: Munster Heath War Cemetery, Germany
- Military career
- Allegiance: New Zealand
- Branch: Royal New Zealand Air Force
- Service years: 1940–1945
- Rank: Squadron Leader
- Nickname: Spike
- Service number: 404003
- Commands: No. 486 Squadron
- Conflicts: Second World War; Channel Front; Western Front (1944–1945); Operation Diver; Western Allied invasion of Germany
- Awards: Distinguished Flying Cross and bar

Arthur Ernest Umbers DFC & Bar (30 June 1919 – 14 February 1945) was a New Zealand flying ace of the Royal New Zealand Air Force (RNZAF) during the Second World War. He was credited with the destruction of five German aircraft as well at least fifteen, possibly as many as twenty-eight, V-1 flying bombs.

Born in Dunedin, Umbers joined the RNZAF in 1940. After completing his flight training, the latter part of which was received in Canada, he was posted to the Royal Air Force's No. 74 Squadron in August 1941 and then onto No. 486 Squadron, with which he flew extensively on both night operations and offensive sorties for nearly 18 months. After a rest period, during which he was a test pilot for Hawker Siddeley and then the Gloster Aircraft Company, he returned to operational flying in April 1944 with No. 3 Squadron. The squadron was equipped with the Hawker Tempest and when the Germans began launching V-1 flying bombs at England, it was tasked with intercepting them. Umbers was the first New Zealander to destroy a V-1. In December he returned to No. 486 Squadron as its commander. He was killed in action when his aircraft was hit by flak while attacking barges on the Dortmund-Ems Canal.

== Early life ==
Arthur Ernest Umbers, nicknamed 'Spike', was born on 30 June 1919 in Dunedin, New Zealand, the oldest son of Mr. R. A Umbers and his wife. He went to Green Island School and then Otago Boys' High School. After completing his schooling, he worked in Wellington for the New Zealand Government and later moved to Dunedin, where he was a clerk for the Tourist Bureau.

== Second World War ==
Umbers formally joined the Royal New Zealand Air Force on 24 November 1940, enlisting as an airman pilot with the service number 404003. After initial training at Levin, he proceeded to No. 1 Elementary Flying Training School at Taieri. In February the following year, he embarked for Canada for further flight training. This was undertaken at No. 6 Service Flying Training School near Dunnville. He earned his flying badge in June and was promoted to sergeant. He was subsequently commissioned as a pilot officer.

Proceeding onto the United Kingdom to serve with the Royal Air Force (RAF), Umbers was sent to No. 53 Operational Training Unit for familiarisation on the Supermarine Spitfire fighter. He was then posted to No. 74 Squadron in late August. At the time he joined the unit, it was based at Acklington, in the north of England, and was equipped with Spitfires. It saw little action for the next several weeks, mostly carrying out protective convoy patrols.

=== Service with No. 486 Squadron ===
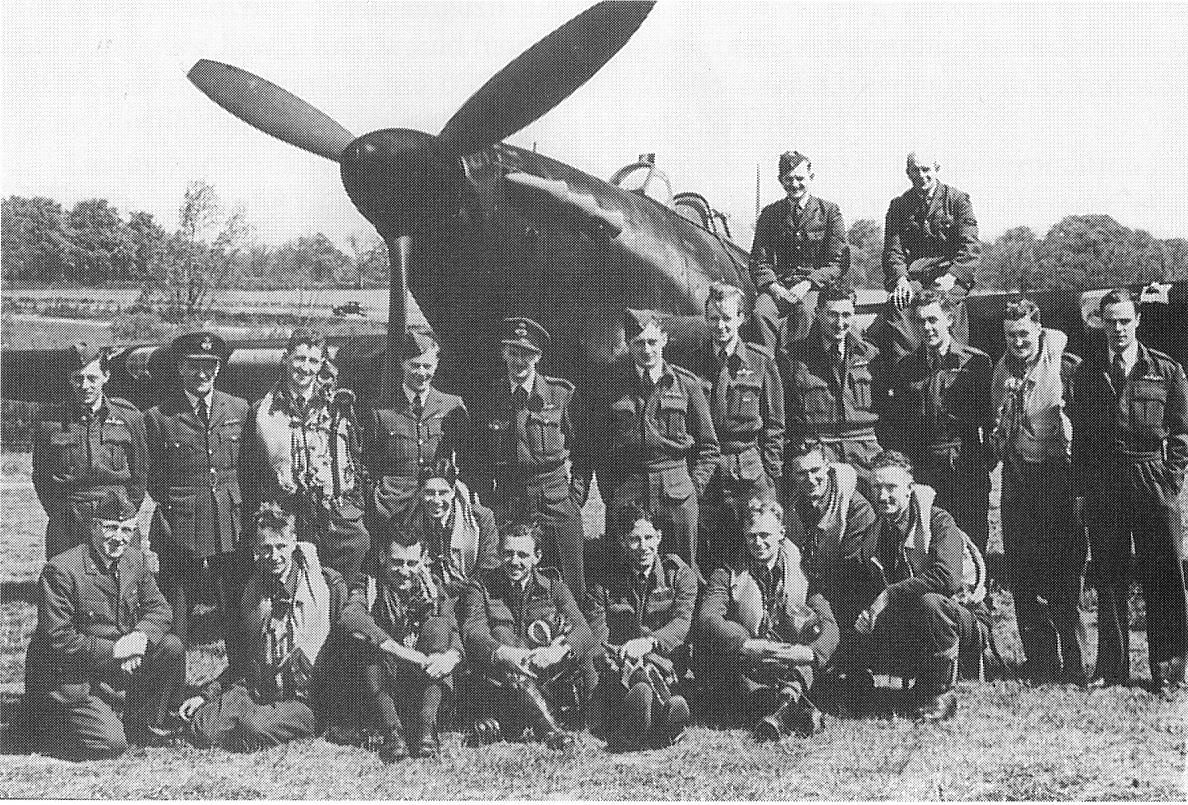
A group of No. 486 Squadron personnel with one of its Hawker Hurricanes; Umbers stands fourth left

In mid-March 1942, Umbers was transferred to the RAF's No. 486 (New Zealand) Squadron. This had been formed earlier in the month as the second New Zealand squadron in Fighter Command. It initially operated Hawker Hurricanes from Kirton-in-Lindsey in a night-fighting capacity. After a period of training, the first operational flight was undertaken by Flight Lieutenant Harvey Sweetman and Umbers on 27 April. The squadron was also involved with the experimental Turbinlite program, cooperating with No. 1451 Flight. This used a Douglas A-20 Havoc equipped with a searchlight in its nose. When operating interception missions at night, it would use its radar equipment to locate enemy aircraft, then illuminate them with the searchlight once spotted so that an accompanying Hurricane could endeavour to shoot it down. Umbers was in charge of one of the Hurricane detachments involved in the program, which was ultimately unsuccessful.

The squadron's regular night-fighting operations were mostly uneventful. After a number of weeks it was switched to day-fighters, converting to the Hawker Typhoon. From October, and now operating from West Malling and then Tangmere, it was regularly flying missions intercepting incoming Luftwaffe Rhubarb missions. On 22 December, while Umbers, now holding the rank of flying officer, and his wingman were on patrol, a Dornier Do 217 medium bomber was spotted 5 miles (8.0 km) away. He and his wingman attacked, setting the engines of the Do 217 on fire and it crashed into the sea.

Umbers was promoted to flight lieutenant in January 1943, which coincided with him taking over as one of No. 486 Squadron's flight commanders. The squadron was switched to offensive operations in April 1943 and started flying to occupied Europe, escorting bombers. On 9 April, Umbers was credited with a quarter share in two Focke-Wulf Fw 190 fighters that were destroyed over Étretat. He shot down a Fw 190 on 24 June and was credited with another as probably destroyed on 15 July. The squadron later started flying in a fighter-bomber role, attacking German shipping. Umbers was subsequently awarded the Distinguished Flying Cross (DFC), which was officially announced on 7 September in The London Gazette. The published citation read:

This officer has taken part in a very large number of varied operations. In operations against shipping he has always pressed home his attacks with great vigour and has obtained several hits. In air combat, Flight Lieutenant Umbers has displayed great keenness and determination, setting a fine example. He has shared in the destruction of an enemy bomber.

— London Gazette, No. 36161, 7 September 1943

On 24 September Umbers damaged a Fw 190 southeast of Trouville and shortly afterwards was taken off operations. He was briefly assigned to the headquarters of Fighter Command in a staff role but in late October he was sent to Hawker Siddeley, the aircraft manufacturer, as a test pilot. Harvey Sweetman, his former flight commander, was already there flying in the same capacity. Umbers fulfilled a similar role for the Gloster Aircraft Company from November through to April 1944, at which time he was posted to No. 3 Squadron, at the time operating the Hawker Tempest fighter.

=== Defending against V-1 flying bombs ===
No. 3 Squadron's operational role was to fly intruder missions to France in preparation for the forthcoming invasion of Normandy. However, when the Germans started launching V-1 flying bombs at England, beginning on the night of 12–13 June, the squadron was tasked to deal with the threat as the Tempest was the fastest fighter plane available to the RAF. Along with No. 486 Squadron, also equipped with Tempests, it formed No. 150 Wing, operating from Newchurch as part of Operation Diver, the British countermeasure program to the V-1s. Umbers, one of the squadron's flight commanders, was the first New Zealander to destroy a V-1, while on patrol on the morning of 16 June. It was one of twelve V-1s that were dealt with by No. 3 Squadron that day. The following month he was awarded a bar to his DFC, which was presented to him by King George VI. The published citation read:

This officer has led his flight on very many sorties during which military transport, railway communications, ammunition dumps and other targets on the ground have been attacked with excellent results; on one occasion 8 locomotives were destroyed. By his great skill and unbeatable determination, Flight Lieutenant Umbers has played a worthy part in the successes achieved. He is a most inspiring leader.

— London Gazette, No. 36625, 25 July 1944

Over the next several weeks, Umbers accounted for at least fifteen V-1s in total, including three on one sortie in August. It is possible that he may have destroyed as many as twenty-eight V-1s and his success was such he was interviewed by the BBC for its Nine O'Clock News radio program. By September, the squadron was flying as part of No. 122 Wing, supporting the Allied troops as they advanced into France. He was also credited with damaging a Messerschmitt Me 262 jet fighter near Nijmegen on 21 October.

=== Squadron command ===
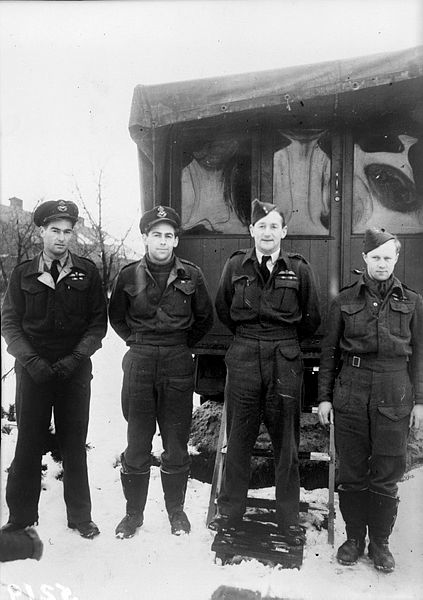
Umbers stands far right with fellow squadron commanders of No. 122 Wing; Evan Mackie (first left), commander of No. 80 Squadron and Keith Thiele (second left), commander of No. 3 Squadron; the wing commander, Patrick Jameson stands next to Umbers; all were New Zealanders

Promoted to squadron leader, Umbers was given command of his former unit, No. 486 Squadron, on 11 December. At the time, it was part of the Second Tactical Air Force, flying from the Volkel airfield in Holland. On 1 January 1945, the Luftwaffe launched Operation Bodenplatte, a coordinated strike against the Allied airfields in the Low Countries. Umbers, in the air at the time and leading a reconnaissance flight, intercepted and destroyed a Fw 190 and a Messerschmitt Bf 109 fighter near Helmond. He was subject to friendly fire on 13 January when, while supporting the United States 1st Army in the St. Vith area, his Tempest was damaged by American anti-aircraft fire. He crashed behind Allied lines and had a heated argument with American troops over the incident. Ten days later, near Rheine airfield in Germany, he shot down a Bf 109.

Umbers was killed on 14 February while attacking barges on the Dortmund-Ems Canal, near Meppen. His Tempest was hit by flak, rolled out of control into the ground and exploded. He had been due to go to England, where his wife was about to give birth to their child. He is buried at Munster Heath War Cemetery in Germany.

At the time of his death, Umbers was credited with having shot down five German aircraft, with one of these shared with another pilot. He is also credited with one aircraft probably destroyed and two damaged. He is responsible for having destroyed between fifteen and twenty-eight V-1 flying bombs, with sources having varying totals.
