= Day fighter =

Fighter aircraft designed for use in daytime

A day fighter is a fighter aircraft equipped only to fight during the day. More specifically, it refers to a multi-purpose aircraft that does not include equipment for fighting at night (such as a radar and specialized avionics), although it is sometimes used to refer to some interceptors as well.

The term is an example of a retronym: before the development of effective dedicated night fighter aircraft early in World War II, in effect, all fighter aircraft that were not specifically modified for night combat were day fighters.

== World War II ==
Examples of planes that were classified as day fighters were the Supermarine Spitfire and Messerschmitt Bf 109. Both were excellent interceptors, but were also found in roles such as fighter-bomber and reconnaissance. However, the weight of the radar systems needed to effectively track down enemy bombers at night was such that these smaller aircraft simply couldn't carry them given the electronics of the day. This led to the use of twin-engine aircraft like the Bristol Beaufighter and Messerschmitt Bf 110 as dedicated night fighters, at which point the term day fighter began to be used.

Some lighter designs like the Hawker Hurricane and Focke-Wulf Fw 190 were also adapted to night fighting after a fashion, lacking radar and relying on searchlights or fires on the ground to illuminate their targets. These were preferred over the Spitfire and Bf 109 largely due to their wide-track landing gear, which made landing at night somewhat safer. Although such designs were in service throughout the war, they proved to have little real effectiveness compared to the dedicated night fighter designs.

Late in the war the considerable advances in radar technology, notably the introduction of the cavity magnetron, allowed for much smaller radar sets. At the same time, aircraft engines had roughly doubled in performance over the same period. This led to the late-war introduction of single-engine night fighters like the Grumman F6F, Vought F4U, as well as more agile twin-engine planes such as the Lockheed P-38, with some success.

== Post-war ==
As the size and weight of night-fighting equipment remained considerable in comparison to airframe size and engine power, the day fighter remained a part of front-line air forces into the 1960s. In the immediate post-war era, designs like the North American F-86 Sabre, Mikoyan-Gurevich MiG-15 and Hawker Hunter typified the day-fighter role. These were followed by similar supersonic designs in the early 1960s, including the Lockheed F-104 Starfighter and Mikoyan-Gurevich MiG-21.

However, as the size of basic fighters grew, along with their engine power, the relative cost of carrying night-fighting equipment fell until most designs carried such equipment. Lightweight fighters without full night equipment such as the F-5 Freedom Fighter/Tiger II are still used by nations that lack the money to acquire advanced fighter aircraft.

The last of the purpose-designed day fighters were the original American General Dynamics F-16 Fighting Falcon and the Northrop YF-17 that competed for the Lightweight Fighter contract, which had the goal of providing the USAF with an inexpensive day fighter that could be purchased in great numbers to establish air superiority. The designs originated in a mid-1960s effort known as the "Advanced Day Fighter". After winning the contract the F-16 quickly matured into a much more capable multi-role aircraft and can no longer be considered a day fighter. Likewise, the YF-17 evolved into the much larger McDonnell Douglas F/A-18 Hornet and Boeing F/A-18E/F Super Hornet, which is used in the 2020s by the United States Navy as the primary all-weather combat aircraft.

== See also ==
- Night fighter
- Heavy fighter
- Interceptor aircraft
