= Peter Hall (RNZAF officer) =

New Zealand flying ace during World War II

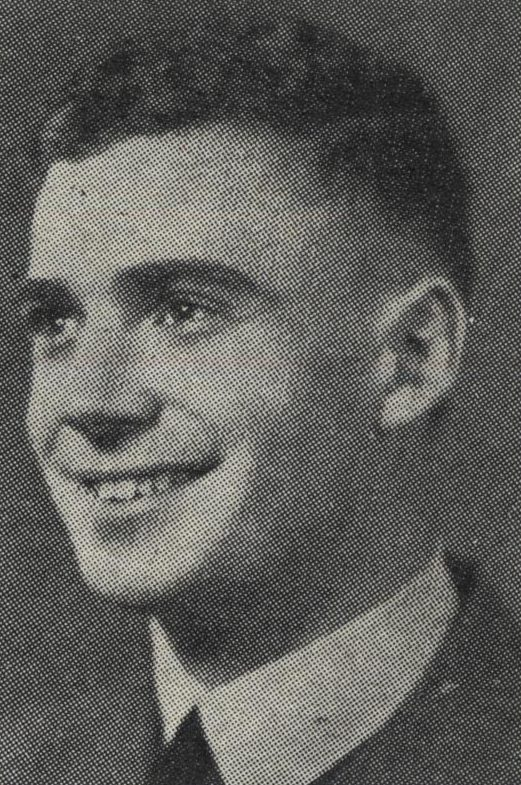
- Born: 16 May 1922; Ōpōtiki, New Zealand
- Died: 22 May 2010 (aged 88); Cumbria, England
- Military career
- Allegiance: New Zealand
- Branch: Royal New Zealand Air Force
- Service years: 1941–1945
- Rank: Flight Lieutenant
- Units: No. 140 Squadron; No. 488 Squadron
- Conflicts: Second World War
- Awards: Distinguished Flying Cross & Bar

Peter Francis Locker Hall, DFC & Bar (16 May 1922 – 22 May 2010) was a New Zealand flying ace of the Royal New Zealand Air Force (RNZAF) during the Second World War. He is credited with the confirmed destruction of eight German aircraft and one more probably destroyed.

Born in Ōpōtiki, Hall joined the RNZAF in 1941. After completing flight training he went to the United Kingdom to serve with the Royal Air Force, initially with 140 Squadron. He was later posted to 488 (New Zealand) Squadron, shooting down several German aircraft over England and France, for which he was awarded the Distinguished Flying Cross and Bar. He was repatriated to New Zealand in early 1945. He later worked in the aviation industry in England before starting a furniture business. Hall died in 2010, aged 88.

== Early life ==
Born in Ōpōtiki, New Zealand, on 16 May 1922, Peter Francis Locker Hall was the son of a clergyman. He became interested in flying in 1928 when his father bought him an aeroplane ride with Australian aviation pioneer Charles Kingsford Smith. After completing his education, he worked as a school teacher.

== Second World War ==
Hall enlisted in the Royal New Zealand Air Force (RNZAF) in July 1941 and after flying training was sent to England to serve with the Royal Air Force (RAF). He was posted to No. 140 Squadron, which had formed at Benson and operated photo-reconnaissance Supermarine Spitfires, and flew a number of sorties over occupied Europe.

=== No. 488 (NZ) Squadron ===
In July 1943, Hall was transferred to No. 488 (NZ) Squadron, which operated De Havilland Mosquito night-fighters from Bradwell Bay in Essex. With his navigator, Flying Officer D. Marriott, he was patrolling over southeast England on the night of 25 November, when ground radar directed him onto an enemy aircraft. Identified as a Messerschmitt Me 410 heavy fighter, he pursued it across the English Channel to just off Calais when he opened fire and saw an explosion on the fuselage of the aircraft. Although he did not see it crash, the aircraft was later confirmed as destroyed. On the night of 24 February 1944, Hall and his navigator were credited with a Dornier Do 217 medium bomber as probably destroyed; it had been caught in searchlights and Hall observed smoke coming from one of its engines when he opened fire but lost sight of it when making another attack. Later in the patrol, he shot down a Junkers Ju 188 medium bomber close to Wadhurst.

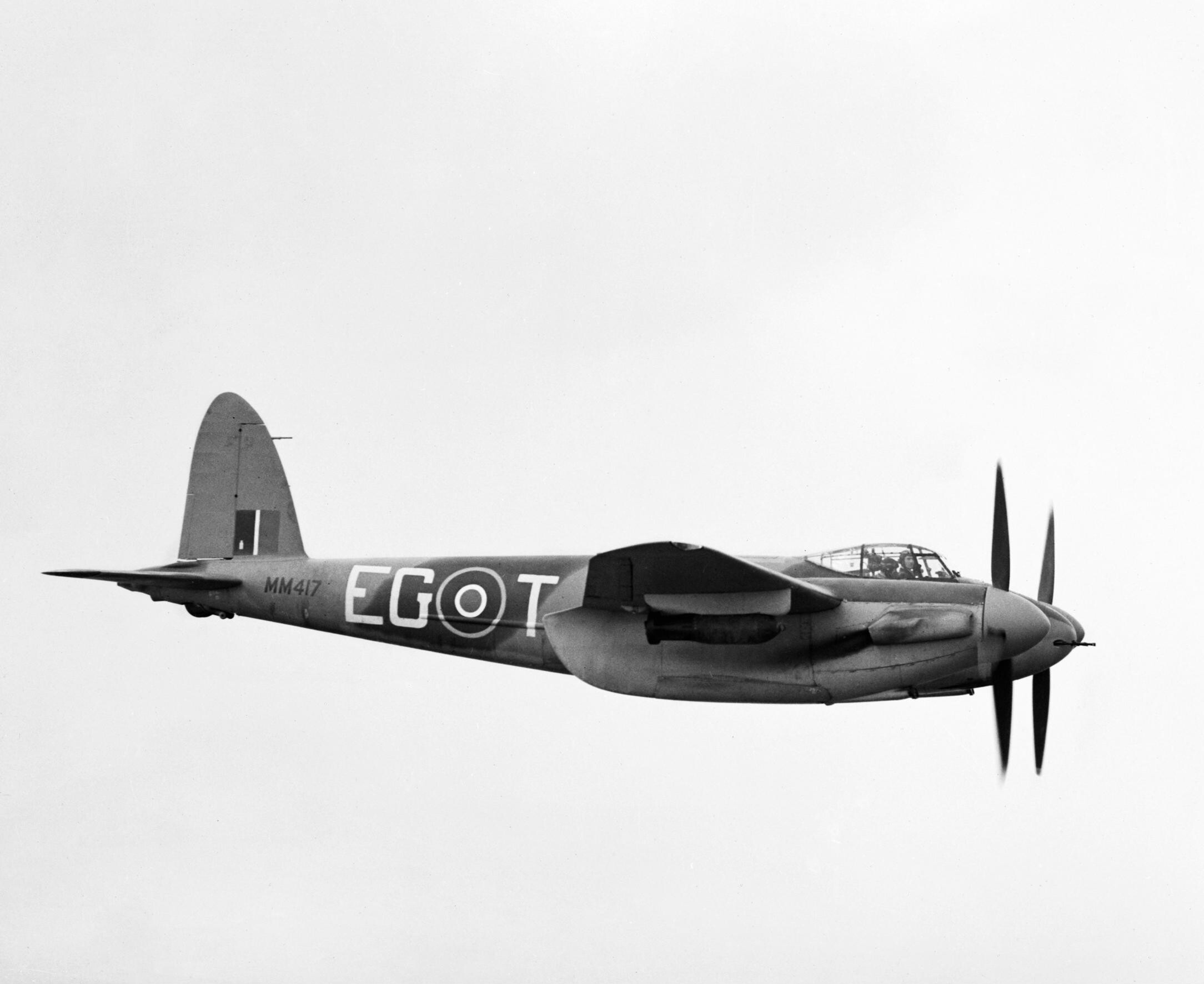
A de Havilland Mosquito

Following the invasion of Normandy, No. 488 Squadron began performing offensive operations, operating from the permanent RAF station at Zeals, in Wiltshire. The squadron patrolled over the landing beaches, protecting the land forces from night attacks mounted by German bombers but also carrying out intruder missions, seeking targets of opportunity such as transport vehicles and German aircraft. On the night of 14 June, Hall destroyed a Junkers Ju 88 medium bomber near Saint-Lô, in France. His own Mosquito was damaged in the encounter and he had to fly back to Zeals on one engine. A few nights later, another Ju 88 was shot down by Hall in the same area.

The following month, Hall and Marriott were credited with shooting down two Ju 88s in a single sortie on the night of 28 July, in the area of Vire. On 1 August, with the squadron flying from Colerne, near Bristol, he destroyed a Ju 88. Hall's success was fortunate, for he was in pursuit of another Ju 88 at the time and his victim had flown through his field of fire. On the night of 5 August, he was credited with the destruction of a Do 217. For their exploits, Hall, now a flight lieutenant, and Marriott were awarded the Distinguished Flying Cross (DFC) on 19 September. The joint citation, published in The London Gazette read:

As pilot and observer respectively these officers have participated in many sorties. Throughout they have displayed commendable skill and keenness. They have destroyed 4 enemy aircraft.

— London Gazette, No. 36706, 19 September 1944.

Hall was the first New Zealander to be awarded the DFC for operations while flying with No. 488 Squadron. This was followed by the award of a Bar to Hall and Marriott's DFCs just two weeks later. The joint citation, published in early October, for their Bars read:

As pilot and observer respectively these officers continue to display the highest standard of skill and gallantry. Recently, within a short period they have destroyed 4 enemy aircraft, bringing their victories to 8.

— London Gazette, No. 36728, 3 October 1944.

Hall's period of service with the RAF ended in early 1945 and he was repatriated to New Zealand and discharged from the RNZAF. Along with Marriott, Hall ended the war credited with eight confirmed aerial victories and one probable.

== Later life ==
After the war, Hall went to university and studied for a Bachelor of Engineering degree. He returned to England and joined the aircraft manufacturer de Havilland as an aerodynamicist. Hall regularly returned to New Zealand, including on the first flight to the country of the De Havilland Comet airliner. He left de Havilland in 1968 and started work for Hawker Siddeley Aviation as a sales director. In 1972 he left the aviation industry and established an award-winning woodcraft and furniture business in Cumbria. He enjoyed such a good reputation that at one point he was commissioned to create a bowl for Diana, Princess of Wales.

Hall died in Cumbria on 22 May 2010. His wife Mary had died the previous year and they were survived by their three children.
