= List of World War II aces credited with 9 victories =

Fighter aces in World War II had tremendously varying kill scores, affected as they were by many factors: the pilot's skill level, the performance of the airplane the pilot flew and the planes they flew against, how long they served, their opportunity to meet the enemy in the air (Allied to Axis disproportion), whether they were the formation's leader or a wingman, the standards their air service brought to the awarding of victory credits, et cetera.

== Aces ==
This background, along with the symbol "†", indicates that the pilot was killed in action, missing in action, died of wounds, or was killed in a flying accident during World War II.

Name	Country	Service(s)	Aerial victories	Other aerial victories	Notes
Fletcher E. Adams	United States	U.S. Army Air Forces	9.5		
Frederick Alan Aikman	Canada	Royal Canadian Air Force	9.5		
Ernest E. Bankey, Jr.	United States	U.S. Army Air Forces	9.5		(+8 ground kills)
William M. Banks	United States	U.S. Army Air Forces	9.5		
Leonard J. Check	United States	U.S. Navy	9.5		
Edward Coate	Australia	Royal Australian Air Force	9.5		
Ernest C. Fiebelkorn	United States	U.S. Army Air Forces	9.5		possibly just 9 (+2 ground kills)
Aleksander Gabszewicz	Poland	Polish Air Force; Royal Air Force	9.5		
Michał Maciejowski	Poland	Polish Air Force; Royal Air Force	9.5		
Dale F. Spencer	United States	U.S. Army Air Forces	9.5		(+.5 ground kill)
Robert C. Coats	United States	U.S. Navy	9 1/3		
Mirosław Ferić	Poland	Polish Air Force; Royal Air Force	9 1/3		
Henryk Szczęsny	Poland	Polish Air Force; Royal Air Force	9 1/3		
Charles R. Bond	United States	American Volunteer Group	9 1/4		
Hans-Ulrich Rudel	Germany	Luftwaffe	9+		Also a top ground attack pilot, with 2000+ targets destroyed
Stephen W. Andrew	United States	U.S. Army Air Forces	9		(+6.5 ground kills)
Emanuele Annoni	Kingdom of Italy	Regia Aeronautica	9		
Lee "Buddy" Archer	United States	U.S. Army Air Forces	9		(+6 ground kills) Only African-American ace in WWII
Roderick Bowes	Australia	Royal Australian Air Force	9		
Eric Barwell	United Kingdom	Royal Air Force	9		
Edgar R. Bassett †	United States	U.S. Navy	9		
Norman R. Berree	United States	U.S. Navy	9		
William R. Bland	United States	U.S. Navy	9		
George E. Bostwick	United States	U.S. Army Air Forces	9		(+6 ground kills)
Mark K. Bright	United States	U.S. Navy	9		
Paul D. Buie	United States	U.S. Navy	9		
Lajos Buday †	Hungary	Royal Hungarian Air Force	9		
Henry A. Carey, Jr.	United States	U.S. Navy	9		
Frederick F. Champlin	United States	U.S. Army Air Forces	9		
Aleksander Chudek	Poland	Polish Air Force; Royal Air Force	9		
Wilfred Clouston	New Zealand	Royal Air Force	9		
Arthur Clowes	United Kingdom	Royal Air Force	9		+1 shared
Frank J. Collins	United States	U.S. Army Air Forces	9		possibly just 8
William M. Collins, Jr.	United States	U.S. Navy	9		
Richard L. Cormier	United States	U.S. Navy	9		
Louis Edward Curdes	United States	U.S. Army Air Forces	9		
Perry A. Dahl	United States	U.S. Army Air Forces	9		
Jefferson J. DeBlanc	United States	U.S. Marine Corps	9		Ace in a day
Richard W. Dunkin	United States	U.S. Army Air Forces	9		
Charles H. Dyson	United Kingdom	Royal Air Force	9		Ace in a day (six minutes)
Richard T. Eastmond	United States	U.S. Navy	9		
Robert A. Elder	United States	U.S. Army Air Forces	9		(+2 ground kills)
Hugh Eliot †	United Kingdom	Royal Air Force	9		
Thomas Elsdon	United Kingdom	Royal Air Force	9		
Eugene H. Emmons	United States	U.S. Army Air Forces	9		
Jan Falkowski	Poland	Polish Air Force; Royal Air Force	9		
Grover E. Fanning	United States	U.S. Army Air Forces	9		
Edward L. Feightner	United States	U.S. Navy	9		
Sylvan Feld	United States	U.S. Army Air Forces	9		
Joseph M. Forester	United States	U.S. Army Air Forces	9		
Marvin J. Franger	United States	U.S. Navy	9		
Doris C. Freeman	United States	U.S. Navy	9		
Kenneth W. Gallup	United States	U.S. Army Air Forces	9		(+2 ground kills)
Antoni Głowacki	Poland	Polish Air Force; Royal Air Force	9		Ace in a day
Thomas S. Harris	United States	U.S. Navy	9		
Frederick R. Haviland, Jr.	United States	U.S. Army Air Forces	9		(+6 ground kills)
Hajo Herrmann	Germany	Luftwaffe	9		Night fighter ace
Allen E. Hill	United States	U.S. Army Air Forces	9		
Bertie Hoare	United Kingdom	Royal Air Force	9		Night fighter ace
Frank D. Hurlburt	United States	U.S. Army Air Forces	9		
Ernest Joyce †	New Zealand	Royal New Zealand Air Force	9		(+ 2 probably destroyed)
James Timothy Kearney	Australia	Royal Australian Air Force	9		
George C. Kiser	United States	U.S. Army Air Forces	9		
Richard Lee †	United Kingdom	Royal Air Force	9		
Joseph J. Lesicka	United States	U.S. Army Air Forces	9		
Christopher L. Magee	United States	U.S. Marine Corps	9		
John MacKenzie	New Zealand	Royal Air Force	9		(+3 probably destroyed)
James Meaker †	Ireland	Royal Air Force	9		
Norman Macqueen †	United Kingdom	Royal Air Force	9		
Louis A. Menard, Jr.	United States	U.S. Navy	9		
Virgil K. Merony	United States	U.S. Army Air Forces	9		
William Millington †	Australia	Royal Air Force	9		
Stanley B. Morrill	United States	U.S. Army Air Forces	9		
Wolfgang Neu	Germany	Luftwaffe	9		
Walter Omiccioli	Kingdom of Italy	Regia Aeronautica	9		
Edmund F. Overend	United States	American Volunteer Group; U.S. Marine Corps	9		victories with 2 air forces
Lloyd J. Overfield	United States	U.S. Army Air Forces	9		
Joel B. Paris III	United States	U.S. Army Air Forces	9		
Gartrell Parker	United Kingdom	Royal Air Force	9		
Paul Rabone †	New Zealand	Royal Air Force	9		
Eugene D. Redmond	United States	U.S. Navy	9		
William Norman Reed	United States	American Volunteer Group; U.S. Army Air Forces	9		victories with 2 air forces
Daniel R. Rehm, Jr.	United States	U.S. Navy	9		
Eugene P. Roberts	United States	U.S. Army Air Forces	9		
Meryl M. Smith	United States	U.S. Army Air Forces	9		
Robert T. Smith	United States	American Volunteer Group	9		
Natalino Stabile	Kingdom of Italy	Regia Aeronautica	9	+ 1 in Spanish Civil War	
James S. Stewart	United States	U.S. Navy	9		
John S. Stewart	United States	U.S. Army Air Forces	9		
Franklin C. Thomas, Jr.	United States	U.S. Marine Corps	9		
Arthur Van Haren, Jr.	United States	U.S. Navy	9		
Adrian Warburton †	United Kingdom	Royal Air Force	9		ace while flying aircraft configured for reconnaissance missions
Benjamin F. Warmer	United States	U.S. Army Air Forces	9		
Percy Weaver †	United Kingdom	Royal Air Force	9		
Robert H. White	United States	U.S. Army Air Forces	9		
Isamu Kashiide	Japan	Imperial Japanese Army	9		claims 26 B-29s and 7 Soviet fighters
Judge E. Wolfe	United States	U.S. Army Air Forces	9		
Gheorghe Popescu Ciocanel	Kingdom of Romania	Royal Romanian Air Force	9		
Stefan Greceanu	Kingdom of Romania	Royal Romanian Air Force	9		
Gheorghe Cocebas	Kingdom of Romania	Royal Romanian Air Force	9		
Andrei Radulescu	Kingdom of Romania	Royal Romanian Air Force	9		
