= George Jameson (RNZAF officer) =

New Zealand World War II flying ace (1921–1998)

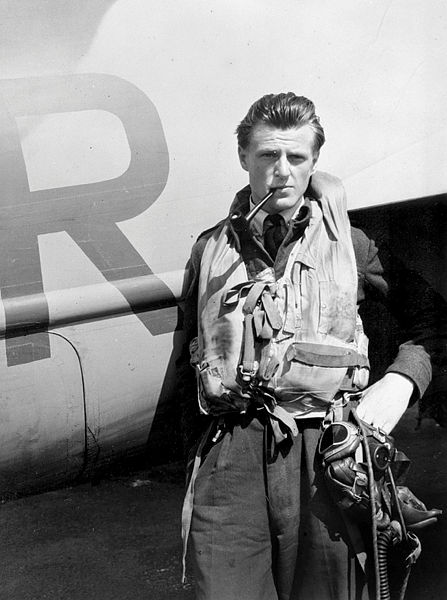
- Born: 20 November 1921; Christchurch, New Zealand
- Died: 20 May 1998 (aged 76); Rotherham, New Zealand
- Military career
- Allegiance: New Zealand
- Branch: Royal New Zealand Air Force
- Service years: 1941–1945
- Rank: Flight Lieutenant
- Nickname: Jamie
- Service number: 41479
- Units: No. 488 Squadron; No. 125 Squadron
- Conflicts: Second World War; Channel Front; Operation Overlord
- Awards: Distinguished Service Order; Distinguished Flying Cross

George Esmond Jameson, DSO, DFC (20 November 1921 – 20 May 1998) was a New Zealand flying ace of the Royal New Zealand Air Force (RNZAF) during the Second World War, who is credited with the destruction of eleven enemy aircraft and two damaged. He was the highest scoring New Zealand night fighter pilot of the war.

Born in Christchurch, Jameson joined the RNZAF in 1941. After completing flight training he went to the United Kingdom to serve with the Royal Air Force. Flying a Bristol Beaufighter night fighter with No. 125 Squadron, he destroyed three German bombers over England and Wales. He was awarded the Distinguished Flying Cross for these exploits. He later served with No. 488 Squadron, shooting down several enemy aircraft over France, including four in one sortie in July 1944, for which he was awarded the Distinguished Service Order. He was repatriated to New Zealand in September 1944 to run the family farm after the death of his father. He died in a farming accident at the age of 76.

== Early life ==
George Esmond Jameson, known as Jamie, was born on 20 November 1921 in Christchurch, New Zealand. He was one of four children of R. Leslie Jameson, who farmed at Rotherham in Canterbury, and his wife. He was educated at Waihi School in Winchester before going onto Christ's College in Christchurch.

== Second World War ==
Joining the Royal New Zealand Air Force (RNZAF) in early 1941 and allocated the service number 41479, Jameson received his flight training in Canada under the Commonwealth Air Training Scheme, before proceeding to the United Kingdom to serve with the Royal Air Force (RAF). While in Canada, Jameson became acquainted with fellow future flying ace Evan Mackie, who would later describe him as "really capable".

Posted to No. 125 Squadron, which operated Bristol Beaufighters from Fairwood Common in a night fighting role, in June 1942, Jameson soon found success. On the night of 27/28 July, he shot down a Heinkel He 111 medium bomber 15 miles (24 km) from Cardigan, part of a raid approaching the Midlands via the Irish Sea. His Beaufighter was damaged in the encounter, receiving return fire from the bomber's gunner. A week later he destroyed another He 111, this time near Milford Haven. In late October, he claimed a Junkers Ju 88 bomber as damaged. By this time, he was holding the rank of flying officer and in recognition of his successes over the preceding few months, he was awarded the Distinguished Flying Cross (DFC) in November. The published citation read:

This officer is a first class pilot whose skill has enabled him to destroy 2 enemy aircraft at night. His keenness and devotion to duty have set a praiseworthy example.

— London Gazette, No. 35795, 24 November 1942.

In February 1943, and with directions provided by radar, Jameson located a Dornier Do 217 bomber and shot up one of its engines. Another enemy aircraft approached, forcing Jameson to veer off but he was able to verify the destruction of the bomber he had attacked, which was part of a group of around 30 bombers raiding targets in south Wales and southwest England. For a time Jameson was part of a detachment of the squadron that was based at Peterhead in Scotland, intercepting German bombers targeting shipping in the North Sea. He was taken off flying operations later in the year and sent to an Operational Training Unit on instructing duties.

=== Service with No. 488 (NZ) Squadron ===
Early in 1944 Jameson was posted to No. 488 Squadron, which was staffed with mainly New Zealand flying personnel. It operated the two-seater De Havilland Mosquito from Bradwell Bay in Essex in a defensive night fighting role. Jameson, by now a flight lieutenant, was paired up with Flying Officer Norman Crookes, a British radar operator whom he had worked with while at No. 125 Squadron.

Following the invasion of Normandy the squadron began performing in an offensive role, operating from the permanent RAF station at Zeals, Wiltshire. It patrolled over the landing beaches, protecting the land forces from night attacks mounted by German bombers, and also carried out intruder missions, seeking out targets of opportunity such as transport vehicles and enemy aircraft. In this capacity Jameson, guided by Crooks using his radar set, destroyed a Messerschmitt Me 410 night fighter over Normandy in the very early hours of 25 June. A Ju 88 was destroyed just after midnight on 29 June; it had been attacking shipping off Caen. The ships then used their anti-aircraft weapons on Jameson's Mosquito, damaging its tail fin. From early July, the squadron began operating from a temporary station at Colerne, Wiltshire. The weather for most of the month was poor so there was little action until towards the end of July, at which time German air activity increased.

In a single flight, on 30 July, Jameson and Crookes destroyed four enemy aircraft while patrolling over Normandy. For the first, at about 5:05am, just before dawn, ground radar directed them to a Ju 88 and on making visual confirmation, Jameson shot it down. The Ju 88 was observed to crash 5 miles (8.0 km) south of Caen. He quickly sighted another Ju 88 and started pursuing it. Partway through the chase he saw another Ju 88 and switched targets. He set the newly spotted Ju 88 ablaze with bursts of cannon fire. Continuing with the patrol, he and Crookes saw yet another Ju 88 and took up chase, which saw both aircraft descend to treetop level. After Jameson opened fire with his cannon, he saw strikes on the Ju 88 and it nosedived into a field. He began making his way back over Caen and in doing so Crookes identified two aircraft on his radar set. Selecting one to pursue, Jameson closed his Mosquito in and saw a Do 217 about 4,000 yards (3,700 m) away. Despite the enemy aircraft heading into cloud, it was still being tracked by radar and Jameson was able to follow and open fire on regaining sight of the Do 217. His target crashed into a field below at about 5:25am. When they landed the Mosquito back at Colerne, it was practically empty of fuel. His exploits in shooting down four aircraft, the most in a single sortie for a night fighter pilot, were widely reported at the time although without identifying him personally.

On 4 August, flying over Saint-Lô, Jameson was directed to a Ju 88 that was dispensing radar countermeasures. Despite the Ju 88 taking evasive action, he was able to score hits in the cockpit area and the aircraft spun into the ground. Just after midnight on 7 August, he destroyed a Ju 88 which dived into the ground near Avranches. He had earlier in the night had an encounter with another Ju 88, which he claimed as damaged, having seen strikes from his cannon fire on the aircraft's fuselage although it was able to evade the pursuing Mosquito.

=== Repatriation ===
The claim of 7 August was to be the last of the war for Jameson. His father had died earlier in the year and at the request of Jameson's mother, he was repatriated to New Zealand in order to run the family farm. One brother, a Military Medal recipient serving with the 26th Battalion, had been killed earlier in the war and the other, who also joined the RNZAF, had died in an aircraft crash.

Jameson arrived back in New Zealand in September. The same month, his award of the Distinguished Service Order (DSO) for his sortie of 30 July was announced; for his role that day, Crookes was awarded a bar to a DFC he had received earlier in the war. Jameson was officially discharged from the RNZAF in February 1945. He finished the war credited with eleven enemy aircraft destroyed and two damaged, the highest scoring New Zealand night fighter pilot of the conflict. He was invested with the DSO that he was awarded in September 1944 in a ceremony presided over by Governor-General Sir Bernard Freyberg at the Christchurch municipal offices in November 1946.

== Later life ==
The running of the family farm, named Nukiwai, at Rotherham occupied the rest of Jameson's life. It was a 1,760 acres (7.1 km^{2}) property on which cattle and sheep were grazed. He died, at the age of 76, in an accident on the farm involving a bulldozer on 20 May 1998. His wartime effects were donated by his son to the Air Force Museum at Wigram.
