= George Jameson =

George Jameson may refer to:

- George Jamesone, or Jameson, Scottish painter
- George Jameson (RNZAF officer), New Zealand flying ace
