= Kenneth Stewart (RNZAF officer) =

Second World War flying ace

- Born: 7 October 1915; Dunedin, New Zealand
- Died: 3 August 1960 (aged 44); Dunedin, New Zealand
- Military career
- Allegiance: New Zealand
- Branch: Royal New Zealand Air Force
- Service years: 1941–1945
- Rank: Flight Lieutenant
- Nickname: Chunky
- Service number: 413145
- Unit: No. 488 Squadron
- Conflicts: Second World War
- Awards: Distinguished Flying Cross

Kenneth William Stewart, DFC (7 October 1915 – 3 August 1960) was a flying ace of the Royal New Zealand Air Force (RNZAF) during the Second World War. He was officially credited with the destruction of five German aircraft.

Born and educated in Dunedin, Stewart was a lawyer when he joined the RNZAF in 1941. After receiving some flight training at Wigram, the following year he was sent to the United Kingdom to complete his training and serve with the Royal Air Force. He performed instructing duties for several months before training as a night fighter pilot and being posted to No. 488 Squadron in October 1944. He and his radar operator Harold Brumby achieved a number of aerial victories during the final six months of the war in Europe. In the postwar period, he resumed his legal career. He died suddenly in 1960, aged 44.

== Early life ==
Born in Roslyn, a suburb of Dunedin, in New Zealand, on 7 October 1915, Kenneth Stewart was the son of Mr W. Stewart and his wife. Stewart studied law after completing his schooling, qualified as a solicitor and duly entered the legal profession. Being of a short, stout stature, he was nicknamed 'Chunky'.

== Second World War ==
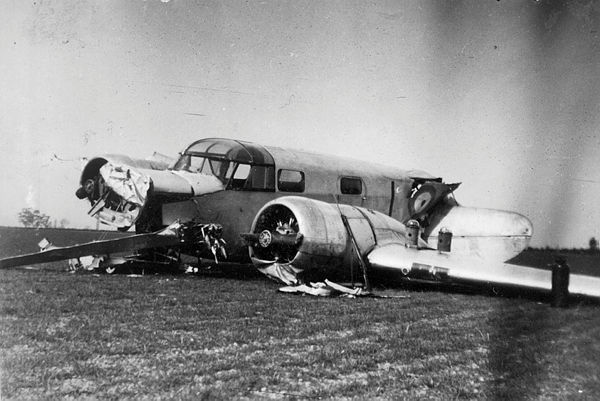
The Airspeed Oxford that Stewart crashed on 21 September 1941 while undergoing flight training at Wigram

In May 1941, Stewart joined the Royal New Zealand Air Force (RNZAF) with the service number 413145. He received his initial flight training at No. 1 Service Flying Training School (SFTS) at the RNZAF station at Wigram Aerodrome in Christchurch. Here he flew North American Harvards and Airspeed Oxfords, crashing an example of the latter aircraft on 21 September. He proceeded to the United Kingdom for further flight training with the Royal Air Force, arriving at No. 6 SFTS at Little Rissington in Gloucestershire in January 1942. After completing this phase of training, he was selected for an instructor's course following which he was posted to No. 29 Elementary Flying Training School at Clyffe Pypard in Wiltshire. Here he taught pupils to operate the de Havilland Tiger Moth trainer aircraft. After 12 months of instructing duties, he was transferred to No. 3 (Pilots) Advanced Flying Unit (AFU), based at South Cerney, this time operating Oxfords. A few months later he was shifted again, to a similar post at another AFU, at Shawbury.

In May 1944, Stewart was selected for night fighter training and posted to No. 54 Operational Training Unit to become familiar with the twin-engined Bristol Beaufighter and de Havilland Mosquito, both used as night fighters. From there, he and the radar operator he had been paired up with, Harold Brumby who, like Stewart, was a flying officer and a New Zealander, were posted to No. 488 Squadron.

=== Service with No. 488 Squadron ===
At the time Stewart and Brumby joined No. 488 Squadron, it was part of the Second Tactical Air Force. Based at Colerne in south England, the squadron was in the process of converting to the Mosquito Mk XXX, having previously operated the older Mk XIII version of the aircraft. Later in the month, the squadron shifted to Hunsdon. It was tasked with patrolling duties and also sought out launching sites for V-1 flying bombs but for several weeks it was relatively quiet. In mid-November the squadron shifted to France, operating from Amiens-Glisy. Bad weather and limited German activity meant that the aircrew continued to see little action.

The Luftwaffe increased its aerial operations once the Ardennes Offensive commenced in December. On 23 December, Stewart and Brumby were on their fifth operational sortie, patrolling around Roermond when a Junkers Ju 88 night fighter was detected on radar some 4 miles (6.4 km) distant. After closing in and verifying that the detected aircraft was German, Stewart opened fire and set one of the engines alight. The Ju 88 spun into the ground near Maeseyck and exploded. On gaining height after the successful interception, a second Ju 88 was detected. Stewart engaged this aircraft, setting it on fire and observing it subsequently crashing into the ground. It was not the only success for the squadron that night; two other German aircraft were destroyed by other aircrews.

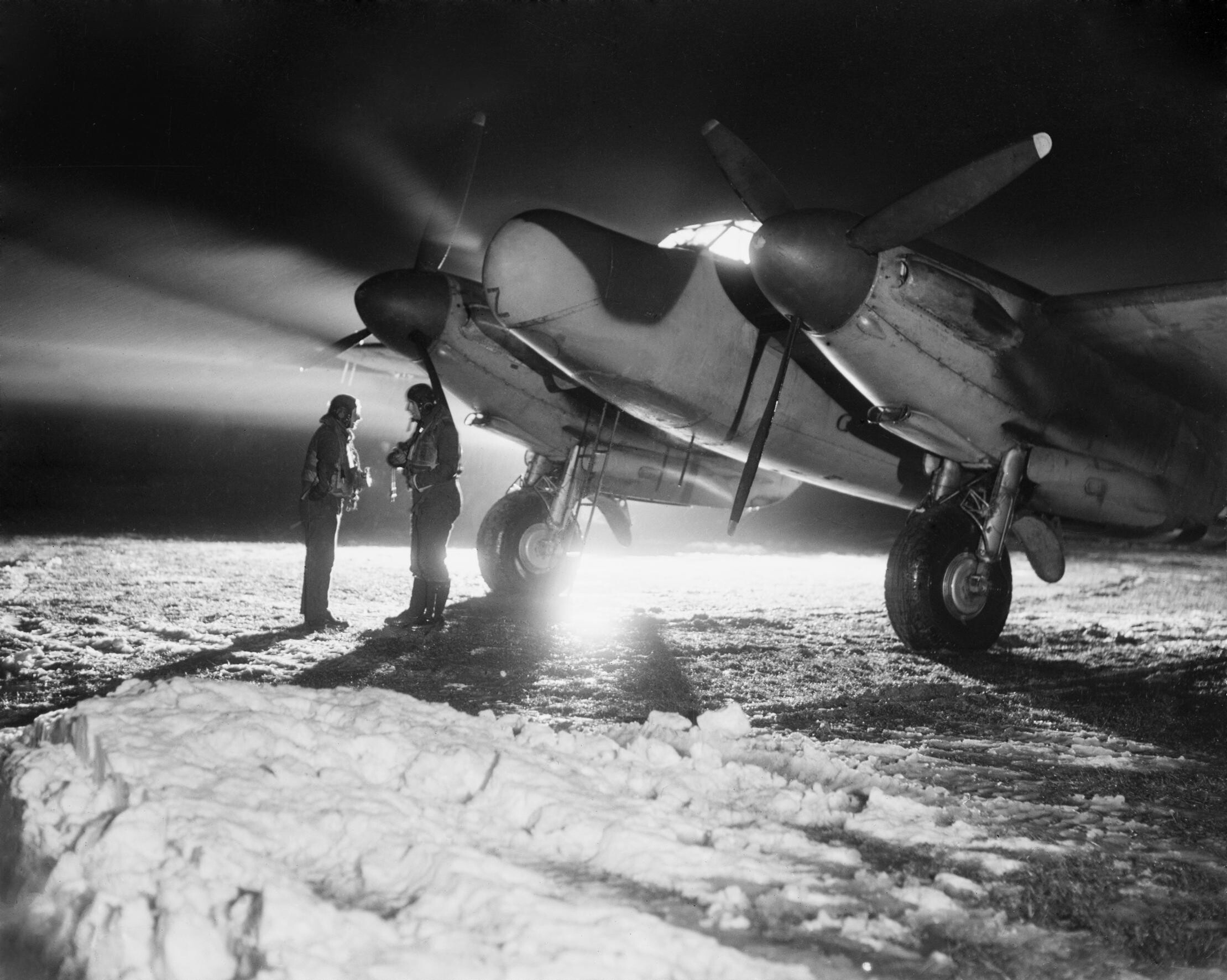
A de Havilland Mosquito night nighter

Patrolling again four days later, Stewart and Brumby sighted two Junkers Ju 87 dive bombers. Attempting to intercept them, their Mosquito was damaged by anti-aircraft fire. This led them to having to make a forced landing at Melsbroek, during which their aircraft overturned. Fortunately, neither man was hurt. Stewart had to make another emergency landing on 1 January 1945; that day the Luftwaffe mounted Operation Bodenplatte, an attack on a number of Allied airfields. Stewart and Brumby were flying when they spotted and pursued a fighter-bomber to Rheine but their Mosquito was damaged by anti-aircraft fire. They had to land at Brussels, just as German fighter-bombers attacked the airfield there. Their Mosquito avoided any further damage.

Aerial activity by the Luftwaffe then quietened down for the first several weeks of 1945 and poor weather also affected operations. On 21 February Stewart and Brumby were patrolling over Groenlo, in Holland, when ground radar detected an unidentified aircraft that was following them. Alerted to its presence, Stewart was able to manoeuvre behind the aircraft and identified it as a Ju 88. He engaged and destroyed the German aircraft, killing its pilot and wounding two aircrew.

On 26 March, while patrolling over the Ruhr, Stewart and Brumby destroyed a Messerschmitt Bf 110 heavy fighter, having tracked it on radar for some time before closing in to a sufficient distance to allow positive identification. The Bf 110 crashed near Bocholt. The duo resumed their patrol and soon picked up another aircraft on Brumby's radar, which was subsequently identified as a Heinkel He 111 medium bomber. Despite deteriorating weather, this too was engaged by Stewart and damaged. They had to abandon pursuit of the He 111 and, unable to return to their base in Amiens-Glisy because of poor visibility, flew across to England to land at Bradwell Bay.

In early April, No. 488 Squadron moved to Gilze-Rijen airfield in Holland; this allowed them to fly greater distances into Germany on their patrols. They were also tasked with providing aerial cover for Antwerp, a logistically important port for supplying the advancing Allied ground forces. On 7 April, Stewart and Brumby were alerted by ground radar to the presence of a German aircraft in their sector over the Ruhr. This transpired to be a Bf 110 which Stewart engaged and destroyed, his and Brumby's final aerial victory. They were the last pilots of No. 488 Squadron to achieve flying ace status during the war.

No. 488 Squadron was disbanded on 26 April. In June, both Stewart, by this time holding the rank of flight lieutenant, and Brumby were awarded the Distinguished Flying Cross for "gallantry and devotion to duty in the execution of air operations. They were officially credited with having destroyed five German aircraft and damaging another.

== Later life ==
On returning to New Zealand in September and being discharged from the RNZAF, Stewart immediately resumed his prewar profession as a lawyer, becoming a partner in a Dunedin law firm. He was also involved in veterans' affairs, serving on the executive committee of the Dunedin branch of the Returned Services Association. He died suddenly at his home in Dunedin on 3 August 1960.
