= Richard Haine =

RAF pilot and officer

- Born: 1 October 1916; Gloucester, England
- Died: 30 September 2008 (aged 91)
- Spouse: Evelyn Benton (m. 1948)
- Military career
- Allegiance: United Kingdom
- Branch: Royal Air Force
- Service years: 1936–1970
- Rank: Group Captain
- Commands: RAF Akrotiri (1964–66); RAF Turnhouse (1956–59); No. 488 Squadron RNZAF (1944); No. 96 Squadron RAF (1941–42)
- Conflicts: Second World War: Battle of Britain; Operation Overlord
- Awards: Officer of the Order of the British Empire; Distinguished Flying Cross; Mentioned in Despatches

Group Captain Richard Cummins Haine, OBE, DFC (1 October 1916 – 30 September 2008) was a British pilot and a Royal Air Force officer from 1936 to 1970. He received the Distinguished Flying Cross for his actions during the Second World War, including the first night fighter defence over Britain, and was involved in the first fighter attack of the war on German territory. Haine served as the commanding officer of No. 488 Squadron RNZAF in 1944.

== Early life ==
Haine was born in Gloucester on 1 October 1916 and matriculated from the Crypt Grammar School. While at school, he got his first taste of flight in an Avro 504 biplane trainer of Cobham's Flying Circus, which made him determined to fly. He spent his youth making aeroplane models and obsessing about flying. When he left school, he became an apprentice at the Gloster Aircraft Company and joined a local flying club, soloing in a Tiger Moth in 1935.

== Military service ==
Haine joined the Royal Air Force (RAF) in 1936 and qualified as a fighter pilot. He joined No. 25 Squadron RAF, flying the Hawker Fury. His prior experience led him to join the squadron aerobatics team in 1937. The squadron converted to the Hawker Demon, then the Gloster Gladiator and, when the Second World War started, the Bristol Blenheim.

Haine flew in the first night patrol of the RAF in the war, in a Blenheim from RAF Northolt on 4 September 1939. These night flights rarely intercepted any aircraft, primarily due to the absence of onboard radar.

On 28 November 1939, Haine flew one of six Blenheims of No. 25 Squadron to attack a seaplane base at Borkum, the first fighter attack of the war on German territory. He may have destroyed a Heinkel He 59 on the water.

On 10 May 1940, Haine led six Blenheims of No. 600 Squadron RAF against a key airfield at Waalhaven against an incipient landing by German Junkers Ju 52 transport aircraft and parachute troops. The raid was a disaster; five of the six aircraft were shot down upon arrival. Only one Blenheim returned safely to base. Haine and his gunner destroyed a Messerschmitt Bf 109 in the air and two Ju 52s on the ground before being shot down. They evaded capture and returned to England aboard HMS Hereward, the same Royal Navy destroyer that was evacuating the government of Norway and Queen Wilhelmina. Haine was awarded the Distinguished Flying Cross for the action. The award was published in The London Gazette on 9 July 1940. His medals were sold at auction for £7,000 in 2018.

Haine was deployed repeatedly to command positions. (Note: "On 31 December he took command of 96 squadron at Wrexham. When the command was upgraded to Wing Commander rank, Haine reverted to Flight Commander. He was posted to HQ Fighter Command on 24 March 1943 as Squadron Leader Night Training and then went as Wing Commander OC Training Wing at 54 OTU, Charterhall on 12 June 1943. In January 1944 Haine was given command of 488 (RNZAF) ... He moved to HQ 85 Group, and on 23 October 1944 and on 29 December to command of 147 Wing at Oldham. Haine was made OC at Winfield on 19 March 1945, a satellite station of 5402 U. He was briefly station commander at RAF Eshott. In May, at SOA at 302 Wing, Ibsley in June and held several appointments in Hong Kong from early September 1945 to the end of the war. He became wing commander of flying at RAF Kai Tak on 21 January 1946.") He served as the commanding officer of No. 488 Squadron RNZAF, flying the de Havilland Mosquito, until the end of November 1944.

While in command of No. 488 Squadron Haine and his squadron flew beachhead patrols on D-Day. Over Normandy on the night of 4 August he destroyed a Junkers Ju 88. On a patrol of Caen, during the night of 1 September, the squadron intercepted and shot down another. However, his claim for having made two kills while flying the Mosquito was reduced when the second Ju 88 was not credited to him.

Haine commanded RAF Turnhouse (now Edinburgh Airport) and then RAF Akrotiri, a large facility in Cyprus, for which he was appointed an Officer of the Order of the British Empire in the 1962 New Year Honours.

At the Ministry of Aviation, Haine was a staff officer, responsible for supervising flight testing of new aircraft. He trained at the Empire Test Pilots' School, and flew the McDonnell Douglas F-4 Phantom II in the United States. Eventually he earned qualifications to fly 94 types of aircraft, and flew 18 others as a second pilot.

In 1965, Haine was a participant in the funeral for Winston Churchill.

== Personal life ==
Haine was married twice; he had a daughter from his first marriage, which ended in divorce. He married Evelyn Benton in 1948. They had two sons and a daughter.

After retirement from the RAF, Haine worked for a short time as a service liaison officer for an insurance company. He thereafter devoted himself to sailing, a preferred avocation, and work as harbourmaster of a large Leamington marina.

Haine wrote an autobiography, From Fury to Phantom: An RAF Pilot's Story – 1936–1970, published in 2005. He died on 30 September 2008, the day before his 92nd birthday.
