= John Noble MacKenzie =

New Zealand flying ace (1914–1993)

John MacKenzie
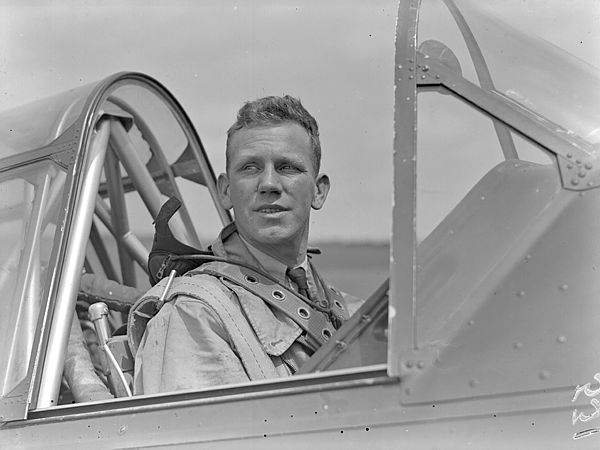
- MacKenzie in the cockpit of a North American Harvard trainer aircraft, 1943
- Born: 11 August 1914; Goodwood, Otago, New Zealand
- Died: 28 March 1993 (aged 78); Balclutha, New Zealand
- Military career
- Allegiance: New Zealand
- Branch: Royal Air Force (1937–1944); (1946–1957); Royal New Zealand Air Force (1944–1945)
- Rank: Squadron leader
- Commands: No. 64 Squadron; No. 14 Squadron
- Conflicts: Second World War; Operation Dynamo; Battle of Britain; Malayan campaign
- Awards: Distinguished Flying Cross

John Noble MacKenzie, DFC (11 August 1914 – 28 March 1993) was a New Zealand flying ace of the Royal Air Force (RAF) during the Second World War. He was officially credited with the destruction of nine enemy aircraft.

Born in Otago in New Zealand, MacKenzie joined the RAF in 1937 on a short service commission. After completing his flight training, he was posted to No. 41 Squadron where he flew Hawker Furys and then Supermarine Spitfires. He flew several patrols covering the beaches at Dunkirk during Operation Dynamo and then fought in the Battle of Britain, during which he destroyed several German aircraft. He was later sent to Singapore to join No. 488 Squadron, raised to strengthen the aerial defences of British Malaya. The squadron flew extensively during the Japanese invasion of British Malaya but was eventually evacuated to Australia. Mackenzie then commanded No. 14 Squadron before returning to the United Kingdom in mid-1943. He transferred to the Royal New Zealand Air Force in 1944, briefly commanded No. 64 Squadron, and finished the war in New Zealand. He later rejoined the RAF, serving in a number of training posts until his retirement from the military in 1957 with the rank of squadron leader. Returning to New Zealand, he ran an automotive dealership in Balclutha in his later years. He died in 1993.

== Early life ==
John Noble MacKenzie was born on 11 August 1914 in Goodwood, in Otago, New Zealand. His grandfather was Thomas MacKenzie, a former prime minister of New Zealand. He was educated at Timaru Boys' High School before going on to Otago Boys' High School. After completing his schooling he went farming but in April 1937 sought a short service commission in the Royal Air Force (RAF). His application was accepted, and he left for the United Kingdom in October 1937.

Training commenced at the Elementary Flying Training School at the RAF's station at Desford before going onto Uxbridge as an acting pilot officer. Further flight training followed at No. 9 Flying Training School at Hullavington and he earned his pilot's wings in June 1938. After advanced training was completed, in September 1939 he was posted to No. 41 Squadron. This was based at Catterick and operated Hawker Fury fighters. In January the following year, it began to re-equip with the Supermarine Spitfire fighter.

== Second World War ==
When the Second World War broke out, MacKenzie's squadron had yet to finish converting to the Spitfire. For the early part of the war, it carried out covering operations for convoys and patrols along the East coast of England. In late May 1940, it began operating from Hornchurch, flying patrols over the beaches at Dunkirk during Operation Dynamo for a two-week period. During this time, MacKenzie flew several patrols but only ever sighted one enemy aircraft. At the end of its period of service at Hornchurch, the squadron went back to Catterick for a rest.

=== Battle of Britain ===
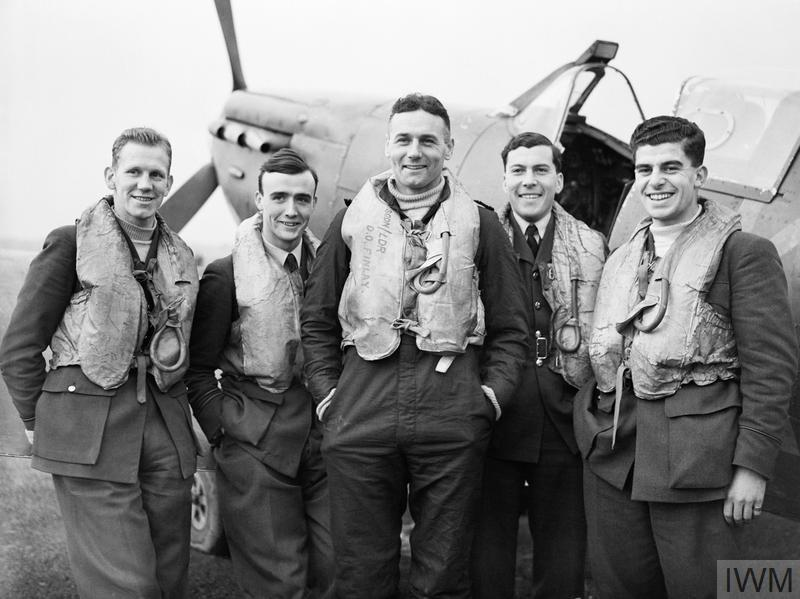
Pilots of No. 41 Squadron, December 1940. MacKenzie stands on the far left and in the centre is Squadron Leader Don Finlay, a former Olympic hurdler for Great Britain

In late July, No. 41 Squadron returned to Hornchurch to assist No. 11 Group, now heavily engaged in the Battle of Britain. MacKenzie's first encounter with the Luftwaffe during the battle was on the morning of 29 July when his section encountered a formation of bombers escorted by fighters. He engaged one fighter but was attacked by another which damaged his Spitfire. With a smoke-filled cockpit and unable to bale out, he made a forced landing at Deal. In a later flight that day, he engaged a Dornier Do 17 medium bomber but return fire from its rear gunner damaged his aircraft and he made another forced landing. The squadron operated from Hornchurch until mid-August before it returned to Catterick.

On 15 August, when the Luftwaffe mounted large scale daylight bombing raids against the United Kingdom, MacKenzie was leading a section of No. 41 Squadron when it encountered a large group of Junkers Ju 88 medium bombers near the Durham coast. Mackenzie claimed a Ju 88 as probably destroyed, seeing smoke coming from the starboard engine after his attack but being unable to verify it as definitely destroyed. In early September, and with MacKenzie having just been promoted to flying officer, the squadron went back to Hornchurch. He shot down a Messerschmitt Bf 109 fighter over Canterbury on 6 September, having pursued it from 16,000 feet (4,900 m) above the Thames Estuary. He claimed another Bf 109 the same day as a probable. On 9 September, he shot down a Bf 109 and two days later claimed a Heinkel He 111 medium bomber; its crew made a forced landing in a field after MacKenzie shot up its port engine. Although he received sole credit for the He 111, MacKenzie believed that it had already been damaged in an earlier encounter with RAF fighters. He shared in the destruction of another bomber, a Do 17, on 15 September. A week later, while he and a colleague escorted an Avro Anson near Calais, they encountered a group of Bf 109s. MacKenzie shot down one, which crashed into the English Channel, and damaged another. He shot down a Bf 109 on 5 October and shared in the shooting down of a Dornier Do 215 medium bomber two days later. Two more Bf 109s were damaged while on a patrol on 25 October. He ended the patrol running out of fuel and damaging his Spitfire when landing in a field near Redhill. At the end of the month he destroyed a Bf 109 over Marden.

Although the Battle of Britain was now officially over, No. 41 Squadron continued to encounter enemy aircraft in its area of operations as the Luftwaffe resumed attacking convoys in the English Channel and Thames Estuary. MacKenzie destroyed a Bf 109 on 17 November 1940, tacking onto the end of a formation of three enemy fighters without them realising his presence until he opened fire. On 27 November his squadron encountered a group of ten Bf 109s, all of which were destroyed with MacKenzie accounting for one which crashed near Folkestone. This was to be his last confirmed victory. The same month, he was awarded the Distinguished Flying Cross (DFC); the citation published in the London Gazette read:

Flying Officer MacKenzie has flown with his squadron since the war began and has on numerous occasions led his squadron. He took part in the intensive air fighting covering the Dunkirk operations, and has since led his section with conspicuous success. Since 6th September, 1940, this officer has destroyed at least seven enemy aircraft and has at all times shown skill, courage and determination in pressing home his attacks against superior numbers of the enemy.

— London Gazette, No. 34993, 15 November 1940

Promoted to acting flight lieutenant in January 1941, MacKenzie was now commanding one of the squadron's flights. The DFC he had been awarded the previous November was presented to him by King George VI in a ceremony at Buckingham Palace in late February. Soon afterwards, having made a total of 245 operational flights, MacKenzie was taken off operations and began flight control duties. His acting rank was made permanent later in the year.

=== Singapore ===
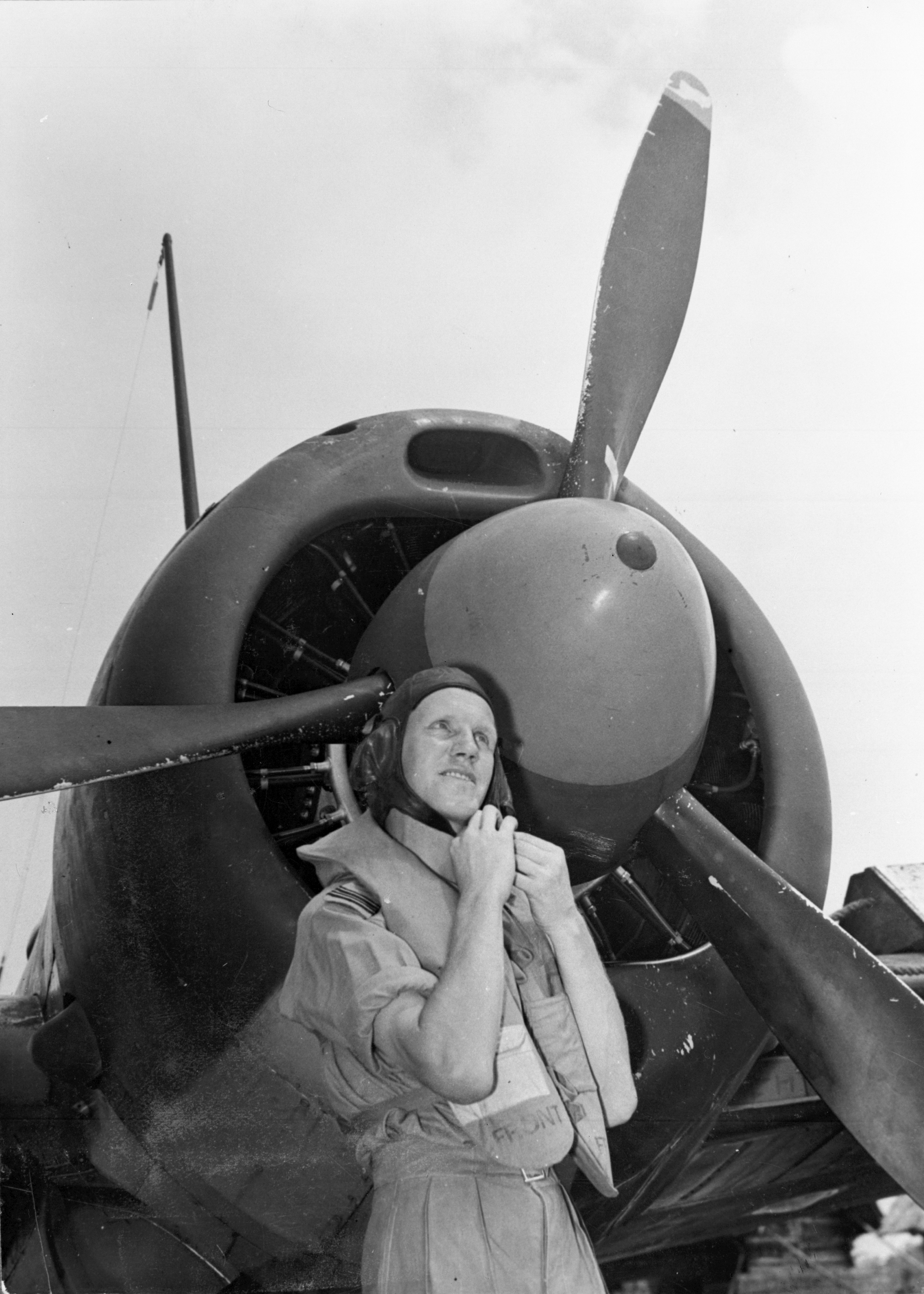
MacKenzie stands in front of a Brewster Buffalo adjusting his flying helmet

In September 1941, MacKenzie was posted to join the newly formed No. 488 Squadron, raised by the Royal New Zealand Air Force (RNZAF) in New Zealand and intended for service in Singapore. The squadron needed experienced leaders like MacKenzie to help bring it up to operational readiness as soon as possible. MacKenzie arrived in Singapore in October to join the squadron and take command of its "A" flight. The squadron was based at Kallang and began familiarisation with the Brewster Buffalo aircraft, which it had taken over from No. 67 Squadron. MacKenzie was heavily involved in the training of the squadron as its commander, Squadron Leader Wilfred Clouston, another Battle of Britain veteran, was occupied with the administrative duties.

When the Japanese attacked British Malaya in December 1941, the squadron had yet to reach operational standards and intensified its training. By the end of the year it was flying regular patrols aimed at detecting and destroying Japanese reconnaissance aircraft but the Buffaloes were inadequate for the task, having a low operational ceiling. In the squadron's first major encounter with the enemy, an interception of a bombing raid, McKenzie's Buffalo was damaged by a Ki-27.

Losses to Japanese fighters and bombing raids on Kallang soon reduced the squadron to only a few aircraft by the end of the month by which time MacKenzie was its commander. He had taken over the role when Clouston was posted to RAF Headquarters in Singapore. Despite reinforcement with some Hawker Hurricanes, the Japanese bombing of the squadron's airfield hampered operations. In fact, as a result of the bombing, he lost his hearing for a time. The squadron was shortly evacuated to Tjililitan airfield, in the Dutch East Indies, from where they flew covering patrols over Java until the Japanese advance prompted a further move to Fremantle in Australia on 23 February 1942.

=== Later war service ===
MacKenzie went on to New Zealand where in April he took command of the newly raised No. 14 Squadron, a unit of the RNZAF. He had been promoted to acting squadron leader the previous month. His new command was mostly made up of personnel who had served in Singapore and was equipped with P-40 Kittyhawk fighters after initially working up on North American Harvard trainer aircraft. After four months at No. 14 Squadron, MacKenzie was posted to the Fighter Operational Conversion Unit which was based at Ohakea. He remained there until mid-1943 at which time he returned to the United Kingdom. Once there, he went to RAF Sutton Bridge to complete a course at the Central Gunnery School. He then took command of the gunnery and bombing squadron at No. 61 Fighter Operational Training Unit.

In April 1944, MacKenzie was appointed commander of No. 64 Squadron, which operated Spitfires escorting bombings, attacking coastal shipping and flying patrols along the English coast. In September he was repatriated to New Zealand, having transferred to the RNZAF earlier in the year. He hoped to go on operations against the Japanese but in the event this did not eventuate and instead, after doing a conversion course on the F4U Corsair fighter, he went back to Ohakea, but this time to the Fighter Leaders School. He remained there until August 1945 when he left the RNZAF. He was officially credited with the destruction of nine enemy aircraft, a share in another destroyed aircraft, three probably destroyed, and three damaged.

== Later life ==
Returning to the United Kingdom in 1946, MacKenzie sought a return to the RAF. He was successful and resumed his service career that July as the commander of Air Fighting Development Squadron at RAF West Raynham. His commission was made permanent with the rank of squadron leader in September 1948. He was posted to Home Command at the Air Ministry where he served for two years. For medical reasons, he was unable to hold a flying post from July 1950. He served on the staff of the School of Land/Air Warfare at Old Sarum before taking up a post in Hong Kong. He then moved onto the headquarters of the Far East Air Force, based in Singapore. His final posting was back in the United Kingdom, at RAF Brampton, where he was on the research staff at the Technical Training Command for 18 months. He resigned from the RAF in October 1957.

Returning to New Zealand, MacKenzie purchased an automotive dealership in Balcultha and operated this until 1972, at which time he retired. He died at Balcultha on 28 March 1993, survived by his wife and two children. A son had predeceased him.
