= Wilfred Clouston =

New Zealand Second World War flying ace

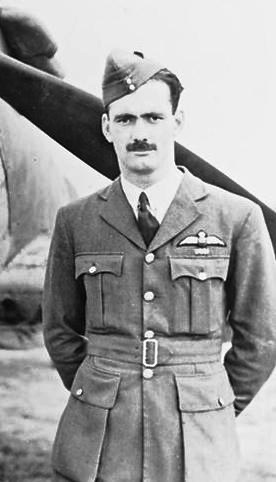
- Wilfred Clouston, September 1940
- Born: 15 January 1916; Auckland, New Zealand
- Died: 24 May 1980 (aged 64); Waipukurau, New Zealand
- Military career
- Allegiance: New Zealand
- Branch: Royal Air Force
- Service years: 1936–1957
- Rank: Acting Group Captain
- Nickname: Wilf
- Commands: No. 258 Squadron; No. 488 (NZ) Squadron; RAF Northolt
- Conflicts: Second World War
- Awards: Distinguished Flying Cross

Wilfred Greville Clouston DFC (15 January 1916 – 24 May 1980) was a New Zealand flying ace of the Royal Air Force (RAF) during the Second World War. He was credited with the destruction of nine enemy aircraft and shared in the destruction of three more.

Born in Auckland, New Zealand, Clouston joined the RAF in 1936. He flew Supermarine Spitfires with No. 19 Squadron during the Battle of France and the subsequent Battle of Britain. He later commanded No. 258 Squadron. In August 1941 he was sent to Singapore to take command of No. 488 (NZ) Squadron but became a prisoner of war when the British surrendered Singapore in February 1942. He remained in the RAF after the war, holding a series of administrative posts until his retirement in 1957. He farmed in New Zealand until his death in 1980 at the age of 64.

== Early life ==
Wilfred Greville Clouston, known as Wilf, was born in Auckland, New Zealand, on 15 January 1916, the son of Allan and Vivienne Clouston. He had a younger brother named John. The family later moved to Wellington, where Clouston was educated except for his final year of schooling, which was at Nelson College. On completing his education, he worked as a clerk. Interested in flying, he took piloting lessons at Rongotai Aerodrome and in 1935 earned his pilot's licence. The following year he travelled to England where he obtained a short service commission in the Royal Air Force (RAF).

After a period of basic training at Uxbridge, Clouston proceeded to the No. 7 Flying Training School at the RAF's station at Peterborough. After gaining his wings, he was posted to No. 19 Squadron as an acting pilot officer in June 1937. At the time, the squadron was based at Duxford and operated the Gloster Gauntlet but in August the following year, it began to re-equip with the Supermarine Spitfire. It was the first squadron in the RAF to do so. While becoming familiar with the aircraft, Clouston had a mid-air collision with another Spitfire; both managed to safely land.

== Second World War ==
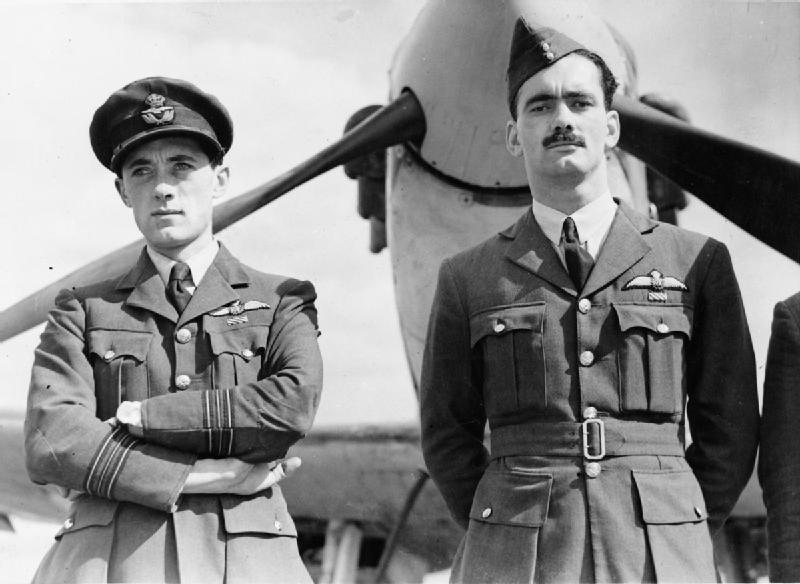
Clouston, on the right, stands alongside Squadron Leader Brian Lane, who led No. 19 Squadron during the Battle of Britain

After the outbreak of the Second World War, No. 19 Squadron was still stationed at Duxford. Its operational role was to protect shipping in the North Sea by flying covering missions for convoys but generally it saw little offensive action by the Germans. In early May 1940, Clouston and his section pursued a Junkers Ju 88 bomber off the coast of East Anglia but failed to down it. By this time, Clouston was married to Anne née Hyde, the ceremony having taken place at Little Wilbraham. His wife was the daughter of an admiral of the Royal Navy.

Soon after the German invasion of the Low Countries, No. 19 Squadron began operations over the French and Belgian coast, flying from airfields in the south of England. The intensity of operations increased towards the end of the month as the bulk of the British Expeditionary Force (BEF) withdrew to the area around Dunkirk and the RAF fighter squadrons provided aerial cover for the trapped troops. Clouston, now a flight lieutenant, was leading a flight of his squadron on its first patrol over Dunkirk on 26 May 1940 when it encountered around 20 Junkers Ju 87 dive bombers along with their fighter escorts. Clouston destroyed two of the Ju 87s. The next day, he shot down a Dornier Do 17 and with two other pilots in his flight probably destroyed another. On 1 June, again over Dunkirk, he shared in the destruction of a Messerschmitt Bf 110 and on his own, shot down a Messerschmitt Bf 109. The RAF's protective efforts over Dunkirk ceased after the evacuation of the BEF was completed on 4 June. Later in the month, he was awarded the Distinguished Flying Cross (DFC) for his efforts; the citation published in The London Gazette read:

During recent operations over France and Belgium, Flight Lieutenant Clouston shot down four enemy aircraft. He has led his flight with determination and vigour, and has shown great personal gallantry.

— London Gazette, No. 34881, 25 June 1940

=== Battle of Britain ===
No. 19 Squadron returned to Duxford but was then shifted to nearby Fowlmere, as part of No. 12 Group which provided fighter cover for the Midlands. In June the squadron took delivery of some Spitfires that were experimentally fitted with Hispano cannons but these proved problematic and were prone to jamming. As the Battle of Britain escalated, the squadron was one of those that formed the Duxford Wing and were scrambled on several occasions in August to protect the airfields of No. 11 Group. On 9 August, while flying a cannon-equipped Spitfire, Clouston was credited with half shares in two Bf 109s shot down over the Thames Estuary. Despite his success with the cannons, the squadron reverted to Spitfires equipped with the standard Browning machine guns in early September; too many instances of jammed cannons had compromised its efforts in destroying enemy aircraft.

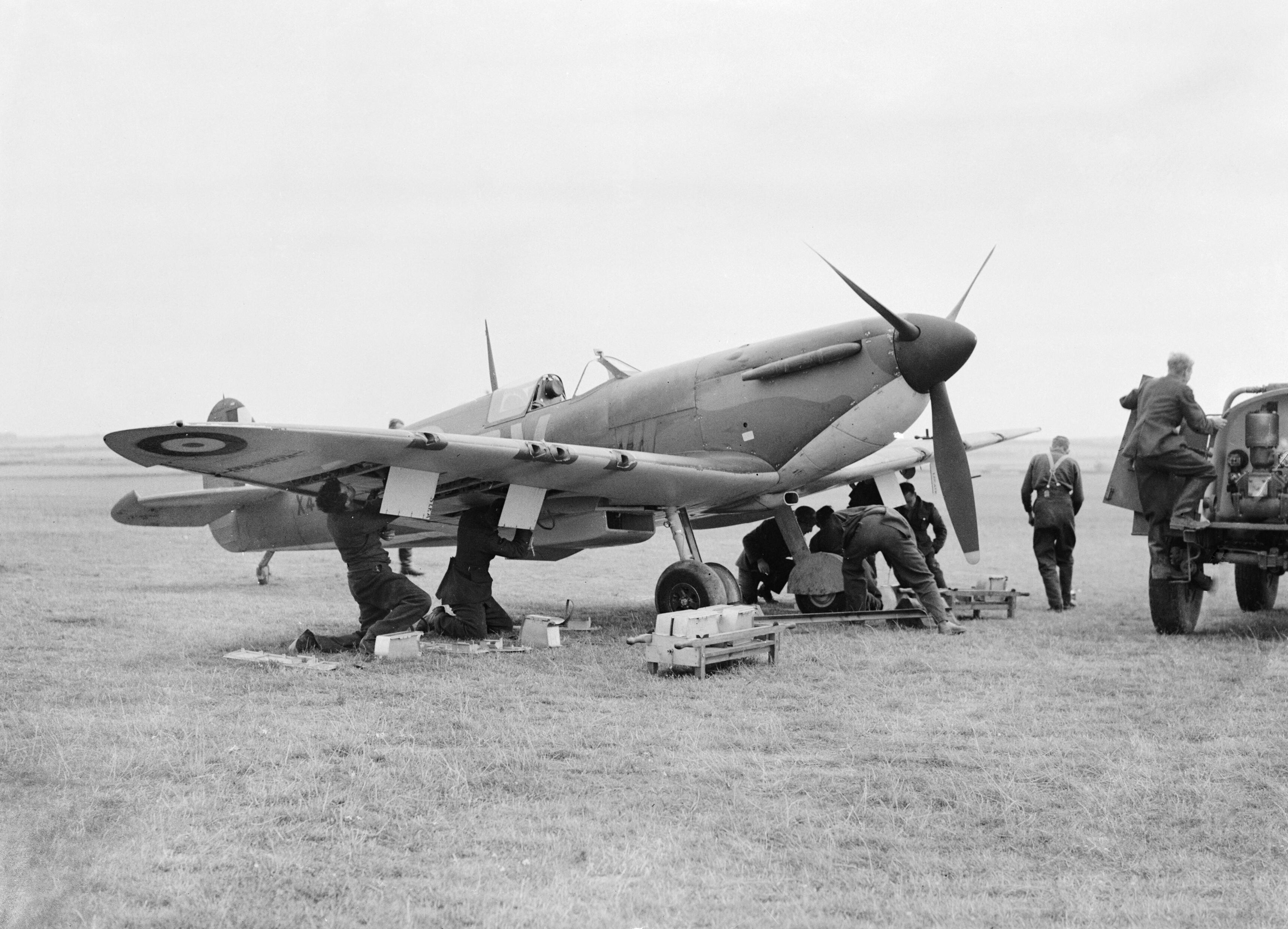
A Spitfire of No. 19 Squadron being re-armed at Fowlmere, September 1940

Clouston destroyed one Bf 109 and claimed another as probable while on patrol with the squadron on 9 September. On Battle of Britain Day, 15 September 1940, No. 12 Group was scrambled to support No. 11 Group in its effort to deal with a large bombing raid mounted by the Luftwaffe. With plenty of notice, the Duxford Wing of five squadrons was scrambled and assembled over London as the bombers approached. When the British fighters attacked, the bombers scattered and Clouston, leading a section of his flight, spotted a group of Do 17s and managed to destroy one. Later the same day, during another bombing raid mounted by the Germans, he shot down a second Do 17. A few days later, he destroyed a Ju 88 over the Thames Estuary.

In November 1940, Clouston, promoted to squadron leader, was appointed commander of No. 258 Squadron, which was based in Yorkshire. The majority of the flying personnel of this newly formed squadron, which operated Hawker Hurricanes, were New Zealanders. It began its operational service flying cover for convoys along the north-east coast but soon shifted to Jurby, in the Isle of Man. From Jurby it flew patrols to target German bombers attacking the ports along the English north east coast. In May 1941, the squadron was shifted to the south east of England and began to fly missions escorting bombers to targets in France.

On one of these operations, accompanying Bristol Blenheims raiding a petroleum plant in Gosnay, Clouston was wounded when his Hurricane was attacked by a Bf 109. He was still able to fly back to Kenley, where the squadron was based at the time. At one stage, Clouston was joined at the squadron by his brother John, who had joined the Royal New Zealand Air Force (RNZAF) in 1940 and had been sent to England to fly with the RAF. John was killed in July 1944 when, having been shot down over France on D-Day and made a prisoner of war, his prison transport was strafed by American fighters.

By August 1941, the British Government had recognised the growing threat that the Japanese Empire presented to its territories in Asia and the New Zealand Government was requested to assist in improving British Malaya's air defences. Accordingly, the RNZAF dispatched personnel to form a new fighter squadron in Singapore. As an experienced squadron commander, Clouston was ordered to take command of the squadron, to be designated No. 488 (NZ) Squadron. His wife went to New Zealand to live with his parents in Wellington.

=== Singapore ===
Clouston arrived in Singapore on 19 September 1941 as the first member of No. 488 Squadron. His flight commanders were in Singapore ten days later and together they greeted the rest of the squadron when it arrived from New Zealand on board the SS Tasman on 10 October. The squadron was based at Kallang and began familiarisation with the Brewster Buffalo aircraft, which it had taken over from No. 67 Squadron. The Buffalo was a poor aircraft and Clouston had concerns about its suitability as a fighter. Despite this, he set about bringing the squadron up to operational readiness as soon as possible but his time was largely taken up with administrative matters and his flight commanders did much of the flying training.

When the Japanese attacked British Malaya in December 1941, the squadron had yet to reach operational standards and intensified its training. By the end of the year it was flying regular patrols aimed at detecting and destroying Japanese reconnaissance aircraft but the Buffaloes were inadequate for the task, having a low operational ceiling. When the squadron began encountering Japanese fighters in mid-January 1942, the poor performance of the Buffaloes became even more apparent. Losses to Japanese fighters and bombing raids on Kallang soon reduced the squadron to only a few aircraft by the end of the month.

On 23 January 1942, Clouston was posted to RAF headquarters at Singapore, working in the operations room, with John MacKenzie, one of the squadron's flight commanders, taking over responsibility for No. 488 Squadron. During the final days of the Battle of Singapore, with the squadron's pilots having already been evacuated, its ground crew worked to prepare a Hawker Hurricane for Clouston's use in the event he wanted to escape. In the end, he took to a launch with other staff from RAF Air Operations but this was sunk in the Bangka Strait during an attack by a Japanese bomber. Rescued by a steamer that was intercepted by the Japanese the following day, he became a prisoner of war (POW). Before his capture, he was able to facilitate the evacuation of the remaining ground crew of the squadron from Singapore, obtaining spaces for them aboard the Empire Star when it sailed on 12 February.

Clouston was interned for most of the war at a POW camp at Palembang in Sumatra but by the time of the Japanese surrender in September 1945, he was held at Changi Prison back on Singapore. He was suffering from malnutrition at the time of his release.

== Later life ==
On his return to England, Clouston took a permanent commission in the RAF and was given an appointment as commander of RAF Turnhouse. Promoted to wing commander in July 1950, he went onto a variety of positions during his post-war RAF career, including on the air staff at Fighter Command and command of RAF Khormaksar in Aden. After attending a course at the Combined Staff College, his last post was as commander of RAF Northolt. Having reached the rank of acting group captain, he retired from the RAF in 1957 and went back to New Zealand.

He took up farming in Waipukurau, in the Hawke's Bay Region. The effects of his internment as a prisoner of war saw his health decline rapidly in his later years and his son took over the running of his farm, named Tangmere after the RAF station, while Clouston moved to town. He was hospitalised after a fall at his home and died on 24 May 1980. His uniform and medals, which in addition to the DFC also included the 1939–1945 Star with Battle of Britain clasp and the War Medal, were in the possession of the Waipukurau Returned and Services Association until its closure in December 2011.

Clouston is credited with destroying nine enemy aircraft, and shared in the destruction of three more. He also claimed one enemy aircraft as probably destroyed, and a share in another probable.
