= No. 258 Squadron RAF =

Defunct flying squadron of the Royal Air Force

- Squadron badge of No. 258 Squadron
- Active: 25 July 1918 – 5 March 1918; 20 November 1940 - October 1941; 1 March 1942 – 31 December 1945
- Country: United Kingdom
- Branch: Royal Air Force
- Mottos: 'In medias re' (In the middle of things)
- Engagements: Java, Ceylon

Commanders
- Notable commanders: Marshal of the RAF Sir Neil Cameron

Insignia
- Squadron Badge heraldry: In front of wings elevated and conjoined in base, a panthers face
- Squadron Codes: FH (Apr 1939 - Sep 1939); ZT (Aug 1944 - Dec 1945)

No. 258 Squadron was a Royal Air Force squadron during the First and Second World Wars.

== History ==
=== First World War ===
No. 258 Squadron was first formed 25 July 1918 from 523, 525 and 529 Special Duties Flights at Luce Bay near Stranraer, Scotland under the control of No. 25 Group RAF. It was equipped with De Havilland DH.6 biplanes and carried out anti-submarine patrols over the Irish Sea. It was disbanded on 5 March 1918.

=== World War II ===
The squadron was reformed on 20 November 1940 at RAF Leconfield, Yorkshire as a fighter squadron equipped with Hawker Hurricanes, commanded by Wilfred Clouston. First based at RAF Acklington, it was later relocated to RAF Jurby on the Isle of Man. By April 1941, No. 258 Squadron's time at Jurby had come to an end, and they transferred to RAF Valley and thence to RAF Kenley in preparation to take the offensive to the enemy. In October they were stood down to prepare for a move to the Far East. After a few days in Singapore, they were withdrawn to Sumatra and then Java, where they suffered many losses either killed or captured by the Japanese. The survivors transferred their aircraft to No. 605 Squadron and most attempted to escape by ship to Australia, but all the ships were sunk en route with no survivors.

The squadron was again reformed 1 March 1942 from G Squadron at Ratmalana Airport, near Colombo, Ceylon but suffered severe losses during the Japanese carrier strike on 5 April 1942. After a spell in Burma (under Neil Cameron) the squadron was withdrawn to be re-equipped with American Republic P-47 Thunderbolts. In June 1945 it then began training for the invasion of Malaya but on the Japanese surrender, the squadron was finally disbanded on 31 December 1945.

The squadron was largely manned by Royal New Zealand Air Force pilots.

== See also ==
- List of Royal Air Force aircraft squadrons

== Bibliography ==
- Halley, James J. (1988). The Squadrons of the Royal Air Force & Commonwealth, 1981-1988. Tonbridge, Kent, UK: Air-Britain (Historians). ISBN 0-85130-164-9.
