= No. 488 Squadron RNZAF =

No. 488 (NZ) Squadron RAF
- Active: 1 September 1941 – 26 April 1945
- Country: United Kingdom
- Allegiance: New Zealand
- Branch: Royal Air Force
- Role: Fighter squadron
- Mottos: Māori: Ka ngarue ratau (Translation: "We shake them")
- Anniversaries: 1 September 1941

Insignia
- Squadron Badge: In front of a taiaha and tewhatewha in saltire, a morepork
- Squadron Codes: NF (Oct 1941 – Jan 1942); ME (Jun 1942 – Apr 1945)

Aircraft flown
- Fighter: Brewster Buffalo; Hawker Hurricane; Bristol Beaufighter de Havilland Mosquito

No. 488 Squadron was the name given to two distinct Royal New Zealand Air Force squadrons during the Second World War. Both were formed under Article XV of the Empire Air Training Scheme and served under the operational command of the Royal Air Force.

== Background ==
In the mid-1930s, the Royal Air Force (RAF) was in the process of expanding and required an increasing number of suitable flying personnel. A number of schemes were implemented for New Zealanders to obtain short-service commissions in the RAF with the intention of then transferring to the Royal New Zealand Air Force (RNZAF) in the future. This led to over 500 New Zealanders serving in the RAF by the time of the outbreak of the Second World War.

At around the same time there was discussion between the governments of Britain, Australia, Canada and New Zealand to facilitate the co-ordination of training of air crew in the event of hostilities. This led to the implementation of the Empire Air Training Scheme (ETAS) in December 1939. Under this agreement, New Zealand committed to initially supply 880 full trained pilots for the RAF, with another 520 pilots being trained to an elementary standard annually. As each of the Dominion governments desired its personnel to serve together, the ETAS had a clause, Article XV, that allowed for the establishment of squadrons with personnel from the respective countries. In theory, the Dominions would supply the ground crew as well as flying personnel. However, in New Zealand's case, there was a reluctance to maintain RNZAF squadrons in Britain so the decision was made to allow for the formation of squadrons within the RAF designated as being New Zealand. These squadrons, known as Article XV squadrons, were formed around a cadre of New Zealand flying personnel already serving in the RAF but supplemented by newly trained pilots from the RNZAF.

== History ==
=== Day fighter unit ===
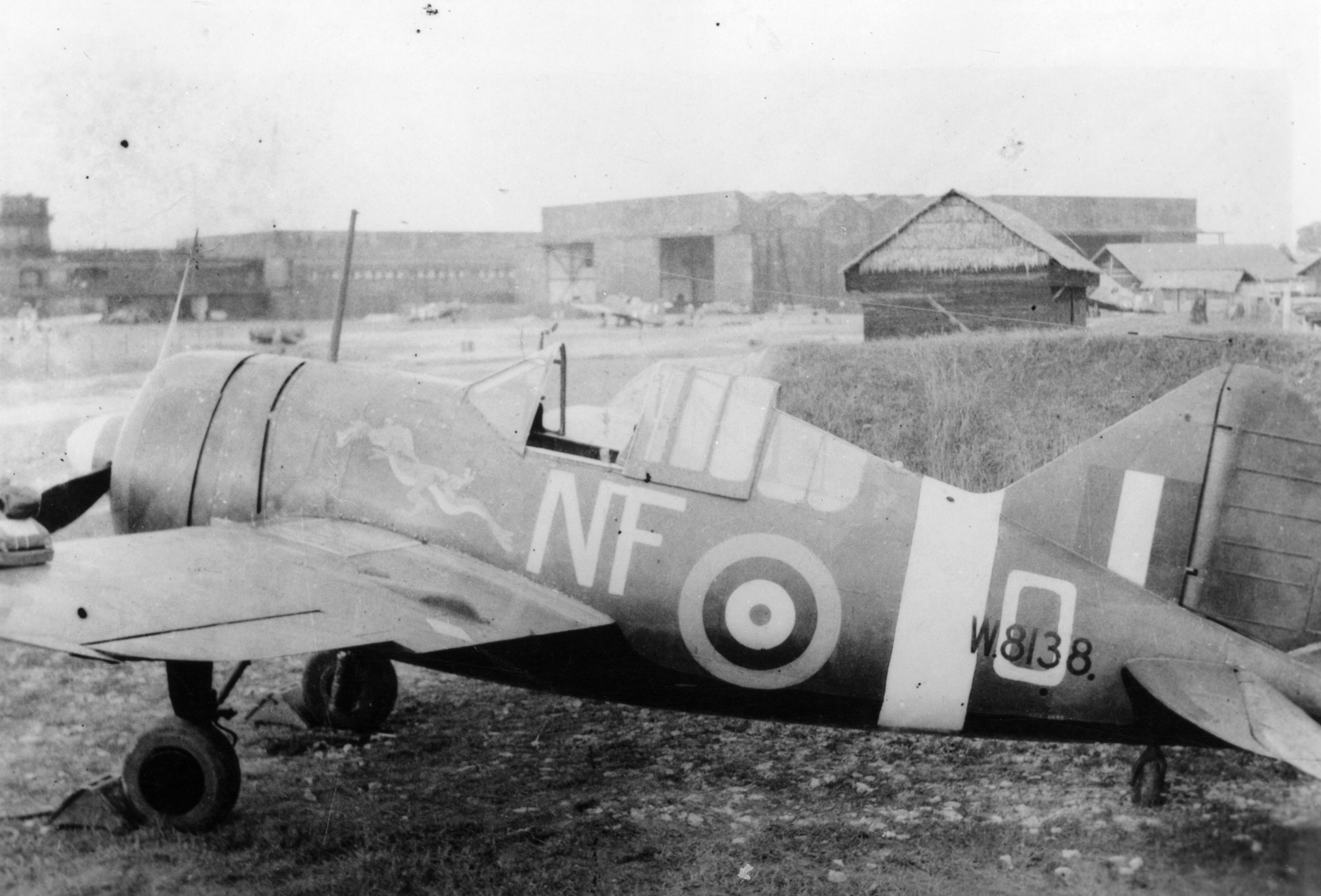
Noel Sharp's Brewster Buffalo at RAF Kallang, January 1942

No. 488 (NZ) Squadron was formed on 1 September 1941 at Rongotai, New Zealand under the command of Squadron Leader Wilfred Clouston, a veteran of the Battle of France and Battle of Britain with nine aerial victories to his credit. The squadron was one of several Commonwealth squadrons equipped with Brewster Buffalos, and arrived at Kallang Airfield Singapore in November, where it took over the Brewsters of No. 67 Squadron. Kallang was shared with a Brewster detachment of the 2-VLG-V of the Royal Netherlands East Indies Air Force, and No. 243 Squadron, in which most of the aircrew were New Zealanders.

When the Japanese attacked, the squadron was still in training and sorting out difficulties with its machines, including dysfunctional oxygen which prevented high-altitude flying, weight difficulties which resulted in armour and machine guns being deleted and high maintenance requirements resulting from Brewster's use of worn out ex-airline engines in manufacturing the aircraft (which had been supplied to No. 67 Squadron in March). There were also problems getting spares and with the peacetime red tape and restricted flying hours laid down by the British High Command in Singapore.

Frequent air battles over Singapore occurred from 12 January 1942, the Japanese pilots being better trained and outnumbering the defenders, but (despite widespread claims of Mitsubishi Zeros being present), with the exception of a few Nakajima Ki-43 Hayabusa "Oscars" most Japanese fighters and many bombers were in no better condition than those of the Royal Air Force's. As the Buffalo squadrons (many manned by New Zealanders and Australians) lost men and machines, several were amalgamated into 488 Squadron. Clouston had presented a plan "Get Mobile" to provide daylight air cover off the coast to Admiral Phillip's Force Z, but this was rejected by the Royal Navy.

The squadron received nine Hawker Hurricanes at the end of January to partially replace the Buffalos, but by 31 January, losses and the ground situation forced a withdrawal to Palembang, Sumatra and a few days later to Tjililitan airfield, near Batavia, Java, where Dutch East Indies Buffalo squadrons were facing a similarly unequal fight. Clouston handed over command to Squadron Leader John MacKenzie and stayed with remaining staff to become a prisoner when Singapore fell.

On 23 February, the squadron evacuated Tjililitan, to Fremantle in Australia where it disbanded on 2 March, the New Zealand pilots returning home to form the nucleus of No. 14 Squadron RNZAF. Figures for the squadron's achievements in the Far East are difficult to determine, but one notable pilot, Flying officer Noel Sharp, who flew a Brewster Buffalo in Singapore, is credited with three victories.

=== Night fighter unit ===
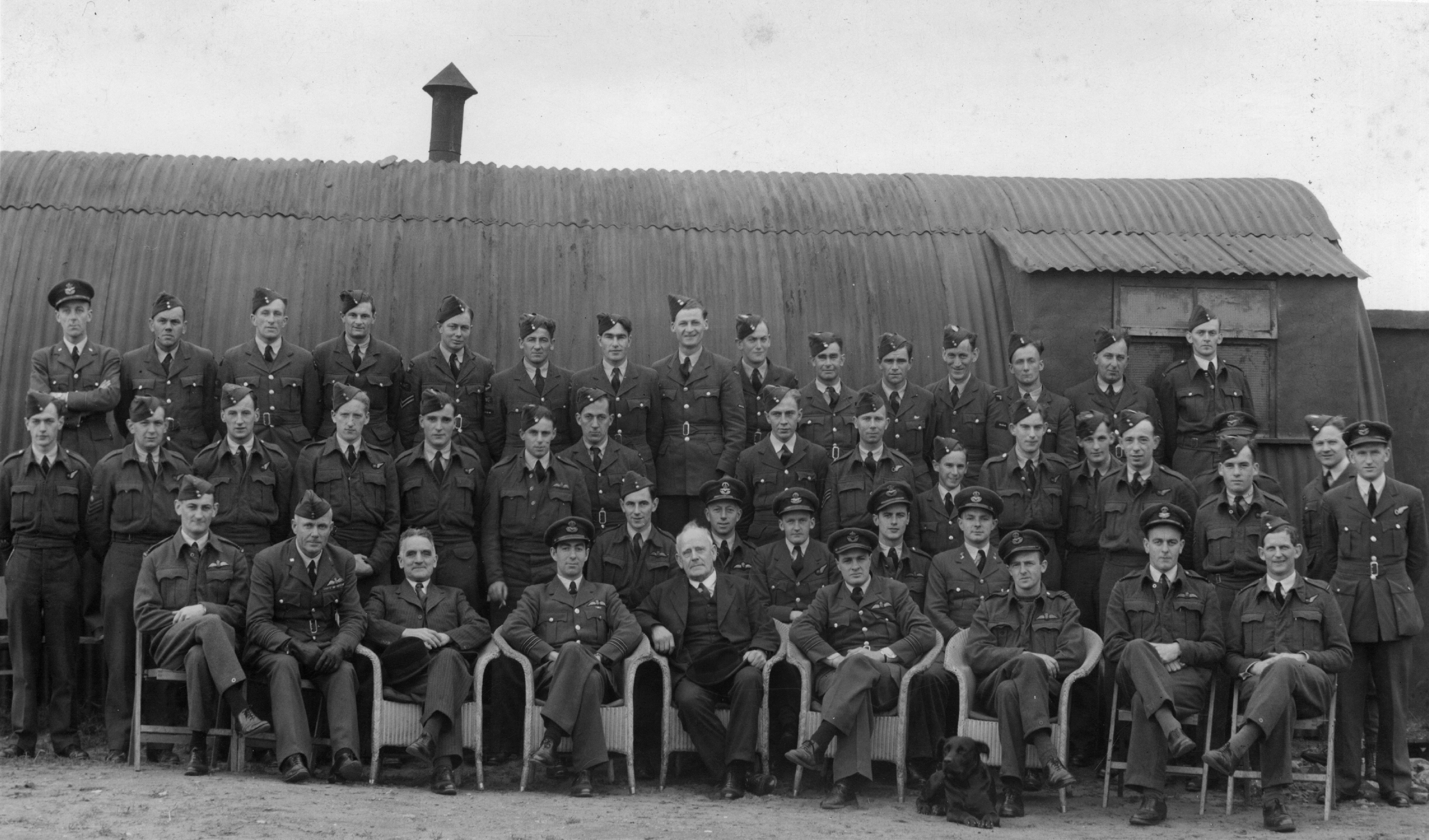
Personnel of No. 488 Squadron, with William Jordan (centre), the New Zealand High Commissioner to the UK, 27 September 1942

No. 488 Squadron was reformed on 25 June 1942 at Church Fenton, in Yorkshire, as a night fighter 'intruder' unit equipped with the twin-engined Bristol Beaufighter. The squadron aircraft carried the code letters ME. When it switched to a defensive role in August 1943 it was re-equipped with de Havilland Mosquitoes. Flight Lieutenant John Hall and his radar operator Jock Cairns combined to destroy two German bombers on the opening night of the Luftwaffe's Operation Steinbock, its renewed bombing campaign against England.

Following the invasion of Normandy the squadron began performing in an offensive role, operating from the permanent RAF station at Zeals, Wiltshire. It patrolled over the landing beaches, protecting the land forces from night attacks mounted by German bombers, and also carried out intruder missions, seeking out targets of opportunity such as transport vehicles and enemy aircraft. From early July, the squadron began operating from a temporary situation at Colerne, Wiltshire. The weather for most of the month was poor so there was little action until towards the end of July, at which time German air activity increased. In November the squadron moved to France, and was based in Belgium and Holland in the closing stages of the war. It disbanded on 26 April 1945.

Possibly the top scoring No. 488 Squadron Mosquito of the war was NF.Mk.XII MM466, ME-R, which shot down seven enemy aircraft between July 1944 and November 1944, after which the aircraft was passed on to No. 409 Squadron, with which it shot down another four. In its night fighter incarnation, No. 488 Squadron flew 2899 sorties, shot down 67 aircraft and, in its intruder role, destroyed 40 trains. In one notable sortie in July 1944, Flight Lieutenant George Jameson and his radar operator Norman Crookes shot down four enemy aircraft. Flight Lieutenant Kenneth Stewart, who flew with radar operator Harold Brumby, was the last pilot of the squadron to become a flying ace. Pilots of the squadron were awarded five Distinguished Flying Crosses, a Distinguished Service Order and an Air Force Cross.

No. 488 Squadron was unique in that it was the only "Article XV" New Zealand unit to have two distinct and separate roles, in different theatres, during World War Two.

In December 2010, the new headquarters formed to command the RNZAF units stationed at RNZAF Base Ohakea was named No. 488 Wing RNZAF in honour of No. 488 Squadron. This unit was disbanded in early 2015.

== Aircraft operated ==
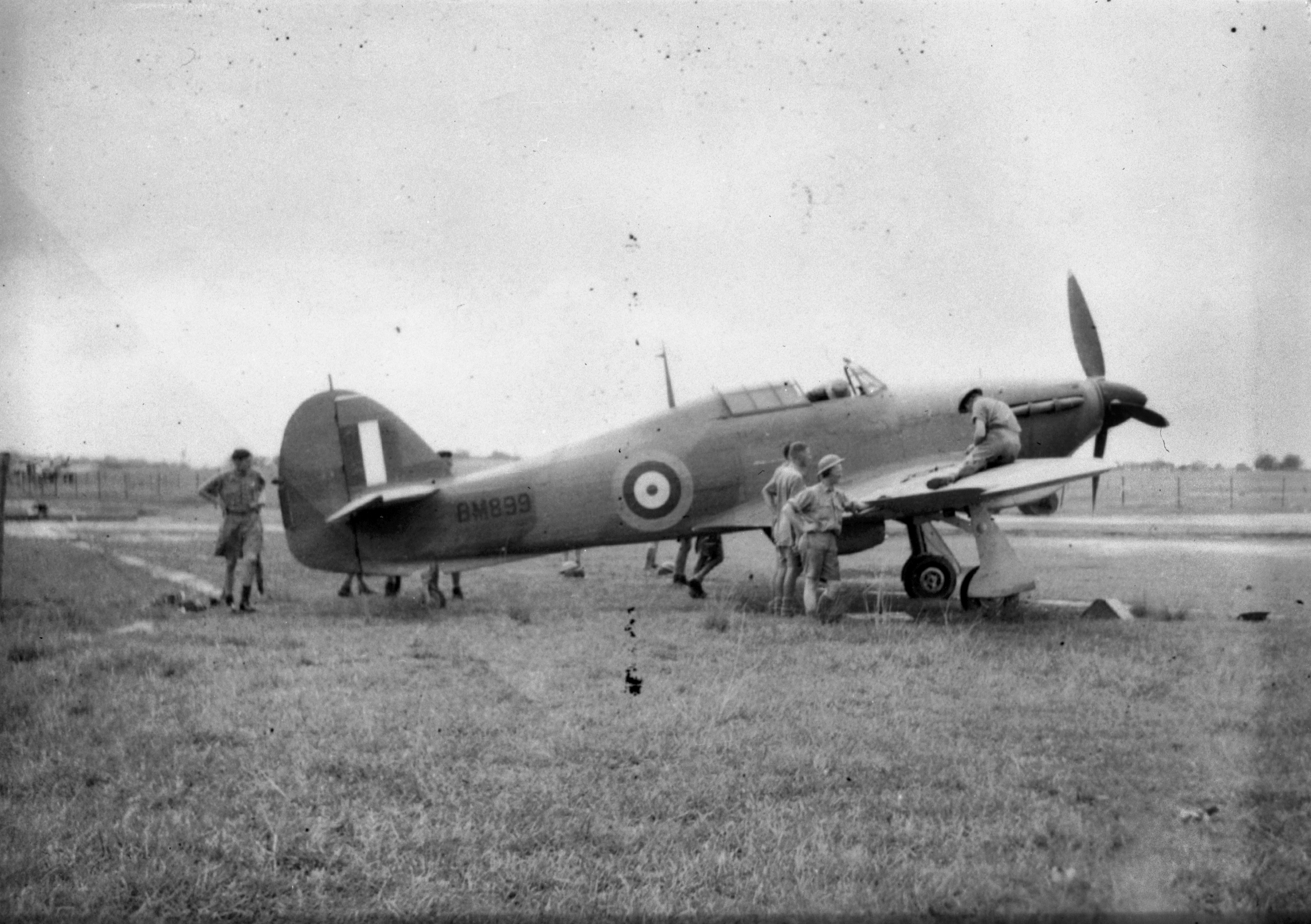
Hawker Hurricane Mk.IIB/Trop at RAF Kallang, January 1942

Aircraft operated by No. 488 Squadron RNZAF
Period	Aircraft
October 1941 to January 1942	Brewster Buffalo Mk.I
January 1942 to February 1942	Hawker Hurricane Mk.IIb
June 1942 to March 1943	Bristol Beaufighter Mk.IIf
March 1943 to September 1943	Bristol Beaufighter Mk.VIf
August 1943 to May 1944	de Havilland Mosquito Mk.XII
October 1943 to September 1944	de Havilland Mosquito Mk.XIII
September 1944 to April 1945	de Havilland Mosquito Mk.XXX

== Squadron bases ==
Bases and airfields used by No. 488 Squadron RNZAF
From	To	Base	Notes
1 September 1941	2 September 1941	Rongotai, New Zealand	Formed here
2 September 1941	10 October 1941	en route to Singapore	
10 October 1941	2 February 1942	RAF Kallang, Singapore	Det. at Kluang, Malaysia
2 February 1942	9 February 1942	Palembang, Sumatra, Dutch East Indies	
9 February 1942	23 February 1942	Tjililitan, Java, Dutch East Indies	
23 February 1942	1 March 1942	en route to Australia	
1 March 1942	2 March 1942	Fremantle, Australia	Disbanded here
25 June 1942	1 September 1942	RAF Church Fenton, Yorkshire	Reformed here
1 September 1942	3 August 1943	RAF Ayr, Ayrshire, Scotland	Dets at RAF Drem, East Lothian, Scotland and RAF Coltishall, Norfolk
3 August 1943	3 September 1943	RAF Drem, East Lothian, Scotland	
3 September 1943	3 May 1944	RAF Bradwell Bay, Essex	
3 May 1944	11 May 1944	RAF Colerne, Wiltshire	
11 May 1944	28 July 1944	RAF Zeals, Wiltshire	
28 July 1944	9 October 1944	RAF Colerne, Wiltshire	
9 October 1944	15 November 1944	RAF Hunsdon, Hertfordshire	
15 November 1944	5 April 1945	B.48/Amiens-Glisy, France	Advanced landing ground
5 April 1945	26 April 1945	B.77/Gilze-Rijen, Netherlands	Disbanded here

== Commanding officers ==
The following served as commanding officers of No. 488 Squadron:

- Squadron Leader W. G. Clouston (October 1941–January 1942);
- Squadron Leader J. N. MacKenzie (January–March 1942);
- Wing Commander R. M. Trousdale (June 1942–March 1943);
- Wing Commander J. Nesbitt-Dufort (March–July 1943);
- Wing Commander A. R. Burton-Giles (July–September 1943);
- Wing Commander P. H. Hamley (September 1943–January 1944);
- Wing Commander R. C. Haine (January–October 1944); and
- Wing Commander R. G. Watts (October 1944–April 1945).
