= No. 125 Squadron RAF =

Defunct flying squadron of the Royal Air Force

No. 125 (Newfoundland) Squadron RAF
- Active: 1 February 1918 – 1 April 1918 (RFC); 1 April 1918 – 1 August 1918 (RAF); 16 June 1941 – 20 November 1945; 31 March 1955 – 10 May 1957
- Country: United Kingdom
- Branch: Royal Air Force
- Role: Fighter Command / Night Fighter
- Nickname: Newfoundland
- Mottos: Latin: Nunquam domandi ("Never to be tamed")
- Battle honours: • World War II • Home Defence • Operation Overlord

Insignia
- Squadron Badge heraldry: On a mount, a caribou. Approved by King George VI in April 1944. (The caribou is the official animal of Newfoundland)
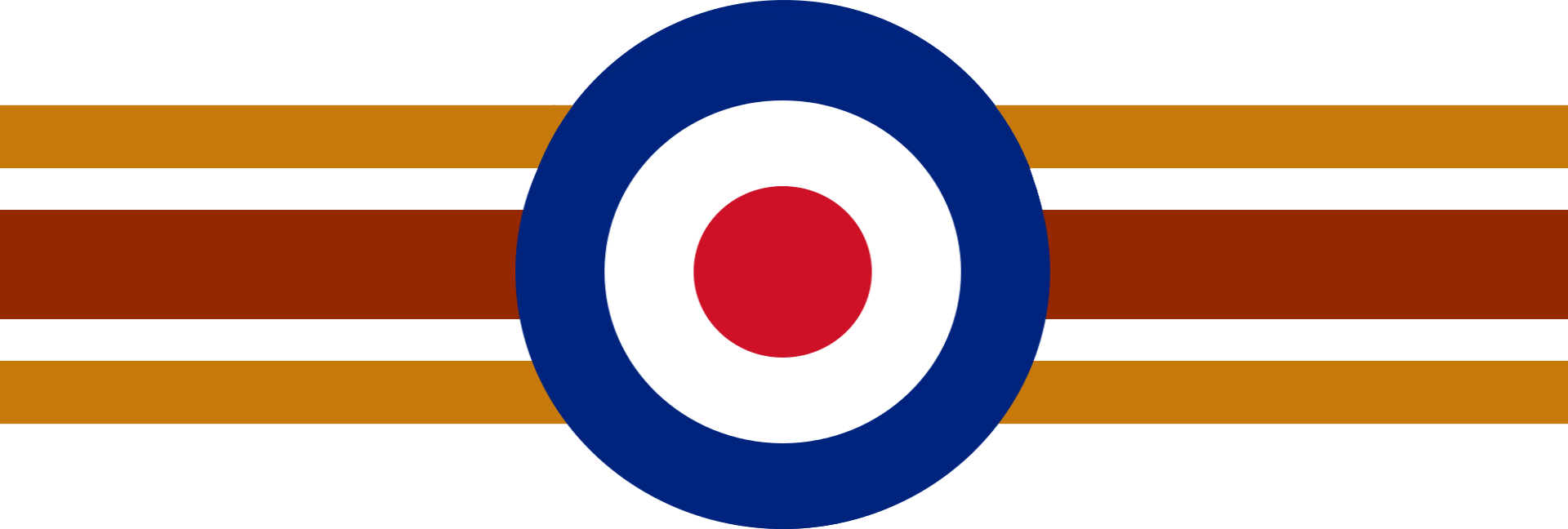
- Squadron roundel
- Squadron Codes: FN (Apr 1939 – Sep 1939); VA (Jun 1941 – Nov 1945)

Number 125 (Newfoundland) Squadron was a Royal Air Force squadron active during World War II and briefly in the mid-1950s. Throughout its service the squadron primarily operated night fighters.

== History ==
=== First World War ===
No. 125 Squadron was initially formed at Old Sarum, Wiltshire on 1 February 1918 as a light bomber squadron of the Royal Flying Corps, operating Airco DH.4 and DH.9s. It was planned for the squadron to become operational and deploy to France in September however it was instead disbanded on 1 August 1918, thus never seeing active service in the First World War.

=== Second World War ===
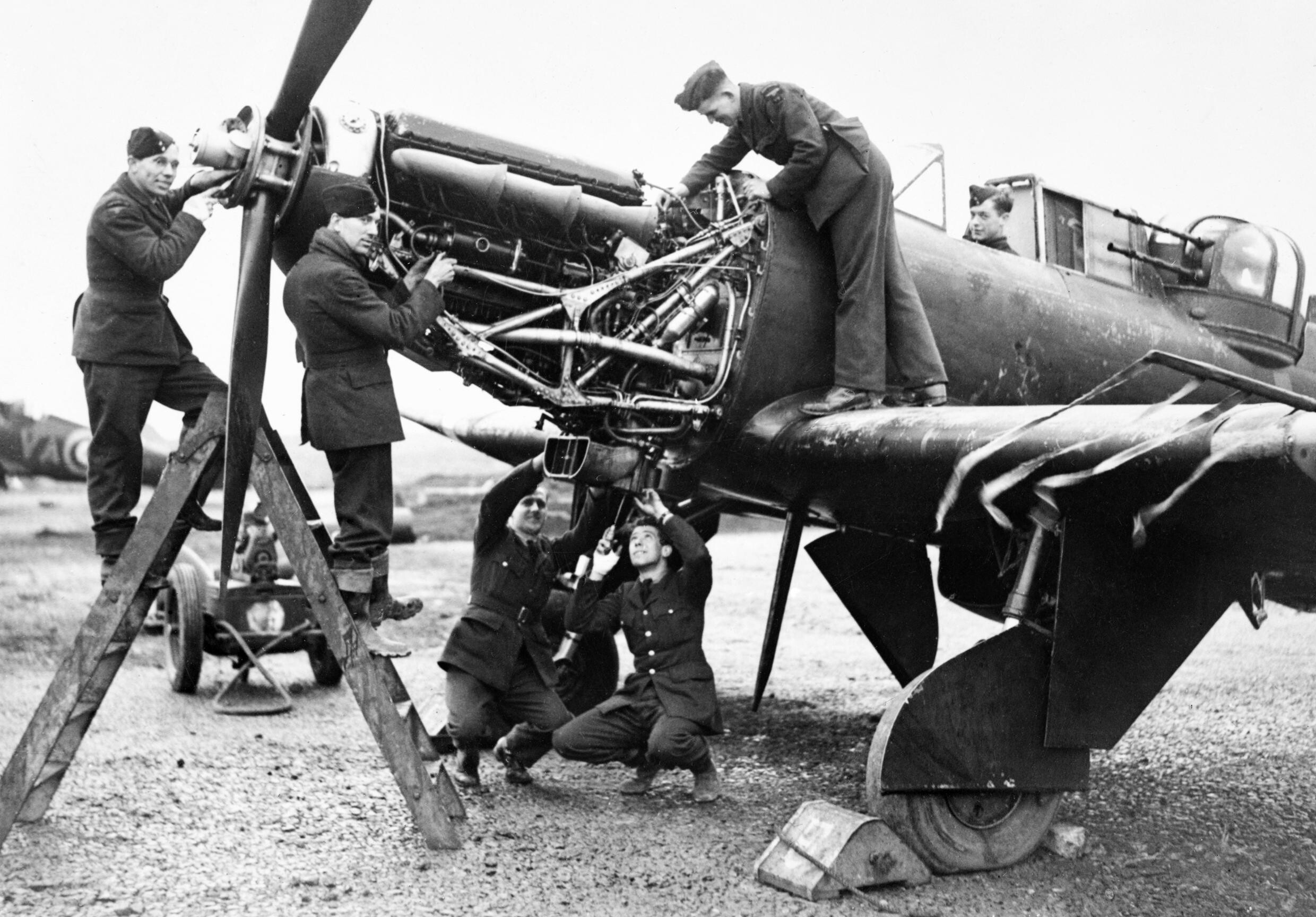
A Boulton-Paul Defiant of No. 125 Squadron under repair at RAF Fairwood Common, Wales in January 1942.

No. 125 Squadron was reformed on 16 June 1941 at RAF Colerne equipped with Bolton-Paul Defiant night fighters. The squadron was raised as a result of a war loan raised by the Newfoundland Commission of Government in 1940. After discovering a surplus of revenue, the commission presented the British Government with $500,000 to establish a squadron with the hope that it would be manned by Newfoundlanders. This hope was realised with at least a dozen Newfoundlanders flying with No. 125 Squadron in its early days along with a contingent of English, Scottish, Welsh, Commonwealth and Polish pilots.

On 24 September 1941, the squadron moved to RAF Fairwood Common, Wales and became fully operational, with the Defiant proving to be a more than effective night fighter. By February 1942, No. 125 Squadron began to convert over to the twin-engined Bristol Beaufighter, with these becoming operational by 21 April. Defiants and Hawker Hurricanes were also used to supplement the Beaufighters in the squadron's patrols. With an increasing number of Newfoundlanders being found in No. 125 Squadron's ranks, some aircrew began to name their aircraft in recognition of their Newfoundland heritage: St, John's, Corner Brook, Deer Lake and Buchans were some of the names they used. From October to December 1942, the squadron operated a detachment at RAF Sumburgh in the Shetland Islands.

No. 125 Squadron moved north to RAF Valley on 14 November 1943 in order to carry out patrols over the Irish Sea. While based here the squadron operated a detachment from RAF Ballyhalbert in Northern Ireland. Despite being a 'Newfoundland' squadron, by November 1943 only 5 of the 30 aircrew were from Newfoundland as well as 45 of the roughly 200 ground crew came from the Dominion. With a conversion to de Havilland Mosquito night fighters in February 1944, No. 125 Squadron moved south to RAF Hurn, Dorset at the end of March. This was in preparation to cover the Operation Overlord landings in Normandy. In April, No. 125 Squadron had their caribou squadron badge officially approved by King George VI. The squadron also participated in intercepting Operation Steinbock raids from January to May 1944. With a bridgehead secured in France and with the commencement of V-1 flying bomb attacks on London, the squadron moved to RAF Middle Wallop in July 1944 to fly night time interceptions. During this time it also flew patrols from RAF Bradwell Bay over the Low Countries.

On 18 October 1944, No. 125 Squadron moved to RAF Coltishall, Norfolk. From Coltishall the squadron defended against enemy intruders and Heinkel He 111s carrying flying bombs, as well as undertaking reconnaissance to locate the remainder of German shipping. On 24 April 1945, No. 125 Squadron transferred up to RAF Church Fenton in Yorkshire. Here it saw out the war before disbanding for the second time on 20 November 1945 when its aircraft and personnel were renumbered to No. 264 Squadron. By the end of the war No. 125 Squadron had managed to score 44 victories, 5 probables and 20 damaged.

=== Postwar ===
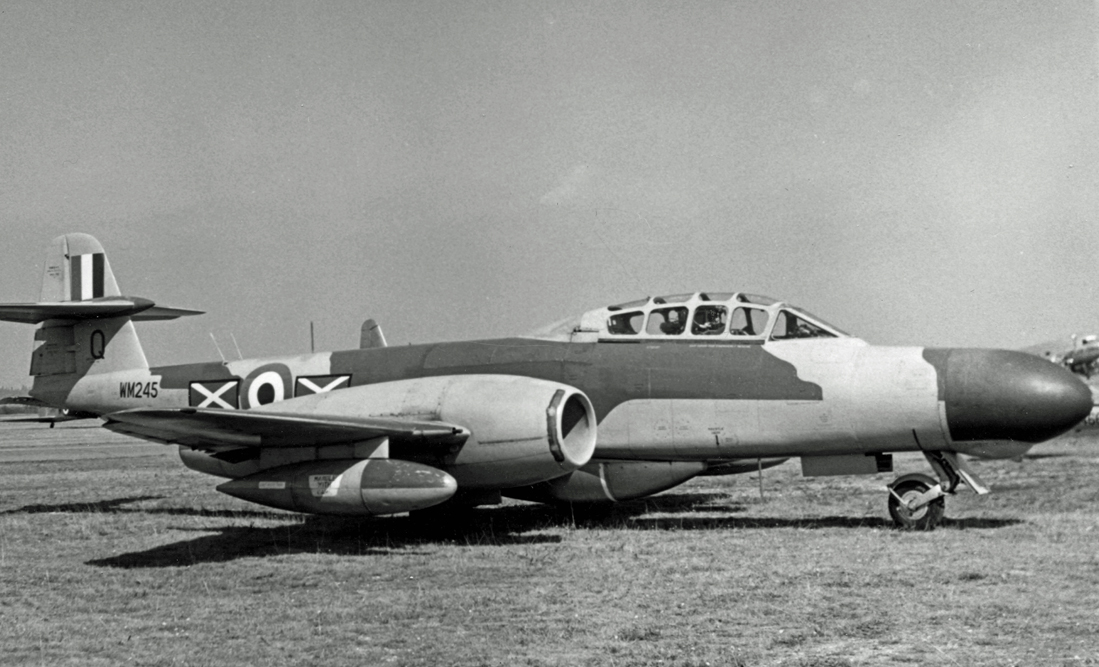
A Gloster Meteor NF.11, much like those that No. 125 Squadron operated in 1955.

No. 125 Squadron reformed on 31 March 1955 at RAF Stradishall, Suffolk as a night fighter unit operating Gloster Meteor NF.11s. In November 1955, the squadron converted to the de Havilland Venom NF.3. These remained with the squadron until it was disbanded for the final time on 10 May 1957. While based at Stradishall, the squadron operated alongside fellow night fighter units No. 89 Squadron and No. 152 Squadron, as well as No. 245 Squadron who flew Meteors and Hawker Hunters.

== Aircraft operated ==
- Airco DH.4 (1918)
- Airco DH.9 (1918)
- Boulton-Paul Defiant I (June 1941–October 1941)
- Boulton-Paul Defiant II (October 1941–August 1942)
- Hawker Hurricane (1942)
- Bristol Beaufighter IIF (February 1942–September 1942)
- Bristol Beaufighter VI (September 1942–February 1944)
- De Havilland Mosquito NF.XVII (February 1944–March 1945)
- De Havilland Mosquito NF.30 (March 1945–November 1945)
- Gloster Meteor NF.11 (March 1955–November 1955)
- De Havilland Venom NF.3 (November 1955–May 1957)
