= No. 140 Squadron RAF =

Defunct flying squadron of the Royal Air Force

- Active: 1918-1918; 1941-1945
- Country: United Kingdom
- Branch: Royal Air Force
- Role: Photo Reconnaissance
- Motto: Foresight

No. 140 Squadron of the Royal Air Force was a Second World War photo-reconnaissance squadron that operated between 1941 and 1945.

== History ==
Briefly formed during the First World War on 1 May 1918 at RAF Biggin Hill as a home defence squadron with Bristol F.2B Fighters, although by then German air-raids on south-east England had stopped and the squadron never went operational. It was disbanded on 4 July 1918.

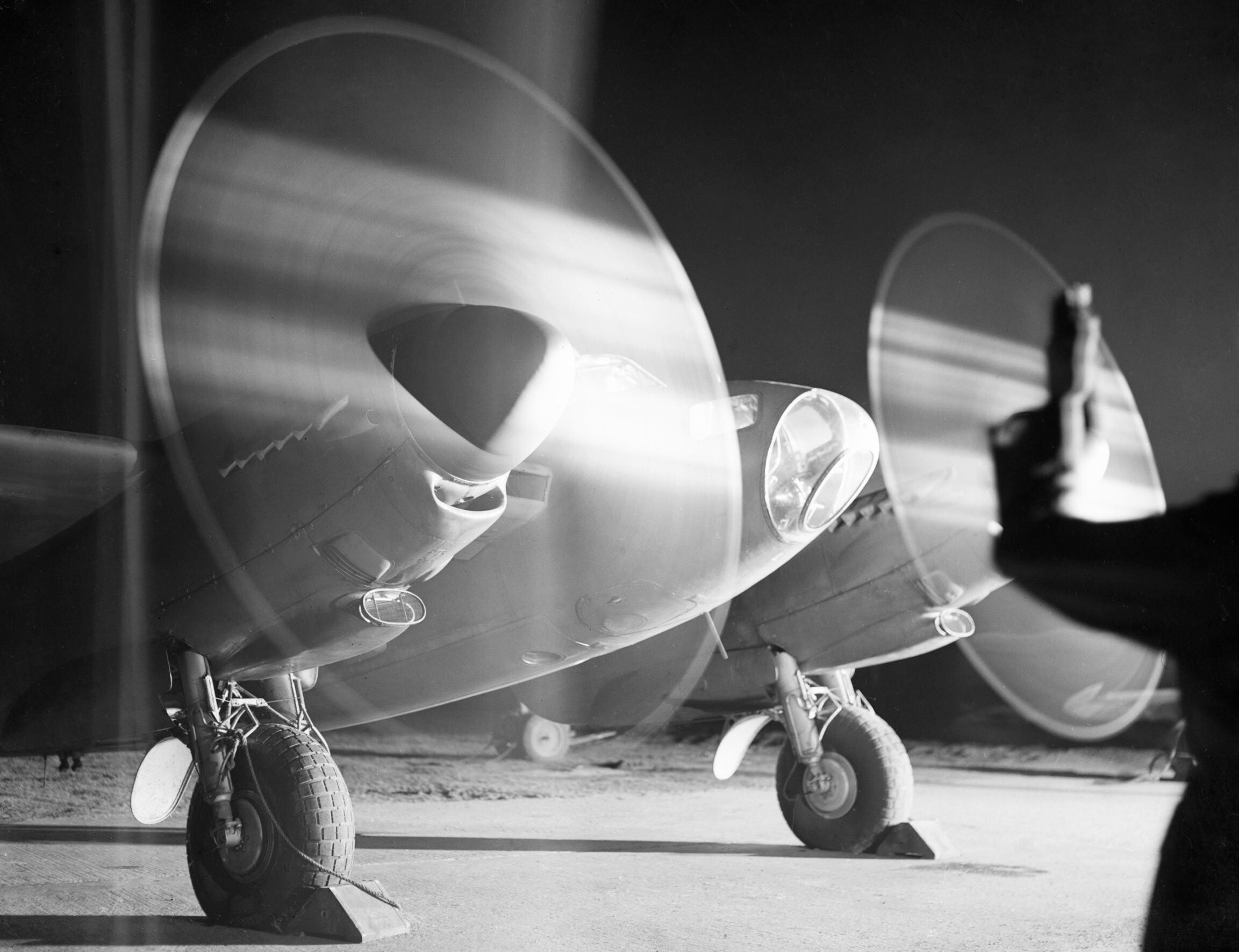
One of No. 140 Squadron's de Havilland Mosquito heavy fighters preparing to take off on a sortie, February 1945

On 10 March 1941 No. 1416 Flight was formed at RAF Hendon in London, equipped with six Supermarine Spitfire I PR Type G fighter-reconnaissance aircraft. The flight was part of RAF Army Cooperation Command and was intended to provide a dedicated reconnaissance resource to meet the demands of the British Army. The flight worked up and trained its crews during the spring and summer of 1941, supplementing its Spitfires with twin-engine Bristol Blenheims for longer-range operations from July. On 5 September the flight moved to RAF Benson, the base of No. 1 PRU and on 14 September it flew its first operational sortie when a single Spitfire photographed the town of Saint-Vaast-la-Hougue on the Cotentin Peninsula and nearby beaches. This was the first mission over France flown by Army Cooperation Command.

No. 1416 Flight was redesignated No. 140 Squadron on 17 September 1941 at Benson, with an initial equipment of six Spitfires and six Blenheims, all fitted with cameras. The squadron flew photo reconnaissance sorties over northern France, using the Spitfire during the day for both high- and low-level operations. Its Blenheims were mainly confined to flying at night owing to its vulnerability to German fighters. It was later equipped with specialized photo-reconnaissance versions of the Spitfire. In 1942 the squadron operated a detachment at RAF St. Eval in Cornwall to photograph the French ports on the Atlantic coast. The Blenheims were not very successful in the night role and were replaced in 1943 with Lockheed Venturas, although these were not used much in operations.

To support the forthcoming invasion of France the squadron was involved in detailed photography of coastal installations as well as photographing other targets and general mapping. With the introduction in 1943 of the de Havilland Mosquito the squadron was able to cover more ground and fly deeper into France. Later with the radar equipped Mosquito PR.XVIs they were able to carry out blind night photography.

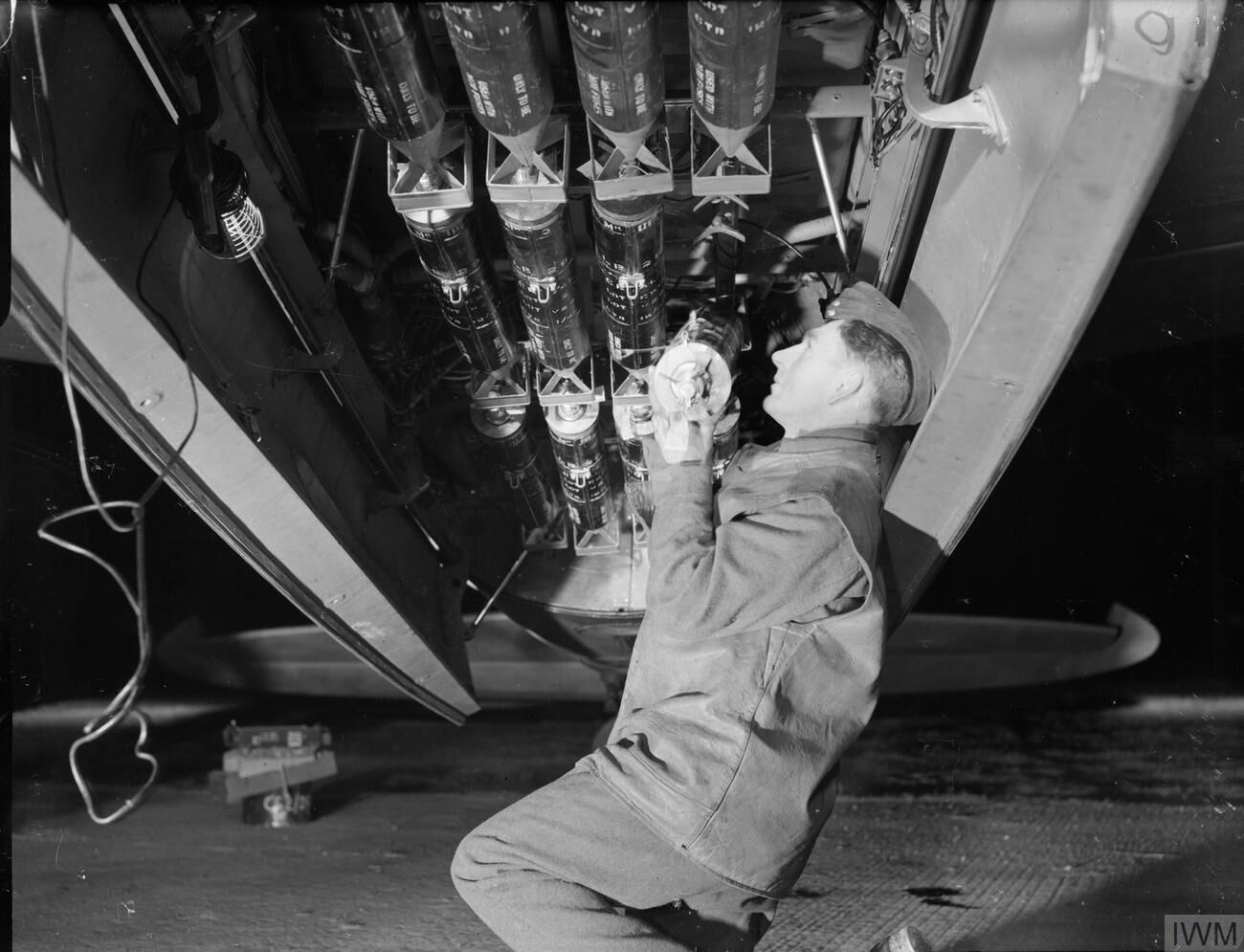
Armourer loading photoflash bombs into a De Havilland PR Mark XVI of No. 140 Squadron at B58/Melsbroek, Belgium, prior to a night photographic-reconnaissance sortie

The squadron moved into France following the invasion to support the action and then into Belgium operating throughout the winter of 1944–45. The squadron's final operational tasks were to carry out shipping reconnaissance along the Dutch and German coasts and with the war in Europe finished the Squadron returned to England and was disbanded at RAF Fersfield on 10 November 1945.

== Aircraft operated ==
Dates	Aircraft	Variant	Notes
1918	Bristol F.2B Fighter		
1941-1943	Supermarine Spitfire	PR Mk.IG and PR Mk. IV	
1941-1943	Bristol Blenheim	IV	
1943-1944	Lockheed Ventura	I	
1943-1944	Supermarine Spitfire	PR.VII and XI	
1943-1944	de Havilland Mosquito	IX	
1943-1945	de Havilland Mosquito	XVI	

== See also ==
- List of Royal Air Force aircraft squadrons
