= No. 67 Squadron RAF =

Defunct flying squadron of the Royal Air Force

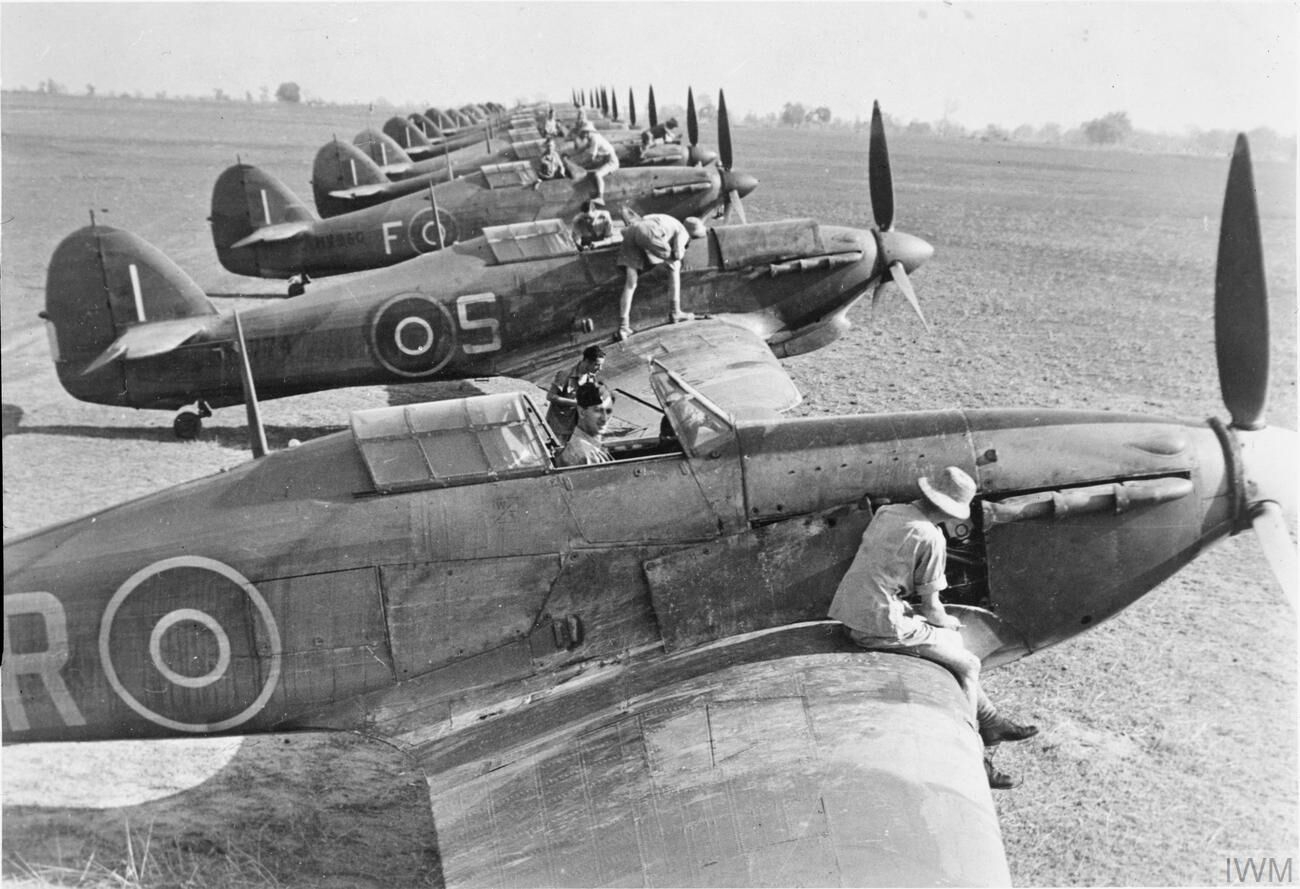
- Hawker Hurricanes of 67 Squadron lined up at Chittagong, India. May 1943
- Active: 12 Mar 1941 – 23 Aug 1945; 1 Sep 1950 – 31 May 1957
- Country: United Kingdom
- Branch: Royal Air Force
- Type: inactive
- Role: Fighter
- Motto(s): No odds too great

Insignia
- Badge: A drongo volant
- Squadron Codes: RD (1941–1945)
- Squadron Roundel

The name No. 67 Squadron has been used by the Royal Flying Corps and the Royal Air Force for two quite different units.

== History ==
=== World War I ===
During the First World War, No. 1 Squadron, Australian Flying Corps – formed at Point Cook in January 1916, – was referred to by British authorities from 16 March 1916 to February 1918 as "No. 67 Squadron RFC" to avoid confusion with No. 1 Squadron, RFC, not to mention No. 1 Squadron, RNAS, and because the AFC was in any case not recognised as being independent of the RFC. Early in 1918 this recognition was belatedly granted, and thereafter the unit was known in all quarters by its original designation. The unit itself never regarded itself as part of the RFC, and never used its official RFC number – it is considered as the "ancestor" of No. 1 Squadron RAAF and has no real connection with the later RAF unit. (Note: The war diary of 67 Squadron is not held by the Australian War Memorial, although they do have No. 1 Squadron's war diary from January 1918.)

In particular, at the time of the formation of the RAF in April 1918 there was no "No. 67 Squadron RFC" to become an RAF unit of that number. Hence the first No. 67 Squadron RAF was the one formed during the Second World War – and described hereunder.

=== World War II ===
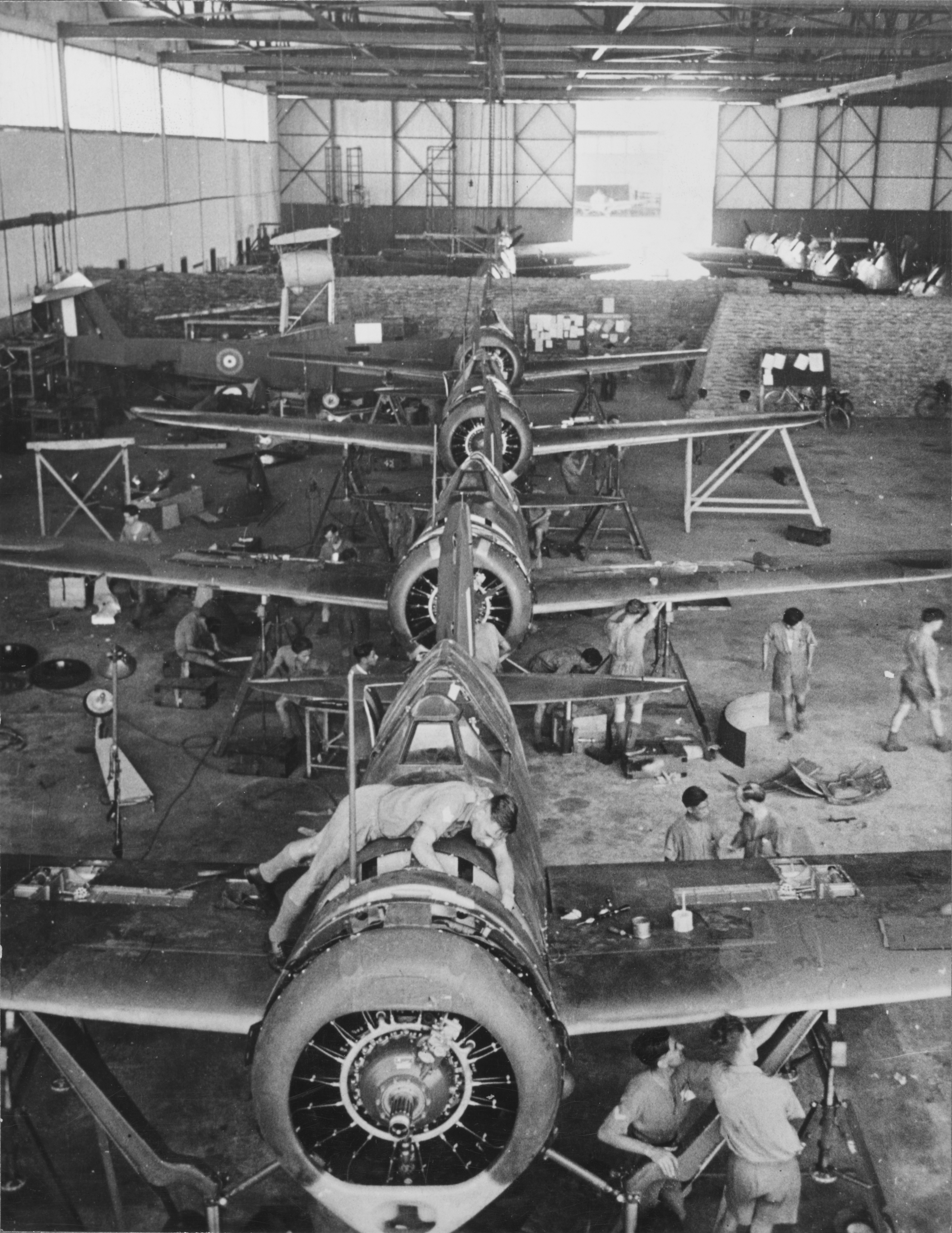
Brewster Buffaloes of 67 Squadron being re-assembled at Singapore following shipment from the USA. February 1941

The true origins of No. 67 Squadron RAF date from its so-called "re-formation" during World War II at RAF Kallang in Malaya on 12 March 1941. It was equipped with the Brewster Buffalo, an aeroplane that was outclassed in Europe, but considered adequate to build up the defences in Asia. In October, it handed on its aircraft to No. 488 Squadron RNZAF and moved to Burma, taking on instead the Buffaloes of No. 60 Squadron RAF. The inadequacy of the Buffaloes led to their replacement with Hawker Hurricanes in February 1942, but the Japanese offensive could not be halted and by March 1942 the squadron "ceased to be effective". The squadron re-assembled at Alipore and formed part of the defence of Calcutta, converting to Spitfires in February 1944. The squadron disbanded officially on 23 August 1945 at RAF Akyab, but kept its aircraft till the end of the month.

=== The Jet Age ===
On 1 September 1950 the squadron reformed as a jet fighter-bomber unit, flying Vampire FB.5s first from RAF Wattisham and later from Gutersloh as part of RAF Germany. After a short return to the UK in April 1952, being stationed at RAF Duxford on 21 April 1952, the squadron moved again to Germany in May 1952 when it moved base to Wildenrath and re-equipped there in May 1953 with Canadair Sabres. In July 1955 the squadron moved to another base again, RAF Bruggen and the Sabres were exchanged for Hunters. On 31 May 1957 the squadron disbanded and has not been active since.

== See also ==
- List of Royal Air Force aircraft squadrons
