= RAF Bradwell Bay =

Former RAF station in Essex, England

RAF Bradwell Bay
- Near Bradwell-on-Sea, Essex in England
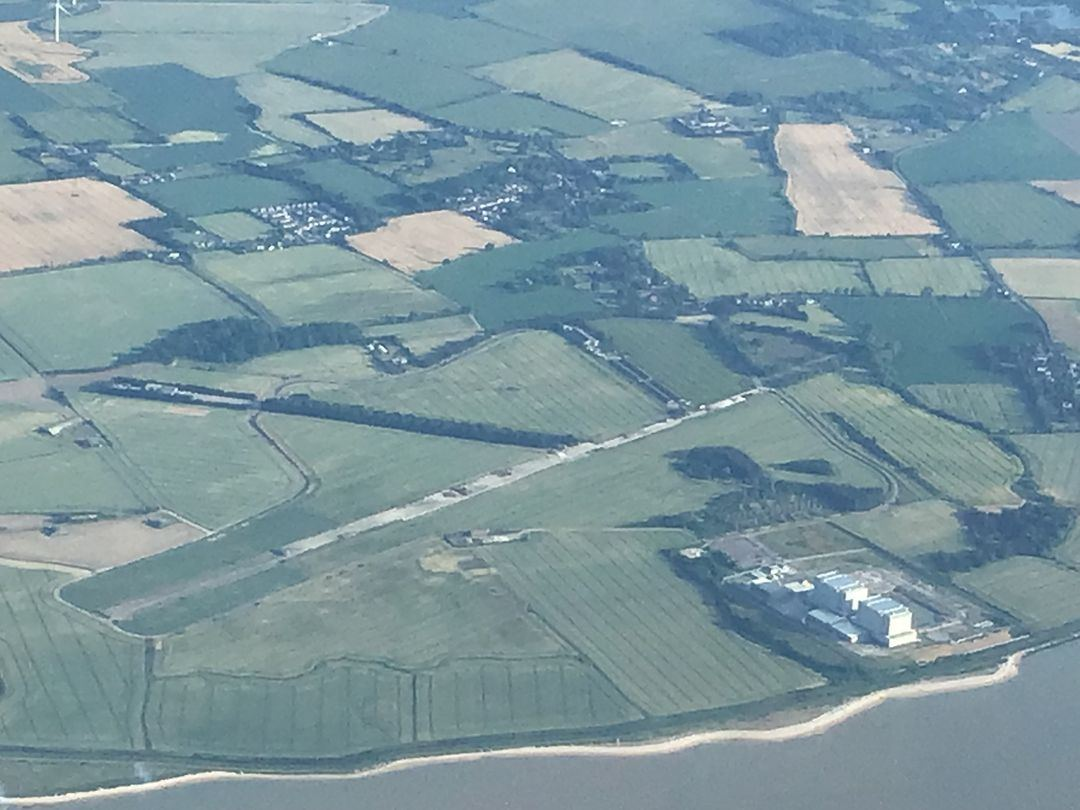
- RAF Bradwell Bay, June 2023.

Site information
- Type: Royal Air Force station
- Code: RB
- Owner: Air Ministry
- Operator: Royal Air Force
- Controlled by: RAF Fighter Command * No. 11 Group RAF; Second Tactical Air Force

Location
- Shown within Essex RAF Bradwell Bay (the United Kingdom)
- Coordinates: 51°44′07″N 000°54′06″E

Site history
- Built: 1940/41
- In use: November 1941 - 1946
- Battles/wars: European theatre of World War II

Airfield information
- Elevation: 30 feet (9 m) AMSL
Runways
Direction	Length and surface
04/22	Tarmac/Asphalt
10/28	Tarmac/Asphalt
16/34	Tarmac/Asphalt

Royal Air Force Bradwell Bay or more simply RAF Bradwell Bay is a former Royal Air Force station located 9 miles (14 km) east of Maldon, Essex, England and 3 miles (5 km) south west of West Mersea, Essex.

== History ==
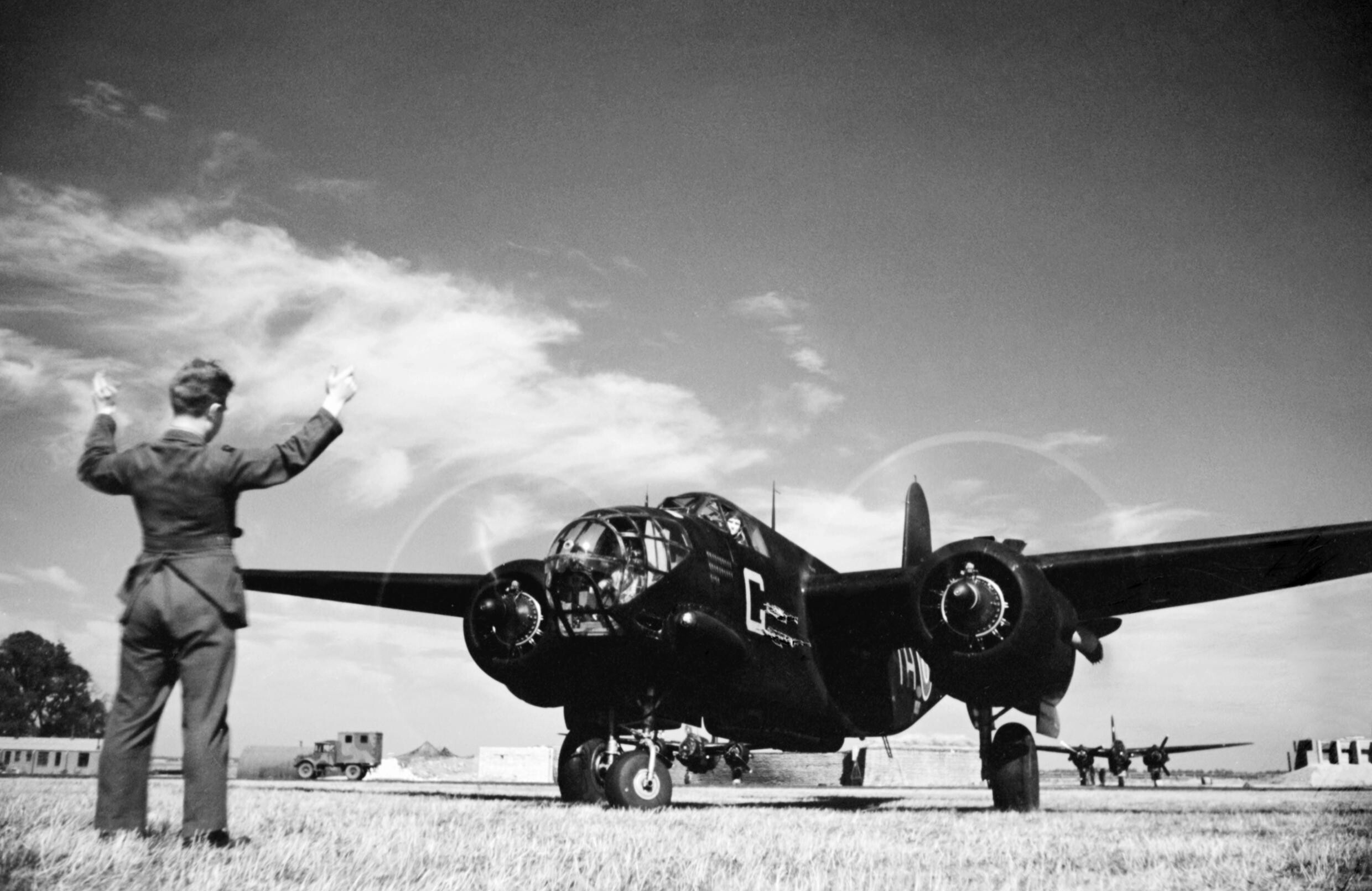
Douglas Boston Mk III aircraft of No. 418 Squadron RCAF taxiing at Bradwell Bay, Essex, prior to a night intruder raid over France, September 1942 CH7210

The central area of the current airfield was first laid down before WW2 as a grass-surfaced landing ground for the nearby Dengie firing ranges off the coast before being rebuilt from 1940 onwards as an enlarged RAF station with concrete runways, hangars and ancillary buildings. The station is unique as it was the only fighter station where the Fog Investigation and Dispersal Operation (FIDO) was used. The USAAF took aerial photographs in 1944 which were published in 2023.

== Based units ==
- No. 3 Squadron RAF (1944)
- No. 19 Squadron RAF
- No. 23 Squadron RAF (1942)
- No. 25 Squadron RAF
- No. 29 Squadron RAF (1943)
- No. 56 Squadron RAF (1943)
- No. 64 Squadron RAF (1944)
- No. 68 Squadron RAF
- No. 85 Squadron RAF
- No. 124 (Baroda) Squadron RAF (1944)
- No. 125 (Newfoundland) Squadron RAF
- No. 126 (Persian Gulf) Squadron RAF (1944)
- No. 151 Squadron RAF (1945)
- No. 157 Squadron RAF (1943)
- No. 198 Squadron RAF (1943)
- No. 219 (Mysore) Squadron RAF (1944)
- No. 247 (China-British) Squadron RAF (1943)
- No. 264 (Madras Presidency) Squadron RAF
- No. 278 Squadron RAF (1944)
- No. 287 Squadron RAF (1945)
- No. 309 Polish Fighter-Reconnaissance Squadron
- No. 310 (Czechoslovak) Squadron RAF (1944-45)
- No. 312 (Czechoslovak) Squadron RAF (1944-45)
- No. 313 (Czechoslovak) Squadron RAF (1944-45)
- No. 418 Squadron RCAF (1942-43)
- No. 456 Squadron RAAF (1945)
- No. 488 Squadron RNZAF (1943-44)
- No. 501 (County of Gloucester) Squadron AAF (1944-45)
- No. 605 (County of Warwick) Squadron AAF (1943-44)
- No. 611 (West Lancashire) Squadron AAF (1944)

Units

- No. 2 Armament Practice Camp RAF
- No. 2 Armament Practice Station RAF (July 1945 – February 1946)
- No. 3 Fighter Command Servicing Unit
- No. 5 Fighter Command Servicing Unit
- No. 111 (Transport) Wing RAF (November 1944 – July 1945)
- No. 134 (Czech) (Fighter) Wing (December 1944 – February 1945)
- No. 150 Airfield Headquarters RAF (March – April 1944)
- No. 1332 Wing RAF Regiment
- No. 1333 Wing RAF Regiment
- No. 2727 Squadron RAF Regiment
- No. 2730 Squadron RAF Regiment
- No. 2739 Squadron RAF Regiment
- No. 2831 Squadron RAF Regiment
- No. 2840 Squadron RAF Regiment
- No. 3208 Servicing Commando
- No. 4101 Anti-Aircraft Flight RAF Regiment

== Current use ==
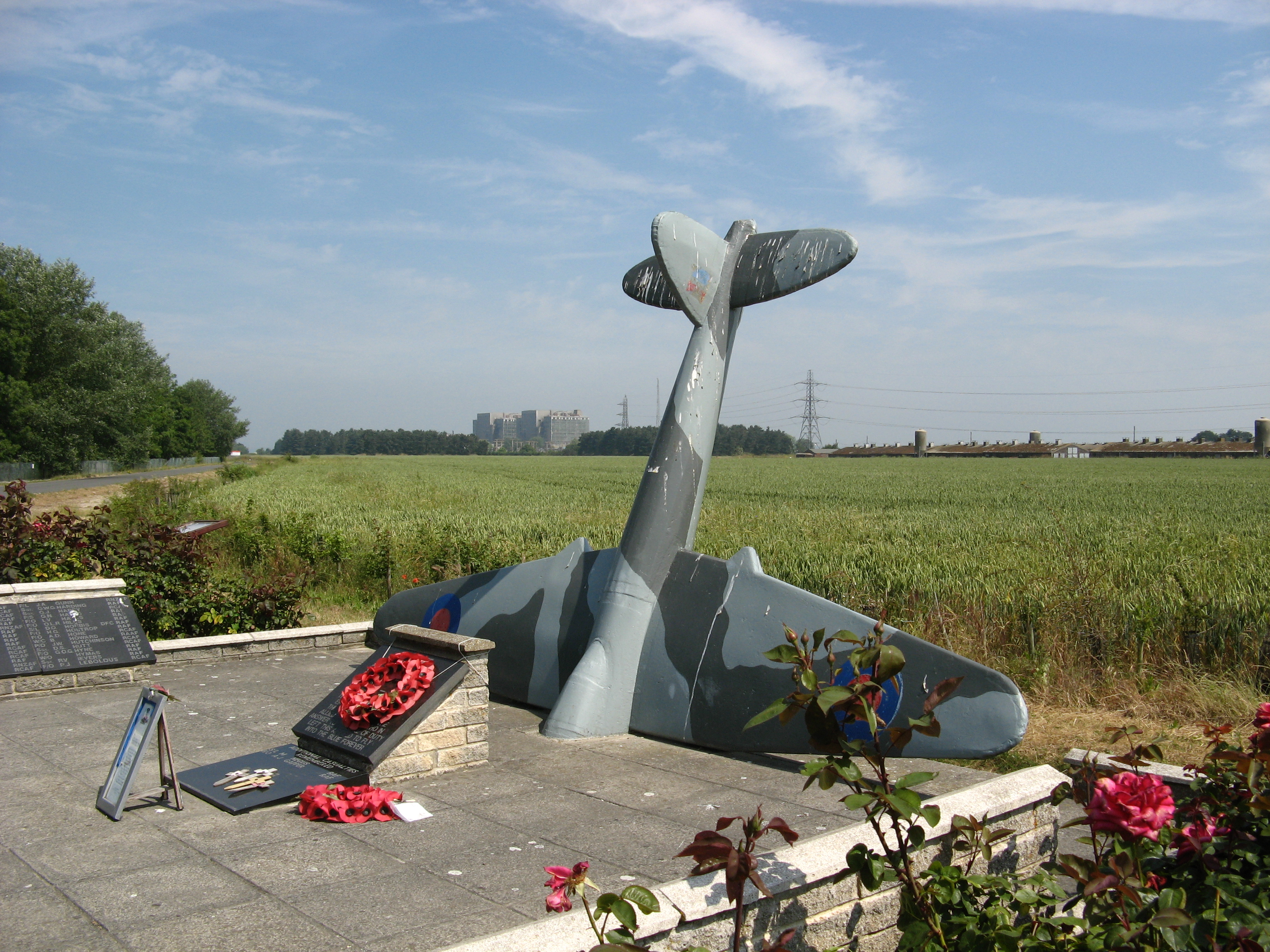
The memorial to airfield aircrews lost during World War 2. Many of the airfields had re-equipped with the de Havilland Mosquito (depicted)

An area of the northern part of the site is occupied by the remains of the Bradwell nuclear power station, the Magnox element of which is currently being decommissioned. Several of the hangars are still used as storage by the local farmers and the control tower is now a private house. Agricultural buildings, built in the '70s and '80s on runways one and two, are now home to several local businesses.

== Bradwell Bay Preservation Group ==
The Bradwell Bay Preservation Group was created to preserve the memory of people that served at Bradwell Bay. They are a not for profit organisation run by local history enthusiasts, and are fundraising to build a museum near the current memorial.

== See also ==
- List of former Royal Air Force stations
