= Evan Mackie =

New Zealand fighter pilot (1917–1986)

Evan Dall Mackie
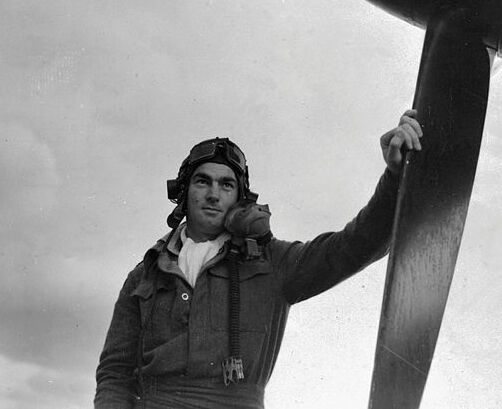
- Born: 31 October 1917; Waihi, New Zealand
- Died: 28 April 1986 (aged 68); Tauranga, New Zealand
- Military career
- Allegiance: New Zealand
- Branch: Royal New Zealand Air Force
- Service years: 1941–1947
- Rank: Wing Commander
- Nickname: Rosie
- Service number: 41520
- Commands: No. 122 Wing; No. 80 Squadron; No. 92 Squadron; No. 243 Squadron
- Conflicts: Second World War; Channel Front; Tunisian campaign; Allied invasion of Sicily; Italian campaign; Western Allied invasion of Germany
- Awards: Distinguished Service Order; Distinguished Flying Cross & Bar; Distinguished Flying Cross (United States)

Evan Dall "Rosie" Mackie, DSO, DFC & Bar (31 October 1917 – 28 April 1986) was a New Zealand fighter pilot and flying ace of the Second World War. Credited with at least 23 aerial victories, he was the highest scoring flying ace to serve with the Royal New Zealand Air Force (RNZAF).

Born in Waihi, Mackie worked as an apprentice electrician before joining the RNZAF in January 1941. He initially trained at Whenuapai before going onto further flight training in Canada. He then proceeded to the United Kingdom to serve with the Royal Air Force. After his arrival, he converted to the Supermarine Spitfire fighter and after completing his course, he served as an instructor. He was posted to No. 485 Squadron with which he achieved his first aerial victories on the Channel Front. In February 1943, he was transferred to North Africa where he served with No. 243 Squadron. He was responsible for destroying a number of German and Italian aircraft during his time with the squadron, which he commanded from June to October during the campaigns in Sicily and Italy. He was transferred away from the squadron as punishment for condoning the misappropriation of a vehicle by his staff. However, he was shortly afterwards assigned to command of No. 92 Squadron.

Rested from flight duties in April 1944, he served in a training role for a number of months but by the end of the year was back on operations with No. 122 Wing, flying Hawker Tempests. Given command of No. 80 Squadron in mid-January 1945, he led it through the invasion of Germany until early May, when he became wing commander (flying) of No. 122 Wing. He remained in this role until the wing was disbanded in September. Not keen on pursuing a career in the military, he was discharged from the RNZAF in January 1947 and in later life worked as an electrician. He died of cancer on 28 April 1986.

== Early life ==
Evan Dall Mackie was born in Waihi, New Zealand, on 31 October 1917, one of five children of Thomas Mackie, an engine driver, and his wife Katherine Mackie (née McIntosh). He attended Waihi East Primary School and from 1931, Waihi District High School. Due to the economic climate, he did not complete his formal education and from 1933 worked a series of menial jobs to help support his family. The tough physical labour that he performed during this early employment apparently contributed to his strong build and a ruddy complexion; in his later years, the latter attribute earned him the nickname "Rosie".

Mackie began studying part-time at the Waihi School of Mines from 1934, doing two hours most evenings after his work. Late the following year he obtained temporary work as a junior electrician with Martha Gold Mining Coy (Waihi) Ltd., and went to work at the largest gold mine in New Zealand. This ultimately led to an apprenticeship with the company.

== Second World War ==
Prior to the outbreak of the Second World War, Mackie enrolled in a correspondence course to prepare prospective aircrew for the Royal New Zealand Air Force (RNZAF). He did well in the course and this led to his application in May 1940 to join the RNZAF. He successfully completed the educational requirements and formally entered the RNZAF in January 1941 with the rank of leading aircraftman.

=== Flight training ===
After a period of basic training, in March Mackie proceeded to No. 4 Elementary Flying Training School at Whenuapai in Auckland where he experienced flying for the first time. His training was completed in early April; although rated as an average pilot by his instructors, he was his intake's best student in the academic component of the course. Mackie underwent further flight training in Canada, departing New Zealand at the end of April aboard the ocean liner Awatea.

At No. 32 Service Flying Training School, based at Moose Jaw in Saskatchewan, Mackie flew North American Harvard trainers. Although he had originally expressed a preference for flying duties involving multi-engined aircraft, by the end of his training in Canada he wanted to fly fighters. During his time in Canada, he became acquainted with fellow future flying ace George Jameson, who later described him as "a straightforward chap". Commissioned a pilot officer in August, he earned his aircrew brevet the same month, finishing top of his course. He was subsequently sent to the United Kingdom to serve with the Royal Air Force (RAF), departing from Halifax aboard the Dominion Monarch and arriving at Southampton in early September.

Mackie was sent to No. 58 Operational Training Unit at Grangemouth to learn to fly the Supermarine Spitfire fighter. Assessed as an above average pilot, he stayed on after completing his induction to the Spitfire to help train other pilots. Mackie later regarded the extra flying time that this gave him on Spitfires as advantageous when he began his operational flying. At the completion of his instructing duties, he was allowed to choose his operational posting and selected No. 485 Squadron; although part of the RAF, it was a "New Zealand" squadron which had been formed earlier in the year.

=== Channel Front ===
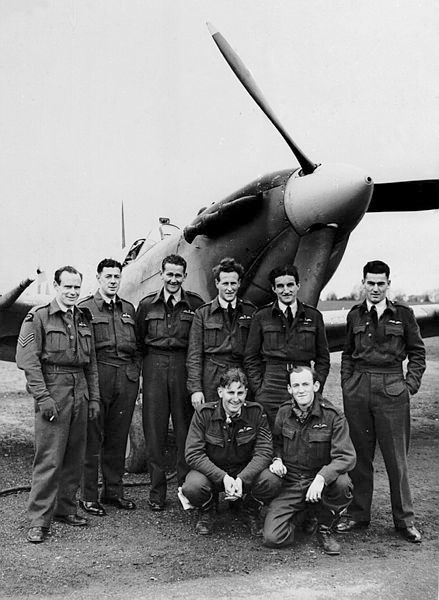
Mackie stands far right among a group of No. 485 Squadron pilots, 1942. He is next to fellow flying ace Bill Crawford-Compton while another New Zealand flying ace, Jack Rae, stands first left

At the time of Mackie's arrival at No. 485 Squadron in early December, it was based at Kenley as part of No. 11 Group and operating Spitfires. There were few offensive operations so much of his early flying with the unit was patrolling and carrying out air-sea rescues. On 12 February 1942, the squadron flew a mission escorting bombers attempting to disrupt the Channel Dash by the German battleships Scharnhorst and Gneisenau. This marked Mackie's first encounter with the Luftwaffe. His flight, led by Bill Crawford-Compton, pursued four Messerschmitt Bf 109 fighters sighted as the squadron neared the Belgian coast. Mackie expended his ammunition without success in the resulting encounter although Crawford-Compton destroyed one Bf 109.

Afterwards, the squadron resumed its normal duties but on 26 March, while escorting bombers to Le Havre, he shared in destroying a Bf 109; Crawford-Compton was the other pilot involved. Operations to France began to increase in number and exactly a month later Mackie was credited with the probable destruction of a Focke-Wulf Fw 190 fighter over Boulogne-Saint-Omer. His Spitfire was hit by flak in the port wing while crossing the French coast on the return flight to Kenley but he returned to base safely. In June he was appointed deputy commander of one of the squadron's flights. The following month, the squadron was withdrawn to Kings Cliffe, in No. 12 Group, for a period of less demanding duties of convoy patrols over the North Sea. However, it was still called upon to carry small scale low level sweeps, termed 'Rhubarbs' and involving two to six aircraft at a time, to northern France and the Low Countries.

No. 485 Squadron was one of several RAF fighter squadrons tasked with providing aerial cover for the Dieppe Raid on 19 August. It flew four patrols during the day; once during the landings as fighter cover, and then three times during the withdrawal. Mackie, who had been promoted to flying officer earlier in the month, only encountered the Luftwaffe during the first of these patrols, during which his Spitfire was lightly damaged by machine-gun fire. In October the squadron operated from Ballyhalbert in Northern Ireland for three weeks, proving aerial cover for ships leaving the northwestern ports of the United Kingdom with the Allied invasion force for Operation Torch, the invasion of French North Africa. It then returned to Kings Cliffe and resumed its duties with No. 12 Group.

In January 1943, No. 485 Squadron was sent back to No. 11 Group and was based at Westhampnett, as part of the Tangmere fighter wing. It was hampered by its Spitfire Mark Vbs, which were dated relative to the new Mark IX model that equipped many RAF fighter squadrons at this time. This limited much of its operations to second-tier work, such as air-sea rescue flights and coastal patrols. Mackie only flew a few operations in January, as he was posted to the Middle East at the end of the month.

=== North Africa ===
Sailing aboard the Monarch of Bermuda, Mackie arrived at Gibraltar in mid-February. After a period of leave, he was assigned a delivery flight of Spitfire Mark IXs that he was to lead to Maison Blanche, in Algeria. Handing over his aircraft on arrival, he was then posted to No. 243 Squadron, flying the Spitfire Mark Vc. His new unit was part of No. 324 Wing which operated under the auspices of the Northwest African Tactical Air Force and carried out offensive patrols and bomber escort missions. Mackie became one of the squadron's flight commanders.

On 7 April, while patrolling over Beja-Medjez el Bab, he and eleven other pilots of his squadron engaged several Junkers Ju 87 dive bombers. He destroyed two of them and damaged another. Two days later, with his commander, Squadron Leader James Walker, he shared in the destruction of a Bf 109. This was followed on 10 April with the sole credit for shooting down another Bf 109, oil from which being splattered across his windscreen.

Promoted to acting flight lieutenant on 12 April, Mackie shared in the destruction of a Bf 109 while patrolling over the squadron's aerodrome near Béja the next day, his wingman sharing the credit. He shot down a Bf 109 on 16 April and damaged a Fw 190 two days later. On 24 April, having earlier in the day destroyed a number of vehicles while strafing the road between Pont du Fahs and Bir-Mecherga, he and his flight became involved in a dogfight with a Bf 109. During the encounter, another Spitfire collided with him and as a result, Mackie had to forceland near Pont du Fahs, close to the headquarters of the 1st Armoured Division. He returned to his squadron the following day.

Flying a replacement Spitfire, Mackie destroyed one Bf 109 and damaged another on 27 April while on a sweep over Tunis with several other pilots from No. 243 Squadron. The pilot of the aircraft that he shot down became a prisoner of war. Mackie damaged another Bf 109 the next day. At the end of the month Mackie learned he was to be awarded the Distinguished Flying Cross (DFC); this would be the first such medal to be earned by a pilot of No. 243 Squadron. His DFC was formally announced in May, the published citation reading:

In operations in North Africa, this officer has displayed skilful [sic] leadership and great tenacity. He has destroyed 5 enemy aircraft, 4 of them within a period of eleven days in April, 1943. His courageous example has proved inspiring.

— London Gazette, No. 36022, 21 May 1943.

=== Sicily and Italy ===
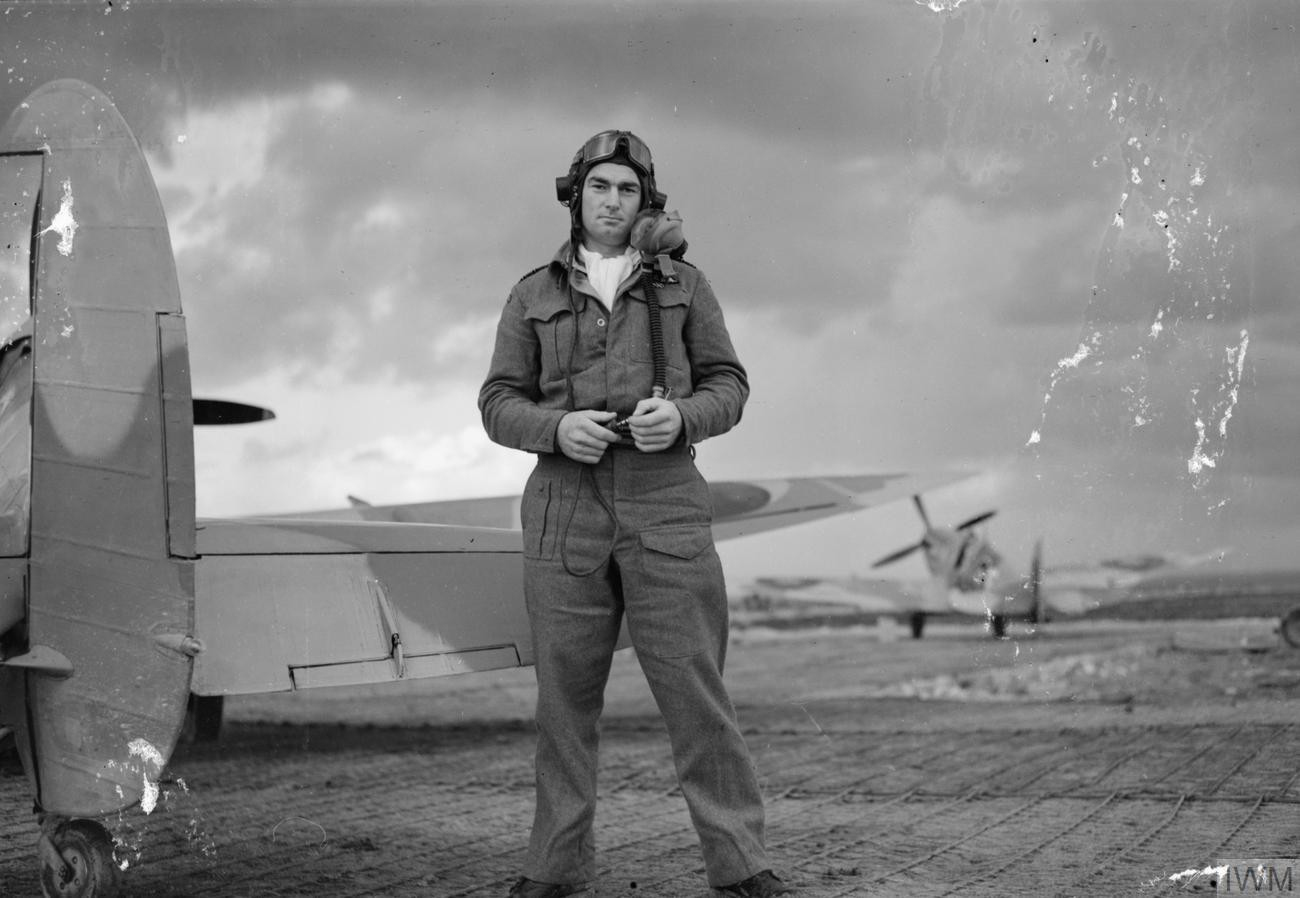
Mackie at Canne, in Italy, while commander of No. 92 Squadron

By this time, the campaign in Tunisia was nearly over and the squadron's focus was targeting transport craft evacuating the Germans and Italians. On 7 May, while on a sweep over the battlefront, he strafed a small vessel. The following day, he shot down a Bf 109 that had just destroyed an aircraft of the RAF. On 13 May, the Axis forces in Tunisia surrendered, ending the fighting in North Africa. On 1 June, Mackie took command of the squadron when Squadron Leader Walker was taken off operations. Later in the month, the squadron moved to Hal Far airfield on Malta as part of No. 324 Wing, which was to support the offensive in Sicily. It began flying operations on 16 June but it otherwise had a quiet month.

Much more intensive flying was completed the following month, as the aerial offensive ramped up in support of Operation Husky: the Allied invasion of Sicily. On 4 July, while escorting Boeing B-17 Flying Fortress bombers attacking the aerodrome at Catania, Mackie destroyed a Bf 109. On the return flight to Malta, isolated from the rest of the squadron, he was harassed by a number of Bf 109s but was able to evade them. The following day, again escorting B-17s but this time to Gerbini, Mackie shot down another Bf 109. The squadron patrolled the landing beaches the day of the invasion of Sicily, 10 July, and the following day escorted P-40 Kittyhawk fighter-bombers to Gerbini airfield; during the return flight to Malta, a pair of Macchi C.202 Folgores were sighted and Mackie damaged one of them.

On 12 July, three MC202s were encountered near Lentini. Mackie pursued one of these, fired on it, and saw it go down in a smoking dive. He claimed this as probably destroyed. The next day, while patrolling over the landing beaches, his flight encountered eight Italian-flown Ju 87s of 121 Gruppo. Mackie shot down two of them, one of five that was claimed as destroyed by his squadron that day, damaged another Ju 87, and on a subsequent patrol destroyed a Reggiane Re.2002 fighter of 5 Stormo. (Note: Mackie claimed the latter as a MC202; the Re.2002 was not commonly seen by Allied fighters and were often misidentified.)

From mid-July, No. 243 Squadron began operating from an airstrip at Comiso, on Sicily. For the next several days, patrols and escort missions were carried. At the end of the month the squadron moved again, this time to Pachino. It carried on with its flying duties and on 8 August Mackie's acting rank was made permanent. The campaign in Sicily ended on 19 August and the squadron began preparing for offensive operations against mainland Italy, moving to Cassala airstrip, on the island's east coast. It flew patrols over the Straits of Messina on 3 and 4 September, the commencement of the Allied invasion of Italy. The following week it covered the landings at Salerno. After unsuccessful engagements with Bf 109s in the preceding days, Mackie destroyed a Dornier Do 217 bomber near Salerno on 11 September. Shortly afterwards the squadron moved to an airstrip 8 miles (13 km) from Salerno. At the end of the month, Mackie was awarded a bar to the DFC he had received earlier in the year.

For much of October, poor weather affected flying but on 15 October, Mackies's last operation with No. 243 Squadron, he damaged a Bf 109 while patrolling above the Volturno River. Shortly afterwards he relinquished his acting squadron leader rank and was transferred away from the squadron to the headquarters of No. 324 Wing; this was as punishment for the inappropriate acquisition of vehicles by squadron personnel. His banishment was brief for in early November, he was posted to command of No. 92 Squadron, part of No. 244 Wing, and operating along the Adriatic coast flying Spitfire Mark VIIIs. For next the few weeks, Mackie's operational flying consisted mainly of patrols along the Sangro River and on one of these, on 3 December, he destroyed a Bf 109 when his section intercepted a dozen German fighters west of Casoli. He shot down another Bf 109 two days later and on 16 December, back near Casoli, damaged a Bf 109.

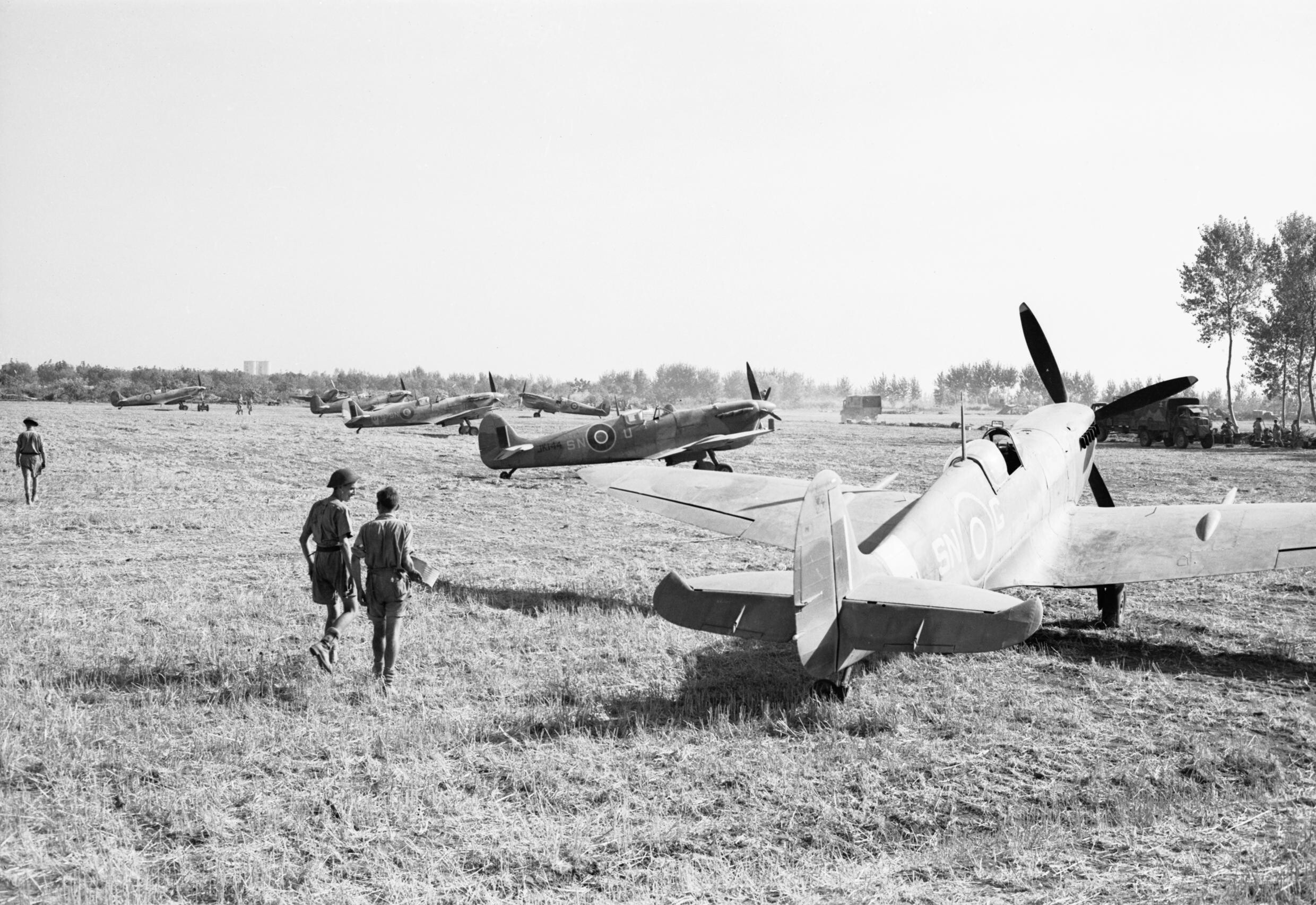
Spitfires of No. 243 Squadron, parked ready for take off at Tusciano from which it provided air cover for the landings at Salerno

In mid-January 1944, No. 92 Squadron moved to an airstrip near Naples in order to provide aerial cover for the forthcoming landings at Anzio. On the day of the landings, 22 January, Mackie flew two patrols and several more over the next few days. During one of these, on 27 January, he damaged a Bf 109 but also received flak damage from gunners on nearby Allied navy ships. He shot down a Fw 190 on 2 February, one of around fifteen that were encountered by the squadron patrolling over Anzio. He flew his final patrol with No. 92 Squadron on 18 February, after which he was taken off flight duties for a rest, returning to England in April. By this time, he had completed 349 sorties and 492 flying hours on operations.

=== Return to Europe ===
On reaching England, Mackie was posted to Bentley Priory, the headquarters of Air Defence of Great Britain, formerly Fighter Command, where he took up a training role. He was responsible for communicating training directives to the various RAF instructing establishments around the country. Although he regularly flew around the country to ensure that the directives were being followed, it was not work that he found fulfilling; he had preferred a role at gunnery school. During this time, he went to Buckingham Palace to be invested with his DFC and bar by King George VI.

On 13 December, Mackie was posted to No. 122 Wing, flying from Volkel in the Netherlands, as a supernumerary squadron leader. He had earlier in the month undergone a conversion course on the Hawker Tempest, with which the wing was equipped. He initially flew with No. 3 Squadron and then No. 274 Squadron. The wing's commander, Group Captain Patrick Jameson, a friend of Mackie's from his days with No. 485 Squadron, wanted him to gain operational experience on the Tempest before Mackie could be assigned a squadron command. As well as carrying attacks on ground targets, the squadrons of No. 122 Wing also performed patrols to maintain air superiority. On Christmas Eve, Mackie shot down an Fw 190 over the Malmedy area; the pilot was most likely the German flying ace Wolfgang Kosse. Three days later, he damaged a Bf 109 over Aachen.

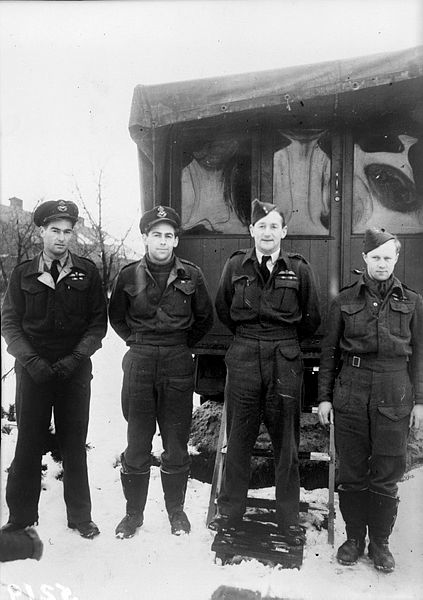
Mackie stands on first left alongside fellow squadron commanders of No. 122 Wing; Keith Thiele (second left), commander of No. 3 Squadron, and A.E. 'Spike' Umbers (first right), commander of No. 486 Squadron; the wing commander, Patrick Jameson stands second right

On 1 January 1945, the Luftwaffe launched Operation Bodenplatte, a coordinated strike against the Allied airfields in the Low Countries. Mackie was sitting in his Tempest, waiting to take off, when the Volkel airfield was attacked by low flying fighters. Despite the airfield being strafed, Mackie was not injured. Most of No. 122 Wing were already in the air and were largely unscathed by the attack.

Two weeks later, Mackie was given command of No. 80 Squadron, also at Volkel. He replaced another New Zealander, Robert Spurdle, who had flown continuously for six months and was exhausted. Over the next several weeks Mackie flew extensively, destroying a number of locomotives and motor vehicles; he also shot down a Bf 109 on 23 January. On one raid, carried out on 2 February, the engine of his aircraft was damaged and he had to nurse it back to Volkel, around 150 miles (240 km) away, where he crashlanded. Uninjured, Mackie flew the next day, leading a sortie of eight Tempests in attacking two trains laden with trucks. He shot down a Fw 190 in a difficult dogfight near Hanover on 7 March, later describing his opponent as a "real cracker".

No. 80 Squadron flew in support of the crossing of the Rhine on 23 March, protecting the bridgehead, and two days later resumed its regular ground attack duties. From 26 to 31 March, Mackie flew eight sorties, destroying or damaging a number of trains and vehicles. On 6 April, he was informed that he was to be awarded the Distinguished Service Order (DSO). This was formally announced on 8 May in The London Gazette, the published citation reading:

This officer has led the squadron on numerous sorties within recent months. During these operations more than 70 locomotives have been put out of action. A good number of barges, trucks and mechanical vehicles have also been most effectively attacked. Ten enemy aircraft have been destroyed. The successes obtained are a fine testimony to this officer's exceptional leadership, great skill and courage. Among his achievements is the destruction of 18 enemy aircraft.

— London Gazette, No. 37070, 8 May 1945.

On 9 April, Mackie was credited with two of three Arado Ar 96 trainers that were destroyed when No. 80 Squadron caught a number of them circling over Fassberg airfield. (Note: At the time Mackie claimed these as Messerschmitt Bf 108s; it was not until much later that they were identified from gun camera footage as being Ar 96s.) Two days later, the squadron moved to Hopsten in Germany and were flying from there beginning 12 April. With the German military in full retreat, there were a number of vehicles that were targets for the Tempests. The Luftwaffe still retained a limited presence in the air; on 15 April he shared in the destruction of a Fw 190 with his wingman. This was Mackie's final aerial victory.

No. 80 Squadron returned to the United Kingdom on 18 April to undergo training in using their Tempests as fighter-bombers. While there, Mackie was promoted to wing commander and offered the choice of two new commands; the first was as wing commander (flying) at No. 122 Wing, the incumbent having been killed earlier in the month, or as commander of No. 616 Squadron, the first RAF squadron to be equipped with the Gloster Meteor jet fighter. He chose the former and took up his new appointment on 2 May; (Note: Command of No. 616 Squadron went to another New Zealander, Warren Schrader.) he was immediately on flying duties, performing a reconnaissance flight in the Eutin area. The next day his aircraft was damaged by shrapnel from an exploding locomotive that he attacked but he was able to make a safe landing. Switching to another aircraft, Mackie flew another sortie the same day to Schwerin, seeking out German aircraft with No. 3 Squadron. The sweep resulted in fourteen aircraft of the Luftwaffe being destroyed in the air and on the ground; Mackie was responsible for three of those on the ground. On 4 May Mackie led a similar sortie, this time with No. 486 Squadron, over the Kiel-Haderslev area, and they claimed three Fieseler Fi 156 aircraft destroyed on the ground. Mackie shared in the destruction of one of these.

The war in Europe ended on 5 May, with Mackie having flown a total of 433 sorties. He achieved twenty aerial victories, as well as three shared kills, two probables, ten damaged and one shared damaged, with three destroyed and two shared destroyed on the ground during the war. Of this final total, twelve victories, three shared destroyed, two probably destroyed, seven damaged and one shared damaged, was achieved while flying the Spitfire Mark V and Mark VIII. Mackie was also credited with five and one shared victories in the Hawker Tempest. He was the most successful flying ace to serve with the RNZAF. (Note: He was not the most successful New Zealand flying ace of the Second World War; this was Colin Gray, who served with the RAF and achieved 27 aerial victories.)

== Postwar period ==
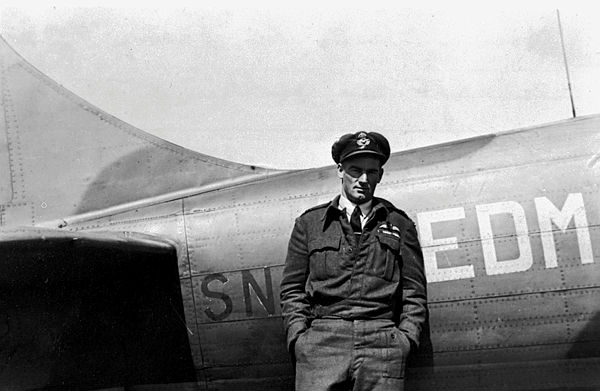
Evan Mackie and his Hawker Tempest, which bears the code EDM, his initials

No. 122 Wing was now based at Fassberg and remained there into June. It flew regularly, practicing formation flying for ceremonial flypasts. Mackie spent some time in the south of France on leave before leading No. 122 Wing to Denmark on 22 June, where it was to be based at Kastrup. At the end of the month, he was awarded the American Distinguished Flying Cross in "recognition of valuable services rendered in connection with the war". This was most likely in relation to the aerial support he gave American forces during the Battle of the Bulge in late 1944. He was personally presented with the award by Major General Otto Weyland, the commander of the United States XIX Tactical Air Command, on 26 July. After several weeks in Denmark, No. 122 Wing returned to Germany and it was disbanded there on 17 September.

Mackie, after a period of leave, was posted on 1 October to No. 83 Group Control Centre in Schleswig. Here he was in charge of the various radar installations of the group. His enthusiasm for flying waned and in November he made his last flights as a pilot. He returned to England in February 1946, where he married Marjorie née Dear at Garston. He then took up a posting with the British Air Forces of Occupation. This only lasted a month before he then proceeded to the RAF Staff College at Bracknell, attending No. 34 Staff Course as a representative of the RNZAF. The course was completed at the end of October but by this time, he had decided that he did not wish to pursue a career in the RNZAF.

== Later life ==
Mackie and his wife returned home to New Zealand aboard the Rangitiki in December. Offered a permanent commission in the RNZAF, he declined and was discharged in January 1947 although he remained in the reserve of officers. He resumed his career as an electrician, working at the Waitomo Electric Power Board. He eventually became Chief Inspector for the Tauranga Power Board, retiring in 1978. He died of cancer in Tauranga on 28 April 1986, survived by his wife and two sons.

== Bibliography ==
- Avery, Max; Shores, Christopher (1997). Spitfire Leader: The Story of Wing CDR Evan "Rosie" Mackie, DSO, DFC and Bar, DFC (US), Top Scoring RNZAF Fighter Ace. London: Grub Street. ISBN 1-898697-58-2.
- Cull, Brian; Malizia, Nicola; Galea, Frederick (2000). Spitfires Over Sicily: The Crucial Role of the Malta Spitfires in the Battle of Sicily, January–August 1943. London: Grub Street. ISBN 1-902304-32-2.
- McGibbon, Ian, ed. (2000). The Oxford Companion to New Zealand Military History. Auckland, New Zealand: Oxford University Press. ISBN 978-0-19-558376-2.
- Shores, Christopher; Williams, Clive (1994). Aces High: A Tribute to the Most Notable Fighter Pilots of the British and Commonwealth Forces in WWII. London, United Kingdom: Grub Street. ISBN 1-898697-00-0.
- Spick, Mike (1997). Allied Fighter Aces: The Air Combat Tactics and Techniques of World War II. London: Greenhill Books. ISBN 1-85367-282-3.
- Thompson, H. L. (1953). New Zealanders with the Royal Air Force. Official History of New Zealand in the Second World War 1939–45. Vol. I. Wellington: War History Branch. OCLC 270919916.
- Wells, Kevin W. (1984). An Illustrated History of the New Zealand Spitfire Squadron. Auckland, New Zealand: Hutchinson Group. ISBN 0-09-159360-3.
