= Bill Crawford-Compton =

Royal Air Force air marshal (1915–1988)

William Vernon Crawford-Compton
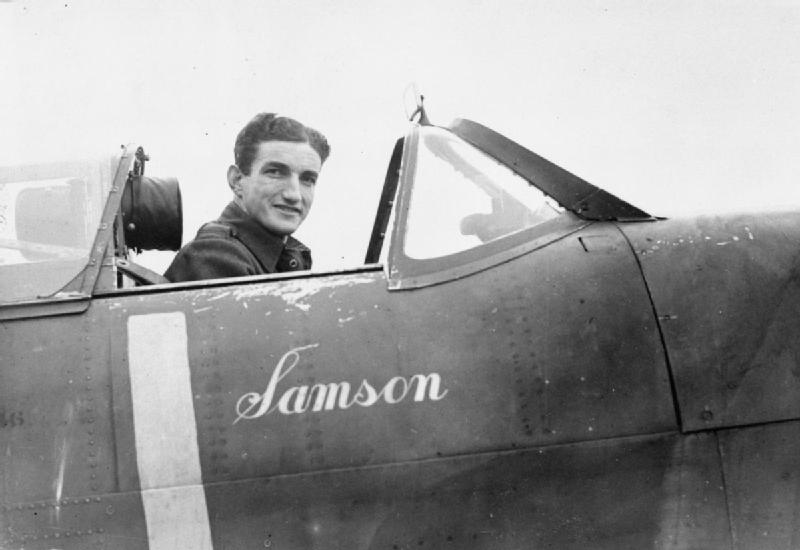
- Crawford-Compton in the cockpit of his Spitfire, 1942
- Born: 2 March 1915; Invercargill, New Zealand
- Died: 2 January 1988 (aged 72); England
- Military career
- Allegiance: New Zealand, United Kingdom
- Branch: Royal Air Force
- Service years: 1939–1968
- Rank: Air Vice-Marshal
- Commands: No. 22 Group RAF (1966–68); RAF Gamil (1956–59); RAF Bruggen (1953–56); No. 145 Wing RAF (1944–45); No. 64 Squadron RAF (1942–43)
- Conflicts: Second World War; Circus offensive; Channel Dash; Dieppe Raid; Operation Overlord; Cold War; Suez Crisis
- Awards: Companion of the Order of the Bath; Commander of the Order of the British Empire; Distinguished Service Order & Bar; Distinguished Flying Cross & Bar; Silver Star (United States)

William Vernon Crawford-Compton (2 March 1915 – 2 January 1988) was a New Zealand flying ace of the Royal Air Force (RAF) during the Second World War. He was officially credited with destroying at least 20 German aircraft.

Born in Invercargill, Crawford-Compton joined the RAF in 1939. He qualified as a pilot the following year and was posted to No. 603 Squadron. In March 1941, he was transferred to a newly formed unit, No. 485 Squadron. He flew numerous operations, including during the Channel Dash, and was credited with the shooting down of a number of aircraft. After recovering from injuries received in a crash landing, he served as a flight commander in No. 611 Squadron. He was given command of No. 64 Squadron at the end of 1942 and led it for the early part of the following year. After a period of staff duties, he became wing leader of the Hornchurch fighter wing in mid-1943, and led it until the end of the year. He spent three months in the United States giving lectures on RAF operations before returning to active duty as commander of No. 145 Wing. He led the wing in offensive operations in France in the run up to and after Operation Overlord. After the war, he held a series of senior appointments in the RAF, including command of an airfield in Egypt during the Suez Crisis. His final posting before his retirement in late 1968 was commander of No. 22 Group. He died in January 1988 at the age of 72.

== Early life ==
William Vernon Crawford-Compton was born in Invercargill, New Zealand, on 2 March 1915, the son of William Gilbert Crawford-Compton and Ethel (née Horne). The family later moved to Auckland, settling in Mission Bay. In 1938, he was working as a storeman in Waiuku when he decided to enlist in the Royal Air Force (RAF). He joined the crew of a ketch, with the intention of sailing to England where he would enlist in the RAF.

The yacht, Land's End, left Auckland and began sailing through the South Pacific. After stops in Tonga and Fiji, as they neared New Guinea, Land's End struck an uncharted reef. The four crew built a raft and were able to make it to nearby Rossel Island. They stayed with a local tribe for a time before making their way to Samari in New Guinea. There Crawford-Compton gained a berth as a carpenter on a steamer heading for England. He eventually arrived at Liverpool on 6 September 1939 just as the Second World War commenced. He promptly joined the RAF as an aircraftman.

== Second World War ==
Although Crawford-Compton enlisted in the RAF in a groundcrew role, he was later selected for flight training. Once this was completed, towards the end of 1940, he was posted to No. 603 Squadron, based at Hornchurch, as a sergeant pilot. In March 1941 he was transferred to No. 485 Squadron. His new unit, newly formed at Driffield, had a cadre of experienced New Zealand pilots. After a period of training, the squadron became operational on 12 April, flying Supermarine Spitfire fighters on patrols over the North Sea.

=== Circus offensive ===
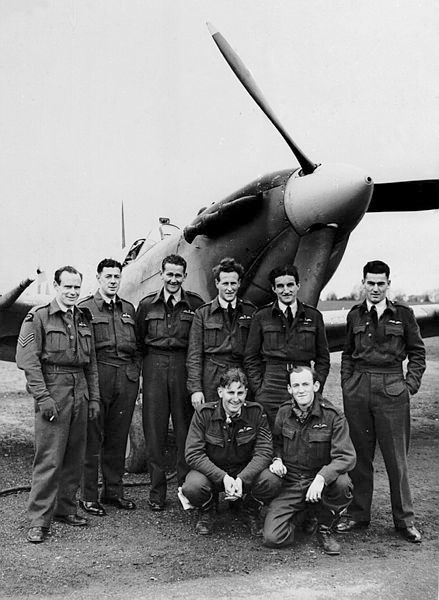
Crawford-Compton stands second right among a group of No. 485 Squadron pilots, 1942. Fellow flying aces Evan Mackie stands first right while Jack Rae stands first left

In June No. 485 Squadron graduated to taking part in the RAF's Circus offensive, carrying out sweeps over the French coast and the following month was operating from Redhill. By this time Crawford-Compton had been commissioned in the Royal Air Force Volunteer Reserve (RAFVR) and was a probationary pilot officer. Redhill was a satellite airfield to Kenley and the squadron formed part of Kenley Wing, alongside No. 452 and No. 602 Squadrons. It flew 22 offensive operations in July during which seven pilots were lost. By September the tempo of operations had slowed, with the squadron only involved in seven operations. During one of these, on 21 September, Crawford-Compton engaged a Messerschmitt Bf 109 fighter, claiming it as probably destroyed. The following month, while covering bombers attacking St. Omer on 13 October, he destroyed a Bf 109, stating that he had seen it break up in midair. As winter set in, offensive operations were scaled back but on one of the final sweeps of year, carried out on 6 November, he claimed another Bf 109 as probably destroyed near Cap Gris-Nez.

On 12 February 1942, No. 485 Squadron was among those scrambled during the Channel Dash, with Crawford-Compton leading one of its flights. He shot down one Bf 109, which crashed near Ostend and damaged a second. Now holding the rank of acting flight lieutenant, he was awarded the Distinguished Flying Cross (DFC) early the following month; the citation, published in The London Gazette, read:

This officer has participated in a large number of operational sorties. He has at all times displayed great dash and determination. He has destroyed 2 and probably destroyed another 2 enemy aircraft.

— London Gazette, No. 35483, 10 March 1942.

The Kenley Wing resumed offensive operations the next month and on 26 March, while escorting Douglas Boston bombers attacking Le Havre, the squadron encountered large numbers of Bf 109s. Crawford-Compton, leading the squadron on this operation, shot down one of the enemy fighters during the engagement, and with Pilot Officer Evan Mackie, shared in the destruction of another. Two days later he shot down a Focke-Wulf Fw 190 fighter, one of several put up by the Luftwaffe in response to a sweep mounted by the RAF that covered the French coast from Cap Gris-Nez to Dunkirk.

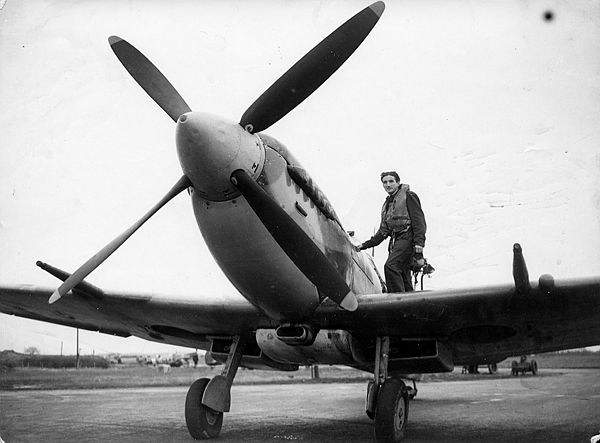
Crawford-Compton standing on the wing of his Spitfire, 1942

On 27 April, Crawford-Compton was involved in an accident when the engine of his Spitfire cut out while landing after an operation. During the resulting crash landing, he broke his wrist. This took him off flight operations for a time while he recovered and meant he missed being given command of No. 485 Squadron, for its commander, Squadron Leader Edward Wells, was to be appointed to lead Kenley Wing. In August, once he recovered from his injuries, he was posted to No. 611 Squadron, another Spitfire unit, as one of its flight leaders. He soon was back in action, and damaged a Fw 190 on 19 August while flying one of two covering patrols he carried out during the Dieppe Raid. On the other patrol, he became separated from his section and was pursued by four Fw 190s, which only ceased the chase halfway across the English Channel. Five days later, he destroyed another Fw 190. He claimed to have shot down two more on 28 August, when his squadron was escorting Boeing B-17 Flying Fortresses of the United States Army Air Force (USAAF) on a bombing raid of an aircraft factory at Méaulte, near Amiens. On subsequent operations from September to early November, he was credited with damaging at least six Fw 190s. On 9 November he claimed a Fw 190 as destroyed near Cap Gris-Nez. A further Fw 190 was claimed as probably shot down south of Dunkirk on 6 December.

Crawford-Compton was appointed commander of the Spitfire-equipped No. 64 Squadron on Christmas Day. By this time he had been awarded a Bar to his DFC; the published citation read:

This officer has led his flight on many operational sorties with great skill and success. Since being awarded the Distinguished Flying Cross he has destroyed a further 5 enemy aircraft bringing his total victories to seven.

— London Gazette, No. 35819, 11 December 1942.

Crawford-Compton was credited with damaging a Fw 190 on 20 January 1943 and damaged another one the following month. On 8 March he had two Fw 190s confirmed as destroyed near Clères. He gave up command of No. 64 Squadron shortly afterwards, at which time he was assigned a staff role at No. 11 Group. Despite his duties, he still occasionally flew on operations, and on 13 March, while flying with No. 122 Squadron was credited with damaging a Bf 109. In June he was appointed commander of the fighter wing at Hornchurch, which included No. 129 and No. 222 Squadrons. Much of the wing's work involved escorting bombers of the USAAF on raids to France. In recognition of these efforts, he was awarded the Silver Star, a United States gallantry medal. He destroyed a Bf 109 on 27 June. Another Bf 109 was destroyed on 19 August and this was followed by Fw 190s on 5 and 23 September. Shortly afterwards, his award of the Distinguished Service Order (DSO) was announced, the published citation reading:

Since being awarded a bar to the Distinguished Flying Cross, this officer has taken part in a large number of sorties over enemy territory. By his masterly leadership and exceptional skill and gallant example he has imbued the squadron he commands with rare efficiency with a rare zest for battle, combined with a high degree of operational efficiency. Wing Commander Crawford-Compton, who has destroyed at least 13 hostile aircraft and damaged several others, has rendered most valuable service.

— London Gazette, No. 36183, 24 September 1943.

Within a few days of the announcement of his DSO, he was credited with damaging a Fw 190 near Beauvais and then on 3 October, the destruction of a Bf 109 near Noordwijk. His substantive rank was made up to squadron leader later that month. At the end of the year, Crawford-Compton was taken off active duties and selected to go to the United States to give talks regarding the operations of the RAF. Along with another experienced pilot, Wing Commander Raymond Harries, he spent three months in the country lecturing before returning to England.

=== Northwest Europe ===
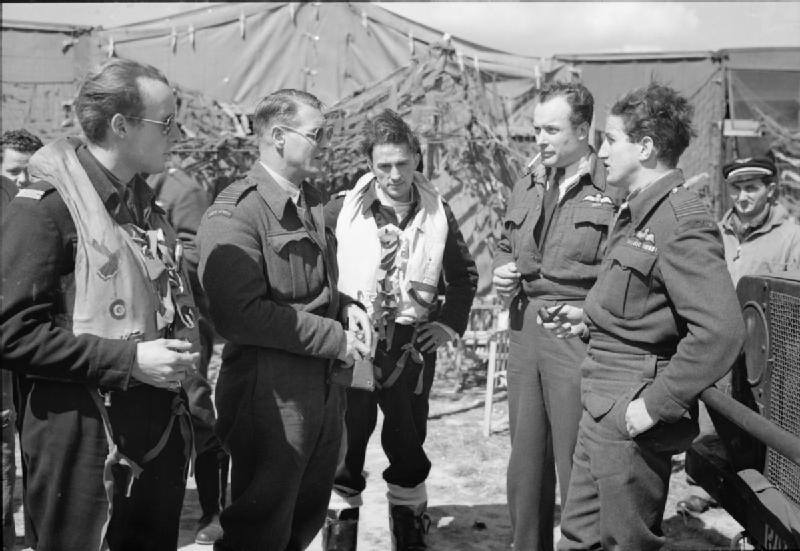
Crawford-Compton stands on the right in profile, talking to Group Captain Adolph Malan at Merston, Sussex, on the morning of D-Day

In April 1944, Crawford-Compton was appointed wing commander, flying, of No. 145 Wing, which had two Free French squadrons of Spitfires. Under the overall command of Wing Commander Alan Deere, and later Group Captain Adolph Malan, the wing was part of the Second Tactical Air Force. In the prelude to Operation Overlord, the landings at Normandy, Crawford-Compton led the wing in attacks on targets in France, including transportation infrastructure, flying-bomb sites and military installations in the Pas-de-Calais.

Following the invasion, Crawford-Compton's wing conducted regular patrols over Normandy and covering the Allied forces maintaining their hold on the bridgehead. The day after the landings, he intercepted and destroyed a Junkers Ju 88 medium bomber, one of a group of five that were attacking the landing beaches. As the Allied ground forces moved inland, the wing began operating from temporary airstrips established in the bridgehead at Normandy. It sought out and attacked German transports on the roads between Paris and Caen, disrupting the flow of supplies to the front lines. At the end of the month, he destroyed a Bf 109 and Fw 190 that had just taken off from Evereux airfield, with other pilots in the wing accounting for four other German aircraft.

As the Allies advanced further into Normandy, No. 145 Wing continued to provide support, carrying out fighter-bomber operations on the Falaise pocket and on 9 July, Crawford-Compton destroyed a Bf 109. By the end of the year, his command was operating from Antwerp. Upon completion of his tour in early 1945, he was awarded a Bar to his DSO and was posted to the headquarters of No. 11 Group, as a staff officer. He ended the war having flown at least 517 operational missions and was credited with destroying at least 20, possibly 21, German aircraft. He also shared in the destruction of one further aircraft, claimed three probables and a share in a fourth, and thirteen damaged.

== Later life ==
In the postwar period, Crawford-Compton went to the RAF's Staff College after which he formally transferred from the RAFVR to the regular RAF. He was granted a permanent commission as a squadron leader with effect from 1 September 1945 although remained in his acting wing commander rank. After a period of service at the headquarters of Middle East Command in Cairo, he served as a time as the Air attache in Oslo, Norway. He then went on to command the RAF station at Bruggen in West Germany. In January 1955, he was promoted to group captain.

During the Suez Crisis, he was commander of Gamil airfield in Egypt and for his services, in the Queen's Birthday Honours the following year, Crawford-Compton was appointed a Commander of the Order of the British Empire. In July 1960, his acting rank of air commodore was made permanent. Three years later he was promoted to air vice-marshal, having already held the rank in an acting capacity for a month.

In the 1965 New Year Honours Crawford-Compton was appointed a Companion of the Order of the Bath. He was the senior air staff officer in the Near East Air Force, based at Cyprus, until December 1965. He then succeeded Air Vice-Marshal Albert Case in January 1966 as commander of No. 22 Group, part of the RAF's Technical Training Command. This was Crawford-Compton's last appointment for he retired from the RAF in November 1968. He died in England on 2 January 1988.

== Notes ==
Military offices
Preceded by Albert Case	Air Officer Commanding No. 22 Group; 1966–1968	Succeeded by Graham Magill
