= Keith Thiele =

WW2 RNZAF officer (1921-2016)

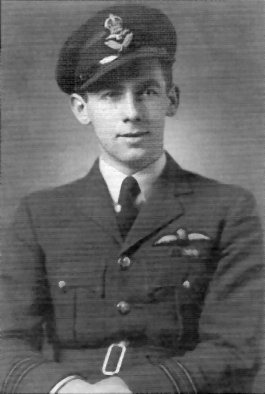
- Keith Frederick Thiele c. 1941
- Born: 25 February 1921; Christchurch, New Zealand
- Died: 5 January 2016 (aged 94); Sydney, Australia
- Military career
- Allegiance: New Zealand
- Branch: Royal New Zealand Air Force
- Service years: 1940–1946
- Rank: Squadron Leader
- Nickname: Jimmy
- Units: No. 3 Squadron RAF; No. 41 Squadron RAF; No. 405 Squadron RCAF; No. 467 Squadron RAAF; No. 486 Squadron RNZAF
- Commands: No. 3 Squadron RAF
- Conflicts: Second World War
- Awards: Distinguished Service Order; Distinguished Flying Cross & Two Bars

Keith Frederick (Jimmy) Thiele, DSO, DFC & Two Bars (25 February 1921 – 5 January 2016) was an officer of the Royal New Zealand Air Force (RNZAF) during the Second World War. He was one of only four New Zealand-born airmen to receive two medal Bars to his Distinguished Flying Cross.

== Early life ==
Thiele was born in Christchurch, New Zealand on 25 February 1921. He was educated at Waltham Primary and Christchurch Boys' High Schools. Thiele was working as a junior reporter at the Christchurch Star-Sun newspaper when war was declared in September 1939. He was 19 when he joined the Royal New Zealand Air Force (RNZAF) in December 1940.

== Second World War ==
After completing the pilot training course in RNZAF Station Harewood in April 1941 with the rank of pilot officer, Thiele was sent to England in June 1941 where he was seconded to the Royal Air Force. On a train from Liverpool, Thiele spotted his first Supermarine Spitfire fighters and was convinced they were for him. At the reception centre later that evening he was asked to declare his flying preference and he wrote "fighters", but was posted to RAF Bomber Command.

=== Bomber Command ===
Thiele was posted to an operational training unit before being transferred to the Canadian No. 405 Squadron at RAF Pocklington a few miles east of York, equipped with Vickers Wellington II medium bombers. Thiele's first mission was almost his last. Returning from Cherbourg in France in January 1942, Thiele got the green light to land, but as he touched down was confronted by another aircraft. The two planes collided engine to engine, ripping the wings off. The court of inquiry absolved him. Thiele flew 21 sorties in Wellingtons before the squadron converted to Handley Page Halifax medium bomber and on 30–31 May 1941, flying one of these, Thiele took part in the thousand-bomber raid on Cologne. There followed a number of missions over Essen amidst very heavy flak and German searchlight exposure. Thiele was promoted straight from pilot officer to flight lieutenant, skipping the intermediate rank of flying officer, and then to squadron leader in the space of a few months.

Thiele was awarded the Distinguished Flying Cross (DFC) in August 1942. His citation in part read: "he has shown great skill and has pressed home his attacks regardless of opposition. A fine leader and a courageous flight commander, this officer has set a most praiseworthy example". He completed a tour of operations in September, having completed 32 sorties. He was rested and sent to an Operational Training Unit to serve as an instructor but quickly found this duty unsatisfactory. He dropped a rank, back to flight lieutenant, in order to return to operations. After converting to the Avro Lancaster heavy bomber, Thiele was posted to the Australian No. 467 Squadron. He took severe risks and displayed leadership, tending to a sick comrade on one flight, and on another mission to Berlin flying low enough to knock out Nazi searchlights and anti-aircraft. In March 1943, Bomber Command ordered an attack on Nuremberg into the heart of the Third Reich.

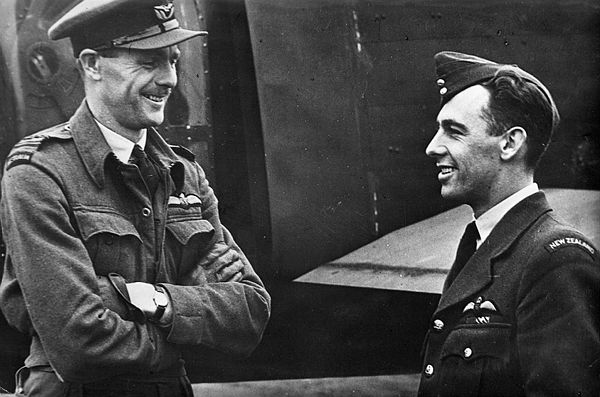
Thiele, on the right, with Squadron Leader Sinclair of No. 467 Squadron, June 1943

It was flying a Lancaster that Thiele completed 20 more missions and, in May 1943, he was awarded the Distinguished Service Order for displaying outstanding courage, keenness and determination during operations. On 12 May, Thiele was flying a Lancaster of No. 467 Squadron on a mission to Duisburg, an industrial city. He had nearly reached the target when his aircraft was hit by a flak underneath the fuselage, which severed the rear half of the starboard outer engine, punctured the starboard inner engine and blew out most of the perspex in the cockpit. Thiele, dazed by a blow from a shell splinter that had struck him on the side of the head, limped the aircraft back from Duisburg on two engines. Shortly after crossing the English coast he was unable to maintain height, but displaying superb airmanship he struggled on and succeeded in effecting a crashlanding at an airfield in Norfolk. For this feat, Thiele was awarded a Bar to his DFC, the citation praising his "courage, skill and determination of a high order."

In mid 1943, Thiele declined a posting to No. 617 Squadron under the command of Guy Gibson, the man who had led that squadron on the May 1943 Dambusters raid that blew up the Ruhr dams. A few weeks after the raid, Thiele received a message that Gibson wanted to see him at RAF Scampton, in Lincolnshire. Thiele, with 50 operations behind him, told Gibson that he had had his fill of bombers and was desperate to fulfil his ambition to fly Spitfires. He informed Gibson that he did not want to appear ungrateful but disclosed he already had the wheels rolling to go to a unit flying experimental Spitfires as a step out of Bomber Command. Thiele believed that he had been picked out by Ralph Cochrane of Group Headquarters as a likely successor to Gibson, a position that would eventually go to Squadron Leader George Holden. Thiele's decision not to join No. 617 Squadron proved the right decision. On the night of 15–16 September 1943, 5 of the 12 Lancasters were lost during a mission to bomb on the Dortmund-Ems Canal, including Holden's, which was shot down by flak with no survivors.

=== Fighter Command ===
Thiele was posted to a transport squadron and then almost immediately to the trans-Atlantic Ferry Command to fly Canadian-built Lancasters to England. He spent three months in Canada before flying one of the first Lancasters to England. He was trained by a Spitfire conversion unit in December 1943. In February 1944, Thiele transferred to RAF Fighter Command and was posted to No. 41 Squadron based in the south of England. He flew Spitfires XIIs from Tangmere with No. 41 Squadron, flying cross-channel support missions in support of the June D-Day landings on the Normandy coast. He was one of the experienced pilots sent to destroy V1-flying bombs destined for London. As the campaign opened he had been delegated to shore patrols along the Kent coast and the Narrow Seas in defence of coastal shipping, victims of sabotage attacks from occupied France.

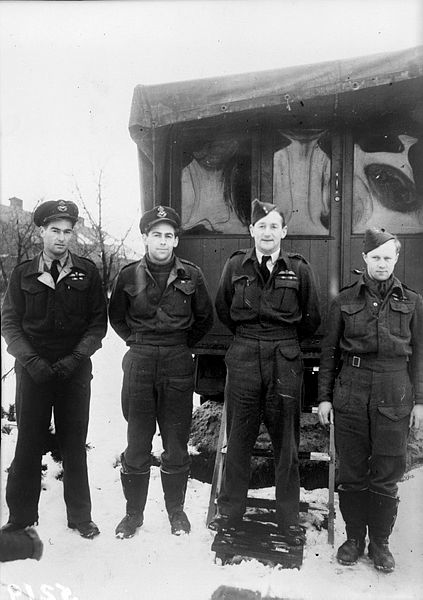
Thiele stands second left with fellow squadron commanders of No. 122 Wing, Evan Mackie (first left), of No. 80 Squadron, and Arthur Umbers (first right), of No. 486 Squadron; Patrick Jameson, commander of the wing, stands third left

Later promoted to flight command, Thiele joined No. 486 (NZ) Squadron in October 1944 to pilot Hawker Typhoon fighters from Volkel, the Netherlands, on which he completed 50 operations. He then joined No. 3 Squadron, in the same wing, flying Napier-Sabre powered Hawker Tempest V fighters, becoming the squadron's commanding officer in January 1945. By this time, Thiele had flown around 150 sorties in Spitfires and Tempests, gaining two confirmed transport aircraft "kills", damaged 14 locomotives, many barges and motor transports. (Note: Research has not yet provided an exact calculation as to the grand total of enemy planes that Thiele actually shot down.) On 24 December 1944, Thiele claimed a Messerschmitt 109 shot down, when, with another Tempest, he attacked a formation of 10 Messerschmitt 109s over Malmedy. On 29 December, leading a section of four Tempests on armed reconnaissance, he was involved in a low-level dogfight with an estimated 40 Me 109s and FW190s. Thiele claimed one Me109G destroyed, having seen the enemy pilot bail out.

=== Prisoner of war ===
On 10 February 1945, Thiele led a formation of eight Tempests to attack locomotives in the Paderborn-Rheine area. Thiele and another pilot were shot down by enemy anti-aircraft fire, Thiele being seen to bail out of his burning aircraft near Doorsten. He was officially reported as missing in action. Slightly wounded, Thiele was taken captive by the flak crew that had shot him down and, following interrogation, he was sent to a prisoner of war (POW) camp at Dulag Luft near Wetzlar.

On 31 March 1945, after the POW camp was liberated but before any transport or Allied forces arrived, Thiele and a Canadian airman stole bicycles and then a motorcycle, and he got back to his base five weeks before the end of the war in Europe. In May 1945, Thiele was awarded a second Bar to his DFC for displaying "the highest qualities of skill, together with great bravery and iron determination. His example has inspired all". He was one of four New Zealanders to have been awarded the DFC three times. Thiele relinquished his commission on 5 December 1946.

== Post war and later life ==
After the war, Thiele returned to New Zealand, where he commenced a career as a journalist. Dissatisfied, he moved to Sydney, Australia, and for many years flew as a senior captain for Qantas. Thiele was a member of the Caterpillar Club, an informal association of people who had successfully used a parachute to bail out of a disabled aircraft. He was the captain of the inaugural jet service from Brisbane to London in October 1959, flying the Sydney to Singapore leg of the trip in the Boeing 707. An avid adventurer, twice during sailing excursions on the notorious Tasman Sea, Thiele had his tiny yacht (named Spitfire) smashed by mountainous waves, yet he managed to sail home. Thiele later built and operated a marina in Sydney and sailed his own yacht across the Tasman Sea to see New Zealand's first America's Cup defence when he was 80. In 2005, he sold his medals at auction. In later life, Thiele retired to the Queensland town of Bundaberg. He died in Sydney on 5 January 2016, at the age of 94. He was survived by a daughter.

== Bibliography ==
- Mitchell, Alan (1945). New Zealanders in the air war. G.G. Harrap & co. ltd. OCLC 464230856.
- Hancock, Kenneth (1946). New Zealand at war. Wellington, NZ: A. H. & A. W. Reed. OCLC 153784576.
- Hanson, C. M. (2001). By Such Deeds: Honours and Awards in the Royal New Zealand Air Force 1923–1999. Christchurch: Volplane Press. ISBN 0-473-07301-3.
- Obituaries (28 January 2016). "Squadron Leader Keith Thiele DSO, DFC and bar". The Daily Telegraph.
