= Bert Wipiti =

Bert Sam Wipiti
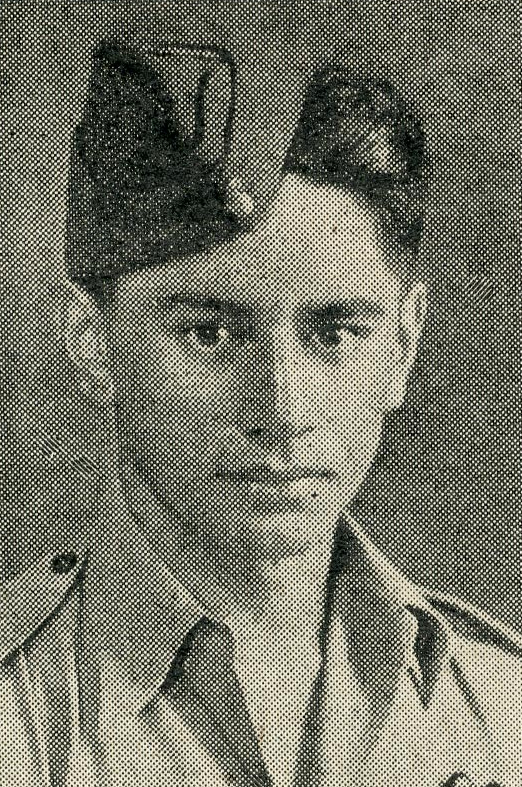
- Born: 16 January 1922; New Plymouth, New Zealand
- Died: 3 October 1943 (aged 21)
- Military career
- Allegiance: New Zealand
- Branch: Royal New Zealand Air Force
- Service years: 1941–1943 †
- Rank: Warrant Officer
- Units: No. 243 Squadron RAF; No. 485 Squadron RNZAF
- Conflicts: Second World War
- Awards: Distinguished Flying Medal

Bert Sam Wipiti, DFM (16 January 1922 – 3 October 1943) was a New Zealand fighter pilot and flying ace of the Second World War. Born in New Plymouth, he enlisted in the Royal New Zealand Air Force (RNZAF) in 1941 and when he was posted to No. 243 Squadron in Singapore, he was the first Māori airman to leave New Zealand for active duty. Following the Japanese invasion of British Malaya, he destroyed five Japanese aircraft before being evacuated to Java in February 1942. He later flew with the RNZAF's No. 485 Squadron in Europe and was killed on operations while escorting bombers on a raid over France.

== Early life ==
Bert Sam Wipiti, also known as Herbert Samuel Wipiti, was born on 16 January 1922 in New Plymouth, in the North Island of New Zealand. The son of Motu Tamihana Wipiti and his wife Ngamata née Lowrie, Wipiti was of Māori descent and was educated at Mangorei School and New Plymouth Boys' High School.

== Second World War ==
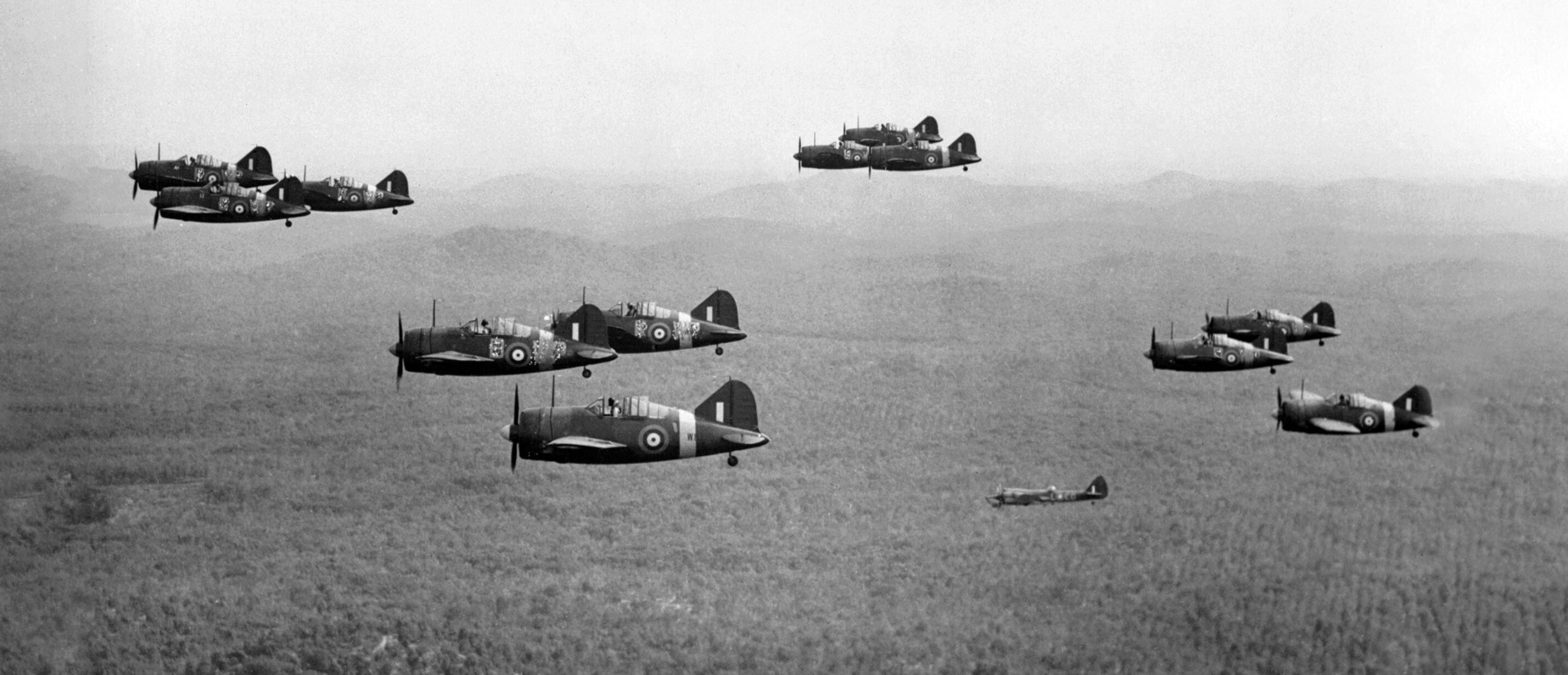
A flight of Brewster Buffaloes from No. 243 Squadron over Malaya

A refrigeration serviceman at the time of his enlistment, Wipiti joined the Royal New Zealand Air Force (RNZAF) in January 1941. He completed flight training at Ohakea, gained his flying badge in late May, and then proceeded to Malaya as a sergeant pilot in July. He was the first Māori airman to go overseas for service.

=== Singapore ===
On his arrival in Singapore in August, Wipiti was posted to the Royal Air Force's No. 243 Squadron, which was based at Kallang Airport and operated the outclassed Brewster Buffalo fighter. Once the Japanese invaded British Malaya on 8 December 1941, he was part of a small detachment from No. 243 Squadron to briefly operate with an Australian squadron, No. 21 Squadron, flying from Ipoh, and returning to Singapore on 14 December.

On 10 January 1942, Wipiti was credited with helping shoot down a Mitsubishi Ki-46 reconnaissance aircraft, over Singapore. This was reportedly the first Japanese aircraft shot down in the Battle of Singapore. On 21 January, while on a patrol over the Batu Pahat area, he shot down a Mitsubishi A6M Zero fighter and then, the following day, destroyed two Mitsubishi G3M bombers that were part of a raid on No. 243 Squadron's airfield. A few days later, flying escort to several Vickers Vildebeest bombers that were attacking a Japanese transport convoy, he shot down another Ki-46. By the end of January, Wipiti's squadron had been disbanded and he was one of a few sergeants that were attached to No. 453 Squadron, an Australian squadron based at Seletar, which also received the remaining serviceable Buffalo aircraft.

Shortly before the fall of Singapore, Wipiti was evacuated to Java, surviving the sinking of his original transport ship. In late March 1942 he was awarded the Distinguished Flying Medal (DFM) in recognition of his service in Malaya and Singapore, having shot down five Japanese aircraft. The citation for his DFM, published in the London Gazette, read:

Sergeant Wipiti has carried out a large number of operational flights and he has displayed outstanding courage and determination whilst engaging large formations of enemy aircraft. He has set a fine example to all.

— London Gazette, No. 35502, 27 March 1942

Wipiti was sent to India, where he was posted to No. 67 Squadron, flying Hawker Hurricane fighters. While stationed in India, he encountered racism from the British and after several months, was posted to England in August 1943.

=== Europe ===
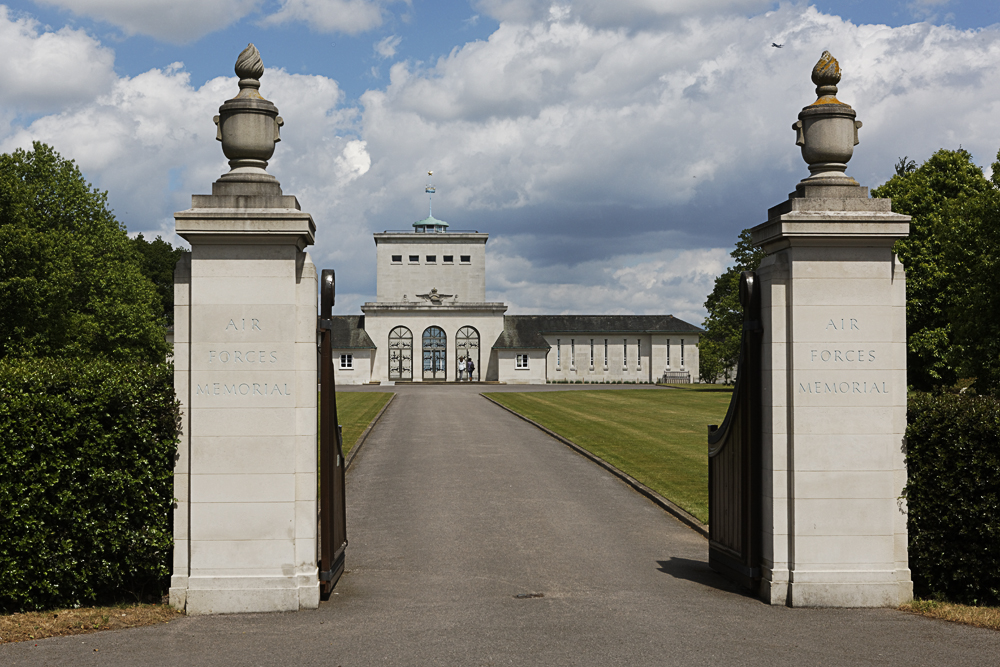
The Air Forces Memorial, near Egham in England, where Wipiti is commemorated

Wipiti joined No. 485 Squadron, a RNZAF unit, which at the time of his arrival, was stationed at Biggin Hill, in the English county of Kent, and operating Supermarine Spitfire fighters on escort missions, accompanying bombers carrying out daylight raids into Continental Europe. Wipiti shared in the destruction of a Focke-Wulf Fw 190 fighter on 16 September 1943, while covering a raid by Martin Marauder bombers on an airfield in France. He was killed on 3 October 1943 over France while escorting a bombing raid on a French power station. At the time of his death, he held the rank of warrant officer and had flown 26 sorties with No. 485 Squadron. Initially reported as missing he was reported as being presumed dead the following year.

== Legacy ==
Wipiti has no known grave and is commemorated on the Commonwealth War Graves Commission's Air Forces Memorial near Egham in Surrey, England. After the war, his parents were presented with their son's DFM by the Governor-General of New Zealand, Sir Cyril Newall, in a ceremony at Government House in Wellington. On 26 April 2023, a portrait of Wipiti was unveiled at his former secondary school, New Plymouth Boys’ High School, by his family. The painting, executed by Matt Gauldie, a former war artist of the New Zealand Army, was donated to the school by the New Zealand Remembrance Army.
