= Raymond Harries =

British flying ace (1916–1950)

Raymond Hiley Harries
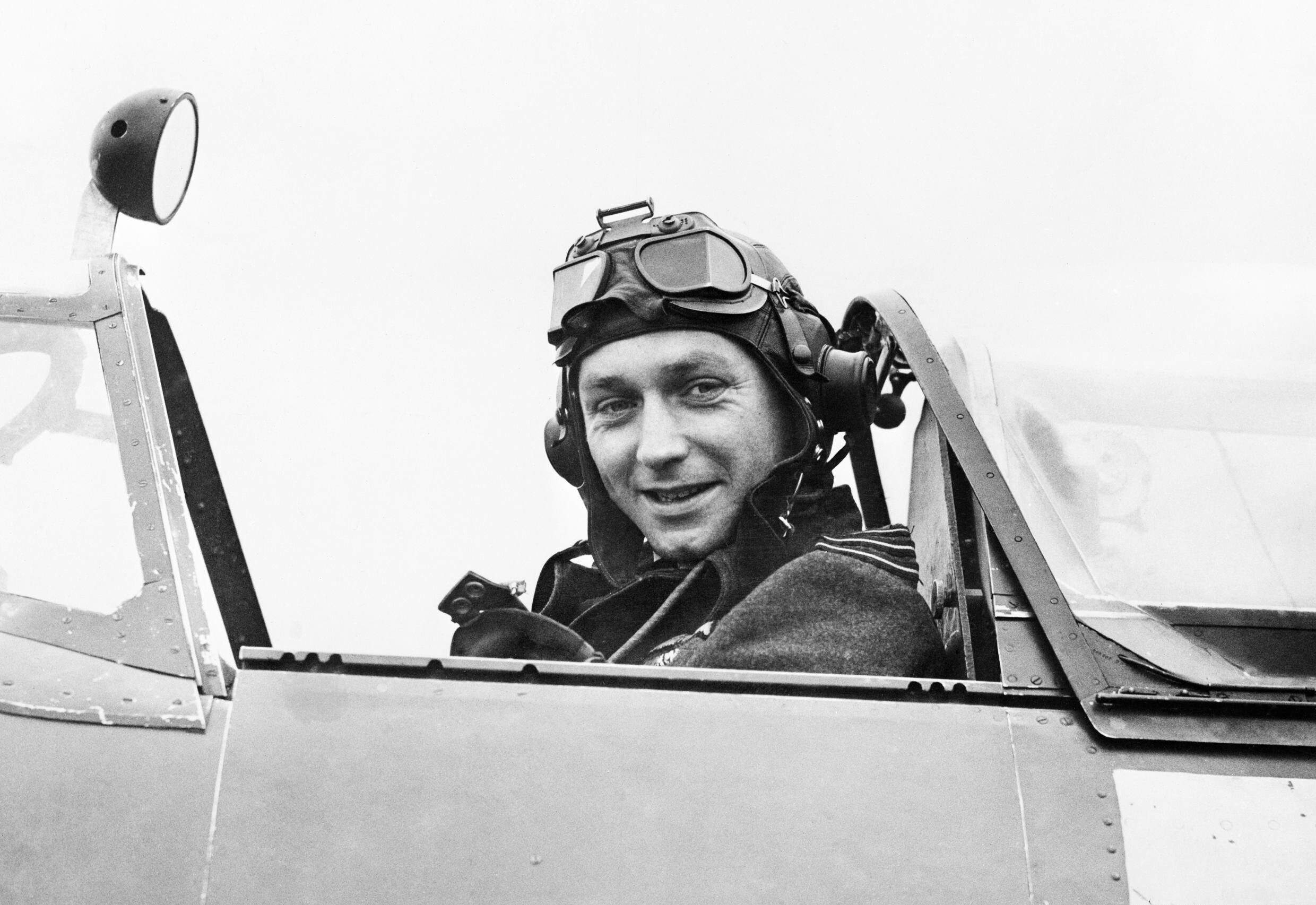
- Wing Commander Raymond Harries, commanding the Tangmere Wing, in the cockpit of his Spitfire Mk XII, 1943
- Born: 1916; South Wales
- Died: 14 May 1950 (aged 33–34) near Sheffield, Yorkshire
- Military career
- Allegiance: United Kingdom
- Branch: Royal Air Force
- Service years: 1939–1950
- Rank: Wing Commander
- Commands: No. 92 Squadron (1949–50); No. 135 Wing (1944–45); Westhampnett Wing (1943–44); No. 91 Squadron (1942–43)
- Conflicts: Second World War: Channel Front
- Awards: Distinguished Service Order & Bar; Distinguished Flying Cross & Two Bars; Croix de guerre (Belgium); Croix de guerre (France)

Raymond Hiley Harries, DSO & Bar, DFC & Two Bars (1916 – 14 May 1950) was a British flying ace who served with the Royal Air Force (RAF) during the Second World War. He was credited with having shot down at least twenty aircraft.

From South Wales, Harries joined the RAF on the outbreak of the Second World War. After completing his training he was posted to No. 43 Squadron, flying with this unit through the summer of 1941 while it served in Scotland. In February 1942 he joined No. 131 Squadron, with which he claimed his first aerial victories flying Supermarine Spitfire fighters. Awarded the Distinguished Flying Cross (DFC), in December he was appointed commander of No. 91 Squadron, another Spitfire unit. Further aerial victories followed until the squadron was taken off operations to reequip with the Mk XII Spitfire. Once it returned to operations, Harries became the most successful fighter pilot with the Mk XII with eleven aerial victories. He was commander of the Westhampnett Wing when he was rested from operations at the end of 1943, having been awarded two Bars to his DFC and the Distinguished Service Order. He spent the first few months of 1944 on a lecture tour in the United States before returning to operations as commander of No. 135 Wing, leading it on sorties to France. When the war ended in Europe, he was in a training role with No. 84 Group. Remaining in the RAF in the postwar period, he was commander of No. 92 Squadron at the time of his death on 14 May 1950 in an aircraft accident.

== Early life ==
Raymond Hiley Harries, the son of a bank manager, was born in South Wales in 1916. He was studying medicine at Guy's Hospital in London on the outbreak of the Second World War.

== Second World War ==
Joining the Royal Air Force, Harries was posted to No. 43 Squadron once his training was completed. Based at Drem in Scotland, No. 43 Squadron was equipped with Hawker Hurricane fighters and engaged in patrols over the North Sea, although for a period during the summer of 1941, it carried out night fighter operations. On one of these sorties, on 6 May, he intercepted a German bomber over the Firth of Forth, but had to pull away due to being low on fuel. In July he was posted to No. 52 Operational Training Unit at Debden as an instructor.

In February 1942 Harries, promoted to flight lieutenant, joined No. 131 Squadron as a commander of one of its flights. The squadron was based at Llanbedr and operated Supermarine Spitfire fighters. On 12 March he shared in the destruction of a Junkers Ju 88 medium bomber, the first aerial victory for a pilot of the squadron. In May, the squadron moved to Merston from where it operated on offensive sorties and bomber escort duties as part of the Tangmere Wing. On 5 June, while on a fighter sweep to Le Havre he damaged two Focke Wulf 190 fighters and was credited with the probable destruction of a third. On the morning of 19 August, the day of the landings at Dieppe, No. 131 Squadron provided air cover for Allied shipping. Harries destroyed a Fw 190 some 2 miles (3.2 km) from Dieppe. Later in the afternoon, he and three other pilots shared in the destruction of a Dornier Do 217 medium bomber that was attempting to attack a convoy. In September, Harries was awarded the Distinguished Flying Cross, the first pilot of No. 131 Squadron to receive this award. The citation, published in The London Gazette, read:

This officer, who has completed numerous sorties, is an excellent flight commander. He has spared no effort in the training of his pilots, amongst whom he has fostered a fine team spirit. He has destroyed 1 and assisted in the destruction of 2 more enemy aircraft.

— London Gazette, No. 35699, 11 September 1942

On 3 December, Harries was scrambled to intercept an unidentified aircraft approaching the southwest coast of England. Sighting the aircraft, which was found to be a Handley Page Halifax heavy bomber struggling with mechanical issues. He and his wingman escorted the Halifax to Tangmere but on the flight there Harries flew into cloud and his instruments were affected by icing. He became disorientated and on coming out of the cloud at around 1,500 feet (460 m) found himself in a dive; he was only just able to pull out in time. Three days later Harries flew on a sortie to Calais and shot down a Fw 190. This was to be his final aerial victory with No. 131 Squadron, for shortly afterwards he was promoted to squadron leader and posted to command of No. 91 Squadron.

=== Squadron command ===
No. 91 Squadron was another Spitfire unit, based at Lympne with a detachment at Hawkinge. Like Harries' previous unit, its duties involved escorting bombers and carrying out offensive operations to Europe. On 20 January 1943, while conducting a test flight of new radio equipment, Harries was alerted to the presence of Messerschmitt Bf 109 fighter bombers approaching London. He was able to intercept and destroy one Bf 109 near Beachy Head as it was returning to France. He also damaged a second Bf 109 and when some FW 190s arrived in the area and attempted to engage Harries, he damaged one of these as well. He shared in the destruction of a Fw 190 on 4 March over the English Channel and later in the month, on 24 March, shot down a Fw 190 and damaged a second, again mid-channel.

The following month, No. 91 Squadron relocated to Wittering, in the north of the United Kingdom, to re-equip with the new Rolls-Royce Griffon-powered Mark XII Spitfire over the next few weeks. During this time Harries was awarded a Bar to his DFC, the published citation reading:

This officer is a highly efficient squadron commander whose great keenness and energetic leadership have set a worthy example. In recent operations he has destroyed 3 enemy aircraft, shared in the destruction of another and damaged 3 more.

— London Gazette, No. 36027, 25 May 1943

No. 91 Squadron returned to Hawkinge on 21 May to resume operations. Four days later, he and his wingman were directed to intercept incoming fighter-bombers which, on sighting were found to be Fw 190s. Harries destroyed two of them, seeing both go down into the sea off Folkestone.

=== Wing commander ===
In June No. 91 Squadron moved to RAF Westhampnett to form a fighter wing with No. 41 Squadron, which also operated the Mark XII Spitfire. The Westhampnett Wing was tasked with bomber escort duties but also carried out offensive sorties to German-occupied Europe. On one of these, carried out on 16 July, Harries shared in the destruction of a Fw 190 as it took off from an airfield at Poix. Two days later he shot down three Bf 109s in the vicinity between Abbeville and Poix, shooting off the tail of one of these. Harries became wing leader of the Westhampnett Wing in August, and the following month was awarded a second Bar to his DFC. The citation read:

Since being awarded a bar to the Distinguished Flying Cross, Squadron Leader Harries has destroyed a further 4 enemy aircraft. In May 1943, he led the squadron in an engagement against 12 enemy fighters. In the combat 5 enemy aircraft were shot down, 2 of them by Squadron Leader Harries. During an engagement in July 1943, he destroyed 2 and damaged another enemy aircraft. This officer is a fine leader and a skilful and tenacious fighter.

— London Gazette, No. 36027, 7 September 1943

On 19 September Harries destroyed a Fw 190 over Bailleul and three days later he claimed one Fw 190 shot down and another as a probable to the south of Évreux. A further success was recorded on 27 September, when Harries shot down a Bf 109 to the north of Beauvais. Under his leadership, the Westhampnett Wing were the highest scoring wing in Fighter Command for the month of September, claiming 27 aircraft destroyed. On 20 October Harries shot down a pair of Bf 109s near Rouen, his last aerial victories flying the Mk XII Spitfire. With eleven victories in this type of Spitfire, he was its most successful pilot. In November, Harries was awarded the Distinguished Service Order (DSO). The published citation read:

This officer is an exceptionally skilful, courageous and determined fighter. Within the past weeks he has led his fighter force on various sorties during which 27 enemy aircraft have been shot down, 3 of them by his own guns. These successes pay an excellent tribute to this officer's inspiring leadership and great tactical ability. Wing Commander Harries has destroyed at least 15 enemy aircraft.

— London Gazette, No. 36241, 9 November 1943

=== Later war service ===
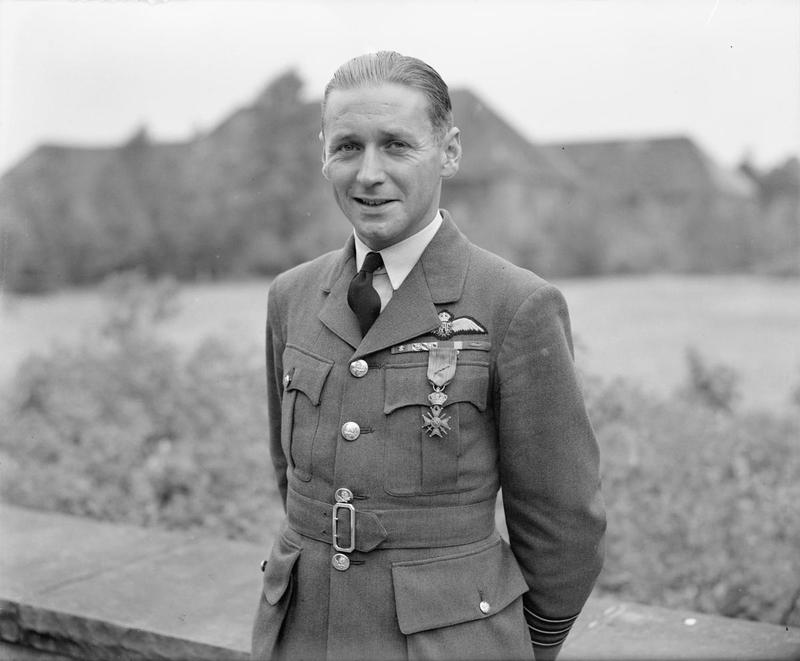
Harries on the occasion of being presented with the Belgian Croix de Guerre

At the end of the year, Harries was taken off active duties and selected to go to the United States to give talks regarding the operations of the RAF. Along with another experienced pilot, Wing Commander Bill Crawford-Compton, he spent three months in the country lecturing before returning to England. On his return, in the spring of 1944, he became wing leader of the Second Tactical Air Force's No. 135 Wing and, once the Allies invaded France, and led it from bases in France. Flying a Mk IX Spitfire on 25 July, he destroyed a Fw 190 near Routat while on a bomber escort mission. Awarded the French Croix de guerre in August, his final aerial victory was on 26 December, when he damaged a Messerschmitt Me 262 jet fighter to the south of Stavelot.

In January 1945 Harries underwent a conversion course at Predannack on the Hawker Tempest fighter, prior to the wing being re-equipped with the type, but once he returned to No. 135 Wing his tenure as commander only lasted two weeks before he was posted to No. 84 Group in a training role. Shortly after the end of the war in Europe, Harries was awarded the Belgian Croix de Guerre "in recognition of valuable services rendered in connection with the war". The following month Harries was awarded a Bar to his DSO.

== Postwar career ==
Remaining in the RAF in the postwar period, Harries was granted a permanent commission as a squadron leader. From November 1949 he served as commanding officer of No. 92 Squadron. On 14 May 1950 he was killed in an aircraft accident when his Gloster Meteor F4 jet fighter ran out of fuel and crashed near Sheffield, Yorkshire. His funeral was held at the RAF station at Linton-on-Ouse four days later.

Harries is credited with the destruction of twenty aircraft, five of which were shared with other pilots, and two more deemed probably destroyed. He also damaged six aircraft, one shared.
