= Patrick Jameson =

New Zealand-born royal air force (RAF) officer

Patrick Geraint Jameson
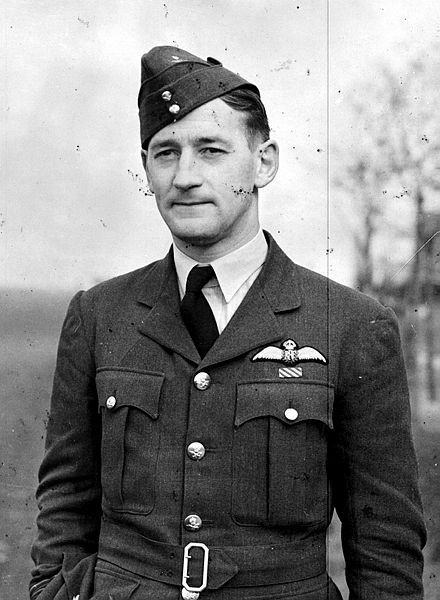
- Born: 10 November 1912; Wellington, New Zealand
- Died: 1 October 1996 (aged 83); Lower Hutt, New Zealand
- Military career
- Allegiance: United Kingdom
- Branch: Royal Air Force
- Service years: 1936–1960
- Rank: Air Commodore
- Nickname: Jamie
- Commands: RAF Wunsdorf (1952–54); RAF Schleswigland (1945–46); No. 122 Wing RAF (1944–45); Norwegian Wing (1942–43); Wittering Wing (1942); No. 266 Squadron (1940–41)
- Conflicts: Second World War; Norwegian campaign; Battle of Britain; Circus offensive; Dieppe Raid; Operation Market Garden
- Awards: Companion of the Order of the Bath; Distinguished Service Order; Distinguished Flying Cross & Bar; Mentioned in Despatches (3); War Cross (Norway); Silver Star (United States); Order of Orange Nassau (Netherlands)

Air Commodore Patrick Geraint "Jamie" Jameson, CB, DSO, DFC & Bar (10 November 1912 – 1 October 1996) was a New Zealand-born Royal Air Force (RAF) officer and a flying ace of the Second World War.

Born in Wellington, Jameson joined the RAF in 1936 and was posted to No. 46 Squadron on completing his flight training. During the Second World War, he flew in the Norwegian campaign, during which he shot down a German bomber. After the Allies withdrew from Norway, he and the rest of the squadron landed their Hawker Hurricane fighters on the flight deck of the aircraft carrier HMS Glorious. The ship was sunk the next day, and he was one of only two survivors from the squadron's aircrew. He was later awarded the Distinguished Flying Cross (DFC) for his services in Norway. He commanded No. 266 Squadron during the later stages of the Battle of Britain and then the Blitz, during which he destroyed two bombers. He then commanded a series of fighter wings on operations to the continent, including the Dieppe Raid, during which he shot down several more aircraft. By the end of the war, he had been awarded a Bar to his DFC and the Distinguished Service Order and was credited with destroying at least nine German aircraft.

Remaining in the RAF after the war, he served in a series of senior staff posts until his retirement in 1960. He settled in New Zealand and died in Lower Hutt, aged 83.

== Early life ==
Patrick Jameson, known as Jamie, was born on 10 November 1912 in Wellington, New Zealand, the son of R. D. Jameson, who was originally from Dublin. He was educated at Hutt Valley High School before taking up employment as an assurance clerk with Colonial Mutual Life Assurance. He learned to fly at the Wellington Aero Club, soloing in a Gipsy Moth in 1933. Deciding to join the Royal Air Force (RAF) a few years later, he left New Zealand on 7 January 1936 and travelled aboard the passenger ship Aorangi to England. On arrival in London, he applied to the RAF for a short service commission, which was accepted. He passed out as the top student of his class at the De Havilland Civil Flying School in Hatfield and in May, after an induction course at Uxbridge, went on to No. 8 Flying Training School at Montrose.

By January 1937, Jameson had completed his flight training and was posted to No. 46 Squadron. At the time, the squadron operated Gloster Gauntlet fighters from Kenley but later in the year shifted to Digby. During this period, he was part of an aerobatics flying team. He also became acquainted with fellow New Zealander Edgar Kain of No. 73 Squadron, which also flew from Digby. In February 1939, the Gauntlet was replaced with the Hawker Hurricane fighter.

== Second World War ==
On the outbreak of the Second World War on 3 September 1939, Jameson flew a night interception seeking out a German raider but to no avail. By this time Jameson had been promoted to flight lieutenant and was commanding one of No. 46 Squadron's flights. The squadron spent the early months of the war patrolling along the east coast of England, and on one occasion encountered a group of Heinkel He 115 seaplanes, shooting down three of them. This period otherwise passed generally without incident.

=== Norwegian Campaign ===
In early 1940, No. 46 Squadron was preparing to go to France but in May was abruptly sent to Norway instead, to support the British forces engaged in the campaign there. Transported by HMS Glorious, it operated from Bardufoss, flying patrols over the Royal Navy anchorage in Skånland Municipality, near Harstad and providing air support to British units engaged with the enemy. A few day after their arrival in Norway, Jameson led a section which caught two Dornier Do 26 seaplanes on the water; these were destroyed. The following day, he shot down a Junkers Ju 88 medium bomber.

In early June, the Allied forces were withdrawn from Norway. After providing air cover for the ground forces as they left, the Hurricanes of No. 46 Squadron landed on the flight deck of Glorious on 7 June. This was the first time Hurricanes had landed on a carrier. It had not been believed possible for them to do so without an arrestor hook and so the squadron was ordered to destroy the aircraft. The squadron's commander, Squadron Leader "Bing" Cross, persuaded the captain of the Glorious to let an attempt be made. Jameson and two others, with sandbags secured under their tail planes, made a successful test landing on the carrier's flight deck, and were followed by the other pilots of the squadron. During the campaign, the squadron flew 249 sorties.

The Glorious, along two escort destroyers, was intercepted on the way to the United Kingdom by the German battleships Scharnhorst and Gneisenau on 8 June. All three ships were eventually sunk by shelling. Jameson and Cross found themselves on a Carley float with thirty other survivors. After three days drifting in the freezing temperatures only seven men were alive to be picked up by the Norwegian cargo vessel, Borgund. The two RAF pilots were the only surviving pilots of their unit.

Initially taken to the Faroe Islands, where two of the survivors died, Jameson was transported to Scotland, where he was hospitalised for six weeks. His feet had been badly swollen from prolonged immersion in the water. He then went on sick leave for another six weeks. For his services in Norway, Jameson was awarded the Distinguished Flying Cross (DFC) in July 1940. The citation published in The London Gazette read:

This officer led his flight with determination over completely strange country during operations in the Narvik area. He discovered and set on fire, two four-engined enemy flying boats which were concealed against the almost vertical side of Rombaksfjord, in a position most difficult to attack. No trace of them was found during a reconnaissance shortly afterwards. The following morning he destroyed a Junkers 88 over Ofotfjord. During the previous seven months he has led his flight with skill and determination, both by day and by night, often in extremely bad weather conditions. His example has been an inspiration to the rest of the squadron.

— London Gazette, No. 34903, 23 July 1940.

=== Squadron leader ===
On regaining his fitness, Jameson took command of No. 266 Squadron, which flew Supermarine Spitfire fighters, in September. His squadron, based at Wittering, had been heavily engaged in the Battle of Britain and he was involved in the intensive training up of replacement pilots. As part of No. 12 Group, No. 266 Squadron was called upon to be part of the Duxford Wing but Jameson disliked this, noting his command had more success when operating conventionally.

Once the Battle of Britain ended, Jameson's squadron had a quiet spell but by early April 1941, it was involved in night fighter operations, seeking out German bombers raiding cities in the United Kingdom. On 9 April, during a bombing raid on Coventry, Jameson shot down a Heinkel He 111 medium bomber, engaging it at 19,000 feet (5,800 m). On the night of 10 May, during the largest bombing raid mounted on London by the Luftwaffe during the Blitz, Jameson destroyed another He 111, one of 24 shot down that evening.

=== Wing leader ===
In June 1941 Jameson was appointed commander of the Wittering wing, with a promotion to wing commander. He flew on several offensive operations to the continent as part of the RAF's Circus offensive. During a mission escorting Bristol Blenheim light bombers to northern France on 23 June, the wing was attacked by Messerschmitt Bf 109 fighters; Jameson managed to destroy one of these Bf 109s. Another Bf 109 was claimed as damaged by Jameson on 12 August, and the following month he destroyed a Messerschmitt Bf 110 heavy fighter. He was awarded a Bar to his DFC in October, the citation reading:

This officer has set a high standard in the performance of his duties. He is a fine leader whose unsparing efforts have contributed to the excellent fighting spirit of his fellow pilots. Wing Commander Jameson has destroyed six enemy aircraft, one being shot down at night, and he has damaged two others. His bearing in the face of the enemy has been of the highest order.

— London Gazette, No. 35297, 3 October 1941.

By this time Jameson was married; he had known his wife Hilda née Webster since high school and she travelled to the United Kingdom earlier in the year to join him. In the New Year Honours of 1942, he was mentioned in despatches for his war service. He continued to lead the Wittering wing through much of 1942 but in August, Jameson commanded a wing specially formed to provide cover for the Dieppe Raid of 19 August. Flying with No. 485 Squadron, he took part in four sweeps that day, destroying a Focke-Wulf Fw 190 fighter on one of them. In December, he was posted to North Weald to command the Norwegian Spitfire Wing, made up of Nos. 331 and 332 Squadrons. Over the next several weeks, he flew on 21 operations. In early February 1943, he narrowly avoided being shot down when, having become separated from his wingmen, he was attacked over St. Omer by a group of Fw 190s. His cannons became jammed early in the engagement and he had to dive away, losing the Fw 190s in the clouds. Despite a faulty compass he was able to make his way back to his airfield. Later in the month, he destroyed two Fw 190s while escorting Consolidated B-24 Liberator heavy bombers to Dunkirk; the wing claimed seven enemy aircraft destroyed that day. In early March he claimed another Fw 190 as probably destroyed. For his services as wing leader, Jameson was awarded the Distinguished Service Order. The citation, published on 9 March, read:

Since December, 1942, this officer has led the wing on 21 sorties in which 13 enemy aircraft have been destroyed. Early in February 1943, over France, the wing was attacked by some 60 enemy fighters. During the combat, Wing Commander Jameson was attacked by 8 of the enemy aircraft but he fought his way clear and eventually led the wing back to base without loss. Some days later, whilst acting as escort to a force of bombers, the wing engaged a large formation of enemy fighters and shot down 7 of them, 2 being destroyed by Wing Commander Jameson. By his inspiring leadership and fine fighting qualities, this officer has won the complete confidence of all with whom he has flown. Wing Commander Jameson has destroyed 9 enemy aircraft, 2 of them at night.

— London Gazette, No. 35930, 9 March 1943.

In May 1943, James was posted to the staff at the headquarters of No. 11 Group, working in a training and planning capacity. His role later expanded to responsibility for planning fighter operations for the group, at times bringing in support from neighbouring Nos. 10 and No. 12 Groups. In October, he was awarded the Norwegian War Cross by the King of Norway.

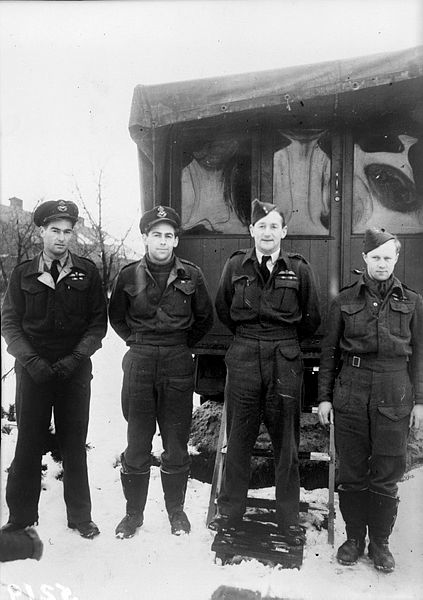
Jameson, stands third left with three New Zealand squadron leaders; from left to right, Evan Mackie, commander of No. 80 Squadron, Keith Thiele, commander of No. 3 Squadron, and Arthur Umbers, commander of No. 486 Squadron

In July 1944 Jameson took command of No. 122 Wing, which was composed of three North American P-51 Mustang-equipped squadrons and operating from Normandy at the time. The role of the wing was to provide air support for the advancing Allied forces, attacking German transportation and infrastructure. Later in the year, his wing was involved in Operation Market Garden. In October, the Mustang squadrons forming his wing returned to England and were replaced with four squadrons of Hawker Tempests. These continued to operate in support of the advancing Allied ground forces. By April, it was operating from Fassberg, in Germany, and had been joined by a squadron of Gloster Meteor jet fighters. Shortly after the end of the war in Europe, Jameson was mentioned in despatches in the King's Birthday Honours. He ended the war as a flying ace, credited with nine German aircraft destroyed, one probable and another shared, two damaged and two shared destroyed on water.

== Later life ==
No. 122 Wing, with Jameson still in command, moved briefly to Copenhagen before returning to Germany and being based at Flensburg, where it was disbanded in September 1945. Jameson was then appointed station commander at RAF Schleswigland, followed by a similar role at Wunsdorf from December. He was again mentioned in despatches for his war service in the 1946 New Years Honours. In March the following year, he was in Haifa, where he was studying at the RAF Staff College there. An appointment at the Air Ministry in England followed, where he worked on training for fighters. During this time, for his war service, he was awarded the Order of Orange Nassau by the Queen Wilhelmina of the Netherlands. The previous year he had been awarded the Silver Star by the United States, also for his war service.

After a period of leave spent in New Zealand, Jameson was posted to Fighter Command, as commander of the Day Fighter Leaders School at West Raynham. He was promoted to group captain in late 1949 and had a second period in command at Wunsdorf from 1952 to 1954. He then had a posting as the senior air staff officer (SASO) at the headquarters of No. 11 Group. After two years, he was promoted to air commodore and sent to Germany where he was SASO at the headquarters of the 2nd Tactical Air Force.

In June 1959, Jameson was appointed a Companion of the Order of the Bath in the Queen's Birthday Honours that year. After being treated for tuberculosis, which he had contracted earlier in the year, he served as Task Force commander of Operation Grapple at Christmas Island. He retired on 6 August 1960 and returned to New Zealand, where he settled in Lower Hutt. Jameson died on 1 October 1996 and is buried at Taita Cemetery.
