= No. 243 Squadron RAF =

Defunct flying squadron of the Royal Air Force

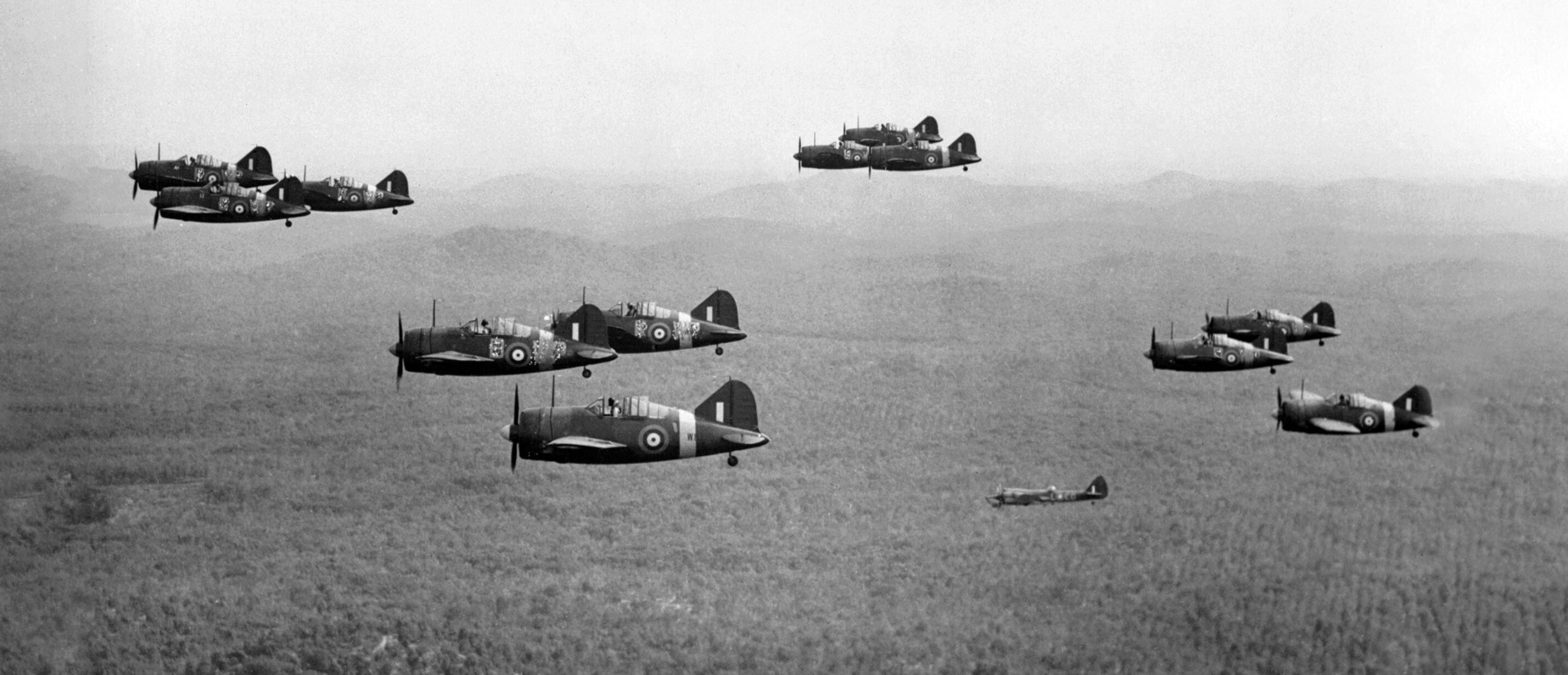
- Twelve Buffalo Mark I fighters of No. 243 Squadron in flight over the Malayan jungle, late 1941
- Active: 20 Aug 1918 - 15 Mar 1919; 12 Mar 1941 - 20 Jan 1942; 1 Jun 1942 - 31 Oct 1944; 15 Dec 1944 - 15 Apr 1946
- Country: United Kingdom
- Branch: Royal Air Force
- Motto(s): Swift in pursuit

Insignia
- Squadron Badge heraldry: A seahorse holding a sword erect
- Squadron Codes: NX (Apr 1939 - Sep 1939); SN (Jun 1942 - Oct 1944)

No. 243 Squadron was a flying squadron of the Royal Air Force. Originally formed in August 1918 from two flights that had been part of the Royal Naval Air Service, the squadron conducted anti-submarine patrols during the final stages of World War I. The squadron was later re-raised during World War II, operating initially as a fighter squadron in Malaya and Singapore during 1941–42. It was briefly disbanded just prior to the fall of Singapore, and was re-formed in mid-1942, again as a fighter squadron, and fought in the Tunisian and Italian campaigns in 1942–44, before being disbanded in October 1944. In 1945, after training on transport aircraft in Canada, the squadron moved to Australia where it operated in support of the British Pacific Fleet before disbanding in mid-1946.

== History ==
=== World War I ===
No. 243 Squadron was formed in August 1918 from Nos 414 and 415 Flights of the seaplane station at Cherbourg which had been functioning as an out-station of Calshot while part of the Royal Naval Air Service. From the time of its formation, the squadron equipped with Wight Converted and Short Type 184 seaplanes carried out anti-submarine patrols off the French coast and around the Channel Islands until the end of the war and it disbanded on 15 March 1919.

=== World War II ===
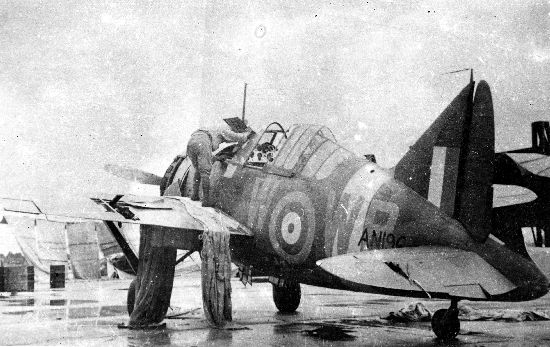
Brewster B-339E of No. 243 Squadron. This aircraft was flown by Flying Officer Maurice Holder, who flew the first Buffalo sortie in the Malayan Campaign on 8 December 1941, strafing landing barges on the Kelantan River. Damaged by ground fire, it was abandoned at RAF Kota Bharu, where it was captured by the Japanese.

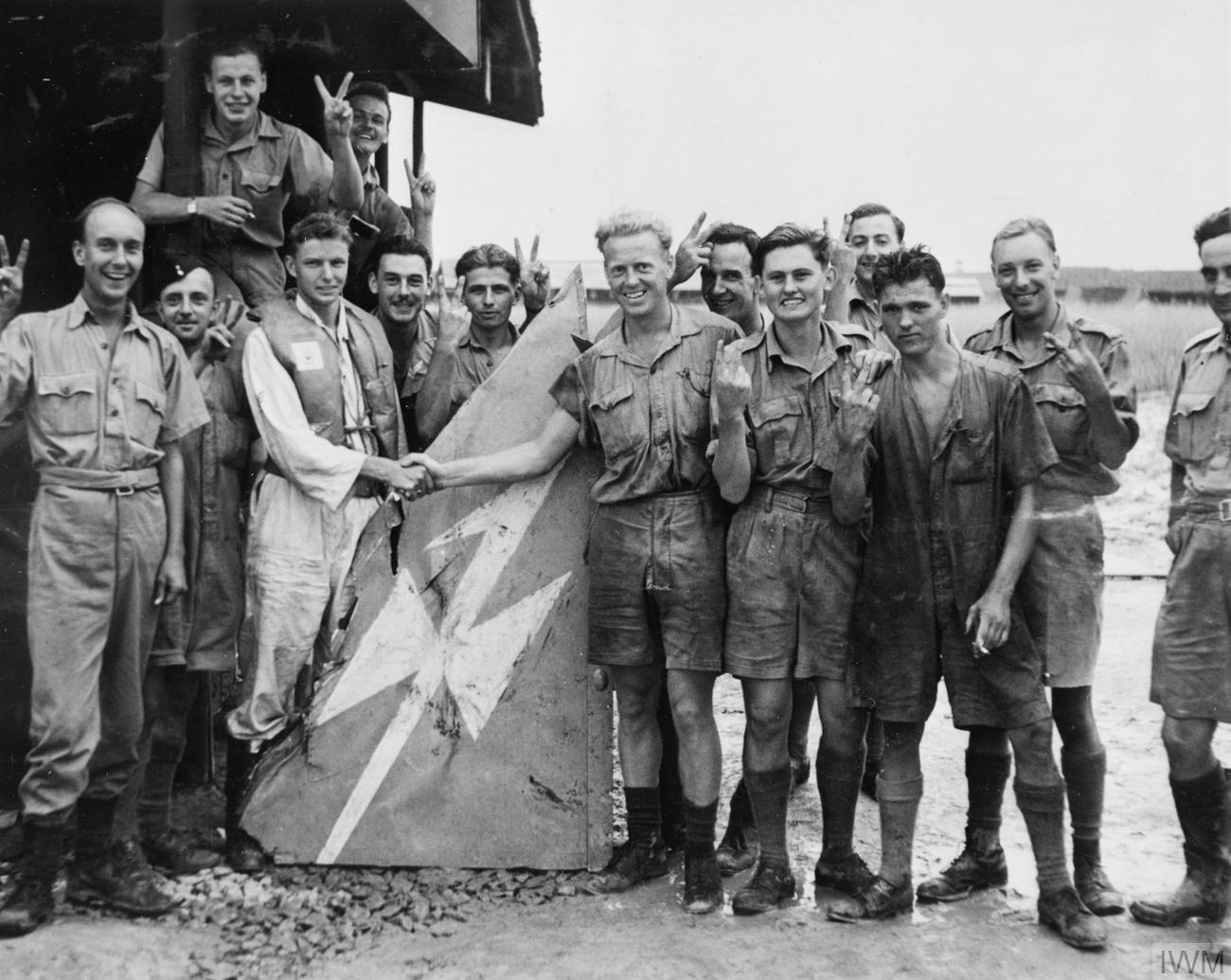
Sergeant Charles Kronk (wearing life preserver) with other members of No. 243 Squadron posing with the tail fin of a Japanese Ki-46 of 81st Sentai which he and Bert Wipiti shot down over Johore, Malaya on 10 January 1942

On 12 March 1941, No. 243 reformed at Kallang as a fighter squadron for the defence of Singapore. The shortcomings of its Brewster Buffaloes were soon apparent and when Japanese fighters came within range, the squadron suffered heavy losses and by the end of January 1942 was operating its surviving aircraft as part of a mixed force, the other Buffalo squadrons being in a similar state. Its identity was gradually lost to the evacuation of redundant personnel and by the time all fighters were withdrawn from the Singapore airfields, it no longer existed as a unit, having been disbanded on 20 January 1942.

On 1 June 1942, No. 243 reformed at Outston, taking over 242 Squadron's Supermarine Spitfires and became operational on the 12th. After defensive duties, it turned its aircraft over to 232 Squadron at the end of September and in November sailed for North Africa, where it became operational again with Spitfires in Algeria in January 1943. Commanded by Squadron Leader James Walker, for the rest of the Tunisian campaign, the squadron flew sweeps and provided escorts for day bombers attacking enemy bases and transport and in June moved to Malta for similar missions over Sicily. A few days after the Allied landings there, No. 243 moved into the beachhead, repeating this in September after the Salerno landings. In December 1943, it moved to the Levant and after fully converting to Spitfire IXs left for Corsica in April 1944. Escort missions and ground attack sweeps were flown over northern Italy and southern France and cover provided for the Allied landings on the French Riviera in August before the squadron was again disbanded on 31 October 1944.

No. 243 reformed on 15 December 1944 at Morecambe, two days before embarking for Canada where it began training with Dakotas. In January 1945, these began moving across the Pacific to Australia, where it became part of No. 300 Wing and conducted communications flights began between British bases in the South West Pacific area, mainly to British Pacific Fleet bases. By the end of the war the squadron was flying scheduled services and extended these to Hong Kong on its surrender. A large proportion of the squadron personnel was Australian and they were demobilised locally when No. 243 disbanded on 15 April 1946.

== See also ==
- Battle of Malaya
