= Oran Wendle Eagleson =

- Born: 1910; Unionville, Indiana, U.S.
- Died: 1997 (aged 86–87)
- Education: Indiana University Bloomington
- Scientific career
- Fields: Psychology
- Workplaces: North Carolina Central University; Spelman College

Oran Wendle Eagleson (1910–1997) was an American psychologist. He taught at the North Carolina College for Negroes, before teaching at Spelman College, Atlanta, where he became the dean of instruction and later the Callaway Professor of Psychology. He was the third black person in the United States to receive a doctorate degree in psychology. In 1985, he was awarded an honorary doctorate from Indiana University for "his service as a pioneer in the development of Black perspectives in psychology".

== Early life and education ==
Oran Wendle Eagleson was born in Unionville, Indiana in 1910. He graduated from Bloomington High School in 1927, received an A.B. bachelor's degree in psychology in 1931 from Indiana University followed by a master's in 1932 and a Ph.D. in 1935. Eagleson worked as a shoe shiner and shoe repair finisher from high school through graduate years.

== Career ==
It was hard for Eagleson to find employment with his psychology degree. He found a job in 1936 in Durham, North Carolina at the North Carolina College for Negroes, where he taught psychology, sociology, economics, and philosophy. After financial issues at the college, he moved to Atlanta, Georgia in 1936 to teach at Spelman, a women's college. At Spelman, he was highly paid, but psychology was not a major; it was an elective until a few years later. Eagleson also served as an exchange professor at Atlanta University where he taught graduate courses.

He became the dean of instruction at Spelman in 1954 and, in 1970, he was promoted to be the Callaway Professor of Psychology. He was also co-director of Morehouse-Spelman Intensified Pre-College program. Likewise, he was a lecturer and consultant in orientation and training project conducted by the Peace Corps.

In 1985, he was awarded an honorary doctorate in science by his alma mater, Indiana University, for "his service as a pioneer in the development of Black perspectives in psychology".

== Personal life and death ==
Eagleson came from a prominent family. His father Halson Sr, was a well-known merchant. His brother, Halson Jr, was the head of the physics department at Morehouse College. Another brother, Preston, was the first black intercollegiate athlete at Indiana University. His nephew, Wilson Vashon Eagleson, was a chemistry professor at West Virginia State College. Wilson's wife, Frances, was the first Black woman to graduate from Indiana University and their son, Wilson V. Eagleson Jr was one of the Tuskegee Airmen. In February 2022, the city of Bloomington changed the name of Jordan Avenue to Eagleson Avenue to honor the Eagleson family.

On 16 March 1940, Eagleson married first wife, Alberta Louise Johnson. She was a teacher who later joined the Biology department at Spelman. She died in 1960.

Oran Eagleson died on 8 January 1997 in Atlanta. He was 86.

== Bibliography ==
- Guthrie, Robert V. (2004), Even the rat was white a historical view of psychology (2 ed.), Allyn and Bacon, pp. xix, 144–145, 165, 181–183, ISBN 978-0-205-39264-3
