= Eagleson =

Eagleson is a surname. Notable people with the surname include:

- Alan Eagleson (born 1933), disbarred Canadian lawyer, convicted felon
- David Eagleson (1924–2003), judge of the Supreme Court of California from 1987 to 1991
- Dylan Eagleson, Irish boxer
- Ernest G. Eagleson, mayor of Boise, Idaho, in the 1910s and 1920s
- Owen Eagleson (1922–1994), New Zealand fighter pilot of the Second World War
- Ryan Eagleson (born 1974), former Irish cricketer
- Vashon Eagleson, college football coach for the North Carolina Eagles
- Thomas W. Keene (1840–1898), American actor, born Thomas R. Eagleson

== See also ==
- Eagleson Road (Ottawa Road #49) in Ottawa's west end in Kanata
- Eagleson Station (OC Transpo), in Ottawa, Ontario
