= Mick Ensor =

Officer in the Royal New Zealand Air Force

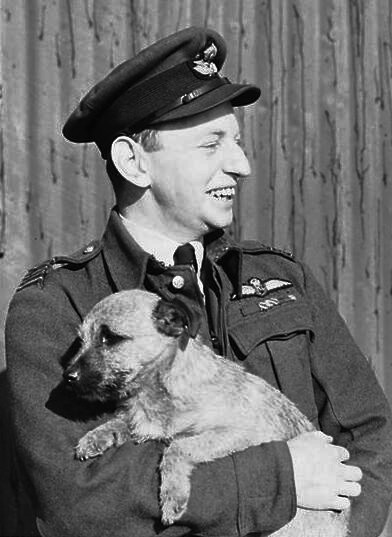
- Mick Ensor when he was a squadron leader at No. 224 Squadron, 1944
- Born: Maechel Anthony Ensor; 5 January 1922; Rakahuri, near Rangiora, New Zealand
- Died: 27 December 1994 (aged 72); Christchurch, New Zealand
- Military career
- Allegiance: New Zealand
- Branch: Royal New Zealand Air Force; Royal Air Force
- Service years: 1940–1947 (RNZAF); 1947–1965 (RAF)
- Rank: Wing Commander
- Commands: No. 224 Squadron; No. 217 Squadron
- Conflicts: Second World War; Battle of the Atlantic; Operation Torch; Operation Overlord; Cold War; Berlin Airlift
- Awards: Distinguished Service Order & Bar; Distinguished Flying Cross & Bar; Air Force Cross

Maechel Anthony "Mick" Ensor, DSO & Bar, DFC & Bar, AFC (5 January 1922 – 27 December 1994) was a highly decorated officer of the Royal New Zealand Air Force (RNZAF) during the Second World War. One of the most decorated New Zealanders to have flown in Coastal Command, he is credited with having sunk two U-boats.

Born at Rakahuri near Rangiora, Ensor joined the RNZAF in 1939 but did not commence his training until the following year. In 1941 he was sent to the United Kingdom to serve with the Royal Air Force. Posted to Coastal Command, he was a pilot with No. 500 Squadron, which operated Lockheed Hudson maritime patrol aircraft across the North Sea. He was awarded the Distinguished Flying Cross in early 1942 for a sortie during which his Hudson was damaged while attacking a shipping convoy. The squadron moved to Cornwall from where it patrolled the Bay of Biscay. Ensor later served in the Mediterranean theatre of operations and destroyed a U-boat on 13 November 1942, for which he was awarded the Distinguished Service Order. After a period of staff duties from January to July 1943, he was posted to No. 224 Squadron, flying the Consolidated B-24 Liberator heavy bomber. He eventually rose to the rank of wing commander and led the squadron during the final months of the war, sinking a U-boat on 5 May 1945.

Ensor remained commander of No. 224 Squadron in the immediate post-war period and transferred to the RAF in 1947. He was posted to Transport Command and flew extensively with No. 206 Squadron during the Berlin Airlift. After a period of service with the United States Navy on an exchange, he became commander of No. 217 Squadron, overseeing its conversion to the Lockheed P-2 Neptune maritime patrol aircraft. Much of his later service in the RAF was in staff and administrative roles which caused Ensor to become dissatisfied with his career. He was retired from the RAF on medical grounds in 1965. He returned to New Zealand and ran a transport company until his retirement in 1975. He died in Christchurch in 1994, aged 74.

== Early life ==
Maechel Anthony Ensor was born on 5 January 1922 at Rakahuri, a sheep station near Rangiora in Canterbury, New Zealand. He was the youngest of six children of Hugh Ensor, a sheep farmer, and his wife Kathleen. The spelling of Ensor's given name was apparently due to his father's dislike of the Irish and he was known as Mick. In 1930, the Ensor family moved to another sheep station that they owned at the foot of the Southern Alps, leaving Ensor's oldest brother in charge at Rakahuri. He was initially educated by correspondence, supervised by his mother, and combined this with work on the station. From 1935 to the end of 1938 he attended St Andrew's College in Christchurch as a boarder.

Ensor had an interest in aviation, and in 1933 had been taken on a short flight in the Southern Cross when Charles Kingsford Smith piloted it on a visit to Christchurch. Still too young to join the Royal New Zealand Air Force (RNZAF) when he left school, he took occasional flying lessons at the Canterbury Aero Club and also studied navigation. As his academic career had been average, he also took courses in algebra and trigonometry. In June 1939, he applied for a short service commission in the RNZAF but did not commence his training until the following July.

== Second World War ==
An induction course was held at the Ground Training School at Weraroa, in the North Island of New Zealand, before Ensor proceeded to Taieri, near Dunedin to begin elementary flying training on de Havilland Tiger Moth trainer aircraft. He completed this phase of training rated as "above average" and proceeded to No. 1 Flying Training School at Wigram airbase for further flight instruction on Airspeed Oxfords, a twin-engined trainer aircraft. He gained his wings on 16 January 1941 and was commissioned as a pilot officer the following month. He departed New Zealand on 27 February aboard the ocean liner Awatea, headed for Canada and then the United Kingdom to serve with the Royal Air Force (RAF). He arrived at Uxbridge on 2 May and was subsequently posted to Coastal Command, commencing his operational training at Andover on Bristol Blenheim light bombers.

=== Operations over the North Sea ===
In July 1941, Ensor was posted to No. 500 Squadron, which was based at Bircham Newton as part of No. 16 Group. His new unit was a Royal Auxiliary Air Force squadron operating Blenheims. He did not rate the aircraft, describing them as "not a machine to go to war in". The squadron was mainly engaged in search and rescue missions, but also shipping patrols and strikes, and raids on German airfields. Paired with Bert Paige, an observer, and Horace Roe, a gunner, he flew his first operation on 15 August, searching for rescue dinghies in the North Sea with two other Blenheims. Unbeknown to Ensor, one of the Blenheims was shot down. Further sorties were carried out in September and October, including night attacks on German-occupied France. Towards the end of the year, the squadron re-equipped with the Lockheed Hudson light bomber, a major improvement on the Blenheims.

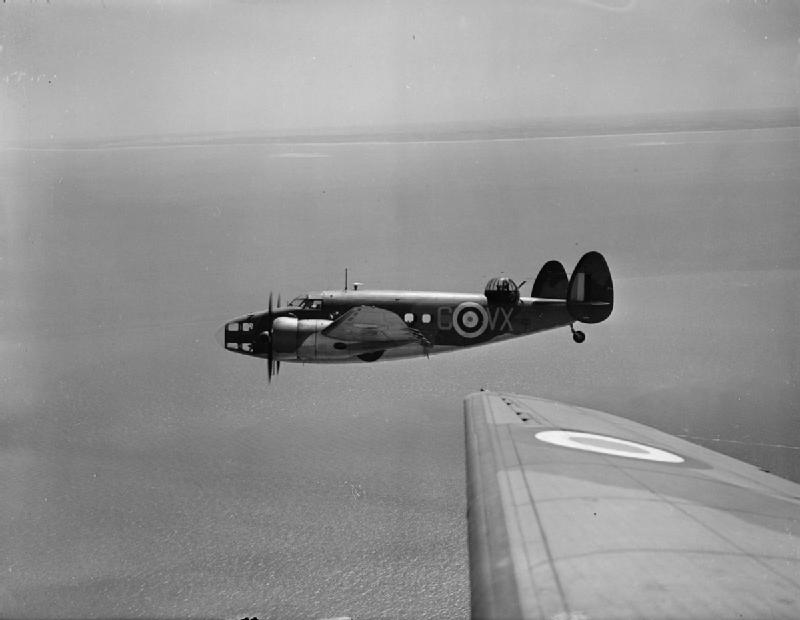
A Lockheed Hudson on patrol over the North Sea

One of his earliest sorties with the Hudson, carried out on the night of 29 January 1942, was a patrol to seek out German shipping near Heligoland, during which Ensor sighted and attacked a convoy of three vessels. One ship received a direct hit from a bomb dropped by Ensor, but during the attack the Hudson came into contact with the sea, causing damage to one of the propellers; at the time, Ensor believed that he had struck a rock. Shutting down the engine with damaged propellers, he made for the squadron's base back in England but inadvertently flew into Holland due to a faulty compass. Discovering his error, he dropped to low level for the return flight across Holland with his navigator, Bertram Paige, calling out approaching obstacles before increasing his height as they crossed the North Sea. Unable to locate an airstrip once they were over England, he made a belly landing in a field in Norfolk. Ensor was awarded the Distinguished Flying Cross (DFC) for his efforts while Paige received the Distinguished Flying Medal (DFM). The official announcement was made in The London Gazette on 20 February 1942. The published citation read:

One night in January, 1942, Pilot Officer Ensor and Sergeant Paige were the pilot and observer respectively of an aircraft which was engaged on an operational sortie over enemy waters. A convoy of 3 ships was observed sailing through the ice floes. Pilot Officer Ensor attacked the leading ship from mast height and scored direct hits with some of his bombs. Whilst taking violent evasive action at an extremely low altitude, the aircraft struck a rock which disabled the starboard engine, rendered all instruments and the turret unserviceable, and extinguished all the lights. Thus handicapped, Pilot Officer Ensor skilfully regained height in a heavy snowstorm but later, whilst flying over land and uncertain of his bearings, his aircraft was subjected to antiaircraft fire and searchlight activity for some 30 minutes. Eventually, the position was identified and, ably assisted by Sergeant Paige's excellent navigation, Pilot Officer Ensor flew across the sea with only one engine of his aircraft functioning. On reaching this country he was compelled to attempt a forced landing owing to shortage of petrol and, although it was snowing heavily, assisted by Sergeant Paige, who fired Verey lights in quick succession in an endeavour to illuminate the surroundings. Pilot Officer Ensor made a safe landing without further damage to the aircraft or injury to the crew. Throughout, this officer showed great courage, skill and tenacity and was greatly assisted by the coolness and efficiency of Sergeant Paige.

— London Gazette, No. 35463, 20 February 1942

In March, No. 500 Squadron shifted north to Stornoway in the Outer Hebrides, where it was tasked with patrolling the regions around the Shetland and Faeroe Islands, through which U-boats would pass as they travelled from their bases in Germany to the Atlantic. Ensor made his first attack on a U-boat on 27 April, the first to be sighted by an aircraft of No. 500 Squadron. All four of the depth charges carried by his Hudson were dropped and Ensor believed the submarine had at least been damaged due to a visible oil patch left after the U-boat submerged although this was not the case. Soon afterwards, he was promoted to flying officer. He made a second attack on a U-boat on 6 July, after one of his Hudson's crew spotted the submarine to the north of Stornoway. Having worked out more suitable tactics for attacking U-boats following his experience of 27 April, this time his approach was superior with depth charges being dropped on either side of the submarine. Despite this, no success was observed. On his fiftieth operational sortie, made on 24 August, he sighted another U-boat from 5,000 feet (1,500 m) and, dropping to low level, again attacked. He believed a direct hit had been achieved with at least one depth charge, observing a large oil patch after the submarine made a steep dive. However, German records do not show a loss of a U-boat on this date so the oil seen by Ensor may have been a decoy.

At the end of August, having served for five months at Stornoway, No. 500 Squadron went south to St Eval in Cornwall. From here, it flew patrols to the Bay of Biscay. Ensor's efforts during his service at Stornoway and then St Eval was rewarded with a Bar to his DFC; this was announced on 27 October 1942.

=== Service in the Mediterranean ===
In early November the squadron was transferred to the Mediterranean and, stationed at Gibraltar and then Tafraoui, was involved in Operation Torch; the Allied invasion of French North Africa. On 13 November Ensor sighted the submarine U-458 about 100 miles (160 km) to the north of Algiers. He released two depth charges which forced the U-boat, which had submerged as his Hudson approached, back to the surface. He made further attacks using his machine-guns which killed some of the submarine's crew but had to abandon his efforts when the Hudson ran low on ammunition, allowing the U-boat to escape.

Three days later Ensor spotted U-259 on the surface about 60 miles (97 km) from Algiers and mounted an attack. Releasing his Hudson's depth charges at only 50 feet (15 m), one struck the U-boat and immediately exploded rather than rolling into the sea and detonating at a pre-determined depth. Although the U-boat was sunk, the resulting shock wave caused significant damage to the Hudson as it passed overhead; Ensor was briefly knocked unconscious but recovered in time to bring the aircraft under control. The Hudson's flying performance was severely compromised as both wing tips were bent at near right angles, the elevator tabs on the tailplane had been lost and the rudders were only just functional. Struggling with the trim of the aircraft, he brought the entire crew into the cockpit area to improve the weight distribution and turned for Algiers. The engines struggled to maintain good flying speed and on reaching Algiers harbour, one gave out. The crew all bailed out, Ensor being the last to exit the aircraft. He and the rear gunner were quickly collected by Royal Navy sloops, but the bomb aimer and navigator were both killed. For this exploit, which was described in the Official History of New Zealanders serving with the RAF as "the most spectacular U–boat attack of the whole war", he was awarded the Distinguished Service Order (DSO) on 16 February 1943. The rear gunner, Horace Roe, was awarded the DFM. The published citation read:

In November, 1942, Squadron Leader Ensor and Sergeant Roe were captain and rear gunner of an aircraft employed on an anti-submarine patrol. During the flight, a U-boat was observed on the surface of the sea and Squadron Leader Ensor attacked it from a height of 50 feet, causing it to blow up. The force of the explosion caused severe damage to the aircraft. Sergeant Roe, after reporting the damage to his captain, left his turret and, with complete disregard for his own safety, commenced jettisoning all moveable equipment in an effort to assist his captain to keep the aircraft airborne. Squadron Leader Ensor made great efforts to retain control but, although he succeeded in climbing to 1,500 feet, 1 engine failed and he was compelled to give orders for the aircraft to be abandoned. In the face of most harassing circumstances Squadron Leader Ensor, gallantly supported by Sergeant Roe, displayed courage and devotion to duty of a high order.

— London Gazette, No. 35904, 16 February 1943

=== Return to Europe ===
In the meantime Ensor, who was the first man in Coastal Command to hold the DSO, the DFC, and a Bar to the DFC, was sent to the United Kingdom to discuss his exploit with RAF officials and collect a replacement aircraft. Once there, at the request of Air Vice-Marshal Philip Joubert de la Ferté, he was instead posted as a staff officer to the headquarters of Coastal Command at Eastbury Park as an acting squadron leader. Concurrently with this promotion, his substantive rank was made up to flight lieutenant. He remained at Eastbury Park, working under Captain D. V. Peyton-Ward on improving tactics for dealing with U-boats, until July.

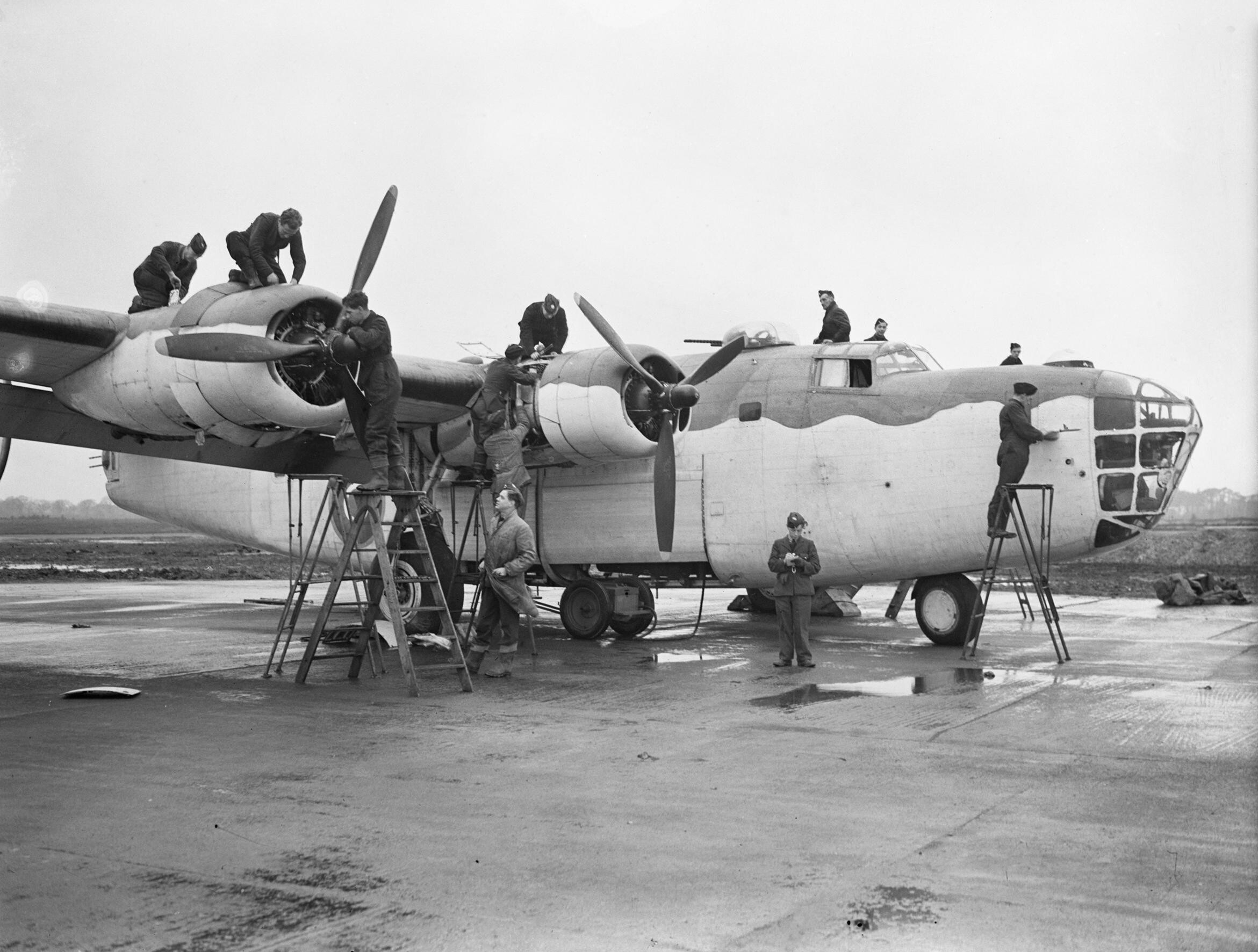
A B-24 Liberator of No. 224 Squadron at Beaulieu, late 1942

Ensor desired a return to operational flying and on 20 July he was posted to an Operational conversion unit at Beaulieu for familarisation with the Consolidated B-24 Liberator heavy bomber, which equipped some Coastal Command squadrons operating on long range anti-submarine patrols. In late August, he was posted as a flight commander to No. 224 Squadron, stationed at St Eval and commanded by fellow New Zealander Wing Commander A. E. Clouston. On 3 September he made the first of many patrols, of over 11 hours in duration, to the Bay of Biscay. On one of these, carried out on 10 October, he attacked a submarine that was spotted 300 miles (480 km) to the west of Brest. His first pass saw him launch several rocket projectiles, an experimental weapon, at the submarine which killed two of its crew members. A second pass was aborted when the submarine was identified as not being German. It transpired that it was the Minerve, a Free French submarine, which had strayed off course; Ensor was exonerated of any blame, the captain acknowledging that he had disobeyed orders to surface in daylight.

From January to May 1944, Ensor flew a total of ten sorties, one of which was an unsuccessful patrol to detect a Japanese submarine that was making its way to a German U-boat base in the Bay of Biscay. By this time, Ensor had a new crew as he had become dissatisfied with the performance of the original, with a number of potential contacts with U-boats being lost due to inattention. As Operation Overlord (the invasion of Normandy) approached, Coastal Command stepped up its patrolling operations to prevent the German Kriegsmarine (German Navy) from interfering with Allied shipping. No. 224 Squadron was one unit involved with patrolling the western end of the English Channel to guard against U-boats sneaking through. On the night following the Normandy landings, he and his crew attacked a U-boat with depth charges, damaging and forcing it to submerge.

=== Squadron command ===
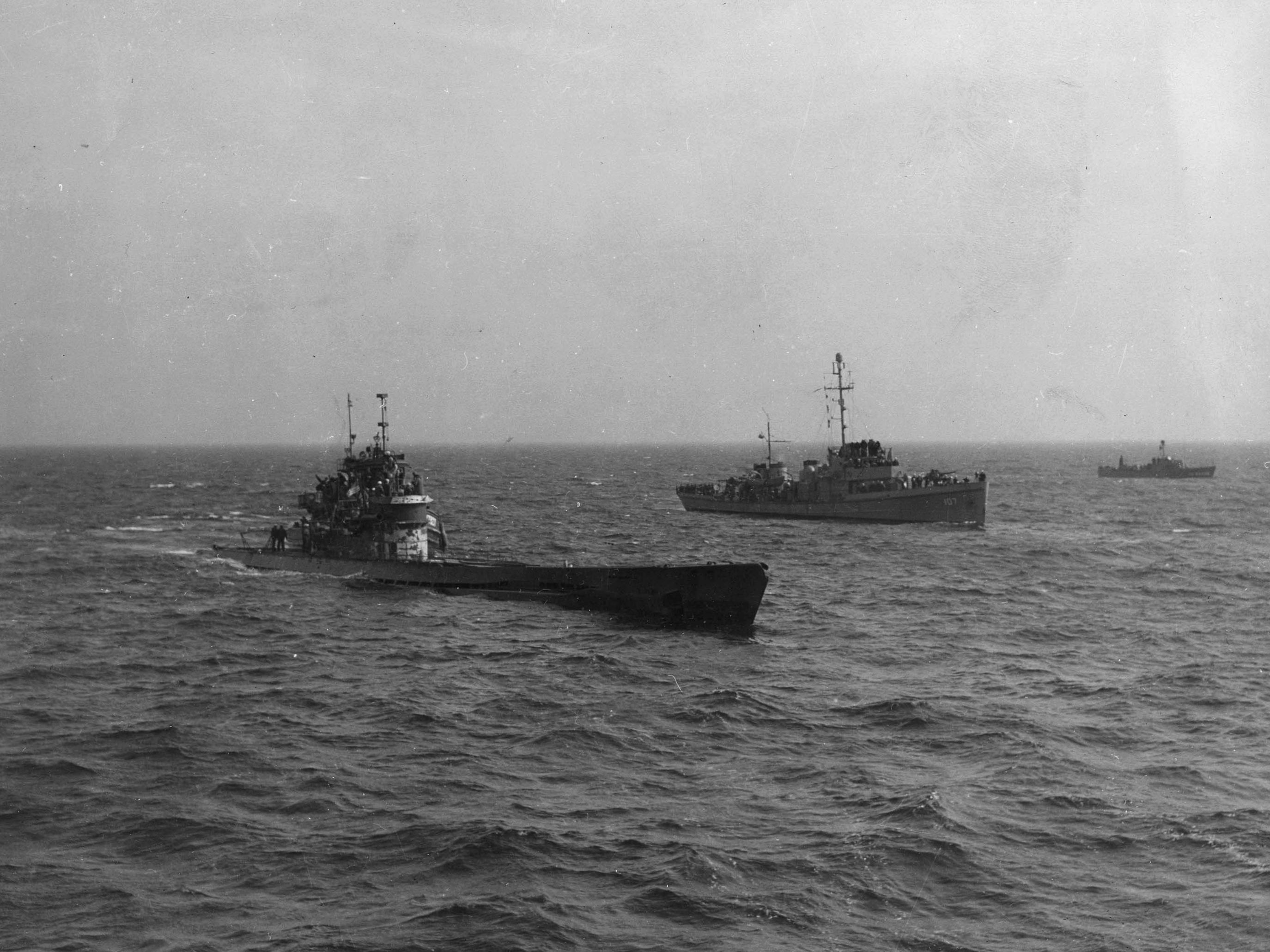
The U-1228, damaged by Ensor's aircraft on 18 September 1944 and seen here after the end of the war

In September, No. 224 Squadron was moved north to Milltown, along the northern coast of Scotland. Its task was to seek out and destroy U-boats operating from Norway. On the night of 18 September, patrolling near Bergen, he attacked and damaged the U-1228, forcing its return to base. His own Liberator had also been damaged in the engagement, with Ensor later describing it as "thoroughly ventilated". At the start of 1945, he was promoted to acting wing commander and appointed commander of No. 224 Squadron. Just a month later, on 6 February, he was awarded a Bar to his DSO, in recognition of his service with the squadron.

Although administrative work now occupied much of his time, he tried to fly operationally as much as he could. On his last sortie of the war, carried out on 5 May, he sighted and attacked the U-579, one of five submarines travelling in convoy together to Norway. The U-579 was sunk along with 24 of its crew. This was the second confirmed submarine to have been destroyed by Ensor in 114 sorties; not only was he one of the most successful sub-hunter pilots of the war, he was also one of the most decorated New Zealanders to have flown in Coastal Command. During his period in command of No. 224 Squadron, it was responsible for the destruction of seven U-boats.

== Post-war service ==
Ensor intended to either stay in the RNZAF or transfer to the RAF but was also open to a career in civil aviation. Ultimately, Ensor decided that opportunities in the postwar RNZAF would be limited and his senior officers, particularly Air Vice Marshal Sturley Simpson, the commander of No. 18 Group, convinced him to apply for a transfer to the RAF. In the interim, he continued to command No. 224 Squadron, which was now stationed back at St Eval. He saw little flying time, logging a little over 200 hours in the air as a pilot from the end of the war in Europe until the cessation of his squadron command, in January 1947. He then spent from March to September in New Zealand on leave. By this time, he was married and had a son, the first of four children. His wife, Patience Coote, was a former Women's Auxiliary Air Force officer who he had met at Lossiemouth in 1944. While in New Zealand he was granted a permanent commission in the RAF with the rank of flight lieutenant.

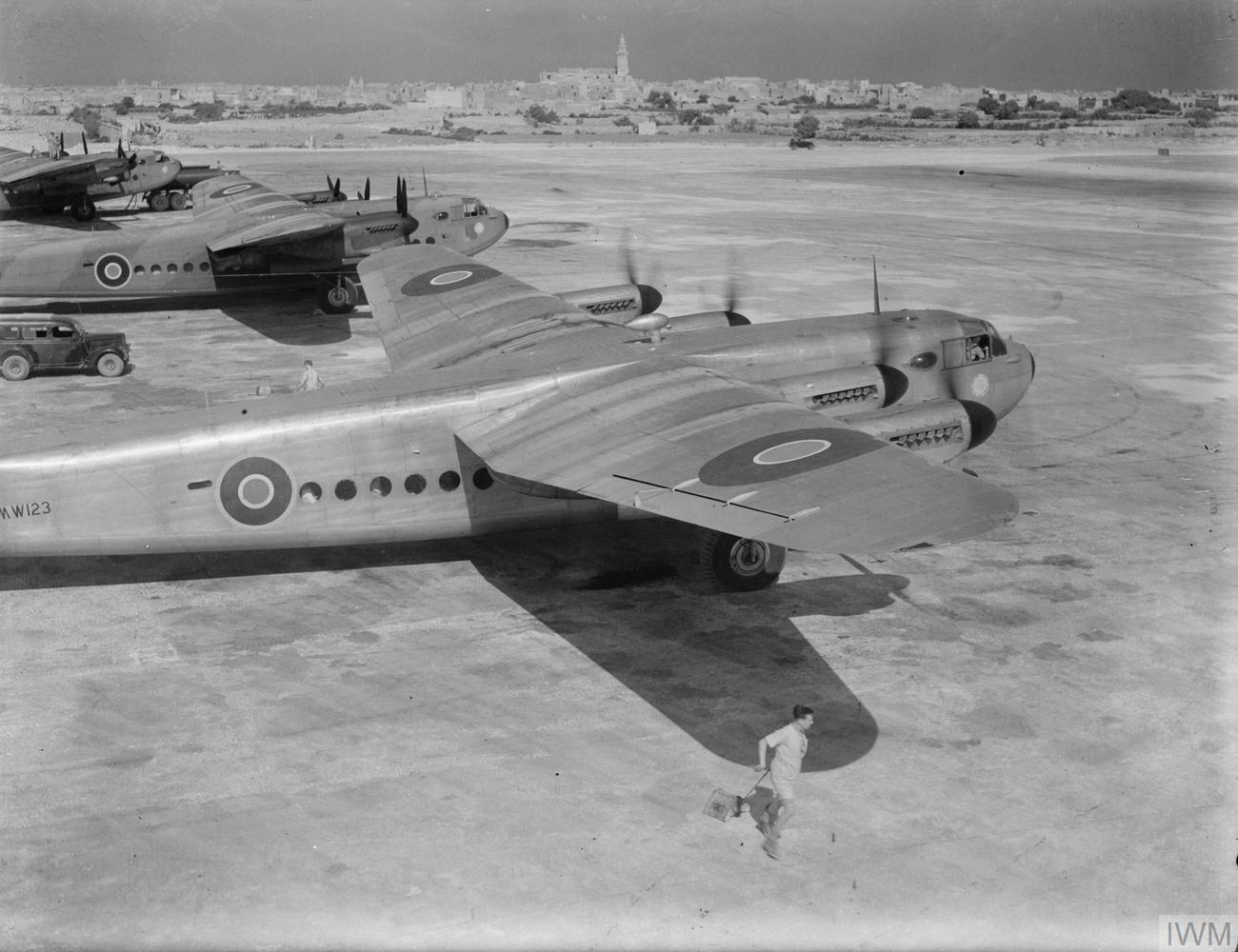
An Avro York transport aircraft, the type flown by Ensor in the Berlin Airlift

On returning to the United Kingdom, Ensor was initially posted to the headquarters of No. 46 Group, before being trained on the Blind Approach Beacon System. He then went to a conversion unit to learn to fly the Avro York transport after which, in March 1948, he was posted to No. 206 Squadron, a Transport Command unit at Lyneham in Essex. To house his family, he and his wife purchased a large property near Great Bardfield in Essex. His initial flying duties involved ferrying freight and passengers to the Mediterranean, Middle East and Asia but from June, the squadron was assigned to the Berlin Airlift. Over the next nine months, Ensor went on to fly a total of 200 sorties, from Wunstorf, in the British-controlled region of Germany, to Gatow in West Berlin, transporting food and coal. He considered his work at this time to be "the most useful job I ever did".

In May 1949, Ensor was posted to the United States Navy (USN) on an exchange, being assigned to Fleet Air Wing 4. This operated Lockheed P-2 Neptune maritime patrol aircraft from Ault Field on Whidbey Island, in the state of Washington. Ensor's role was as a staff officer at headquarters although he sought to fly as much as possible. Promoted to squadron leader in July, he flew regularly as a second pilot. Early the following year he began flying Neptunes as the primary pilot. In December 1950 he was assigned to Patrol Squadron 2 and given command of his own aircraft. For the next several months, he flew maritime patrols and navigational exercises, including making flights from Kodiak Island in Alaska to the Aleutian Islands and close to Russian air space. He ended his exchange with the USN in August 1951, and returned to the United Kingdom for a period of leave.

Ensor resumed service in the RAF with a posting to No. 210 Squadron at St Eval in November 1951, in anticipation of being given command of a squadron to be equipped with Neptunes. The following January he was appointed commander of the newly reformed No. 217 Squadron, the first unit in the RAF to receive Neptunes, staffed with personnel that Ensor had selected during his time with No. 210 Squadron. The squadron trained in anti-submarine warfare as well as seeking out hostile surface vessels. In mid-1953, it performed a flypast over Glasgow in honour of the coronation of Queen Elizabeth II and the following month, participated in the RAF's review at Odiham.

In January 1954, Ensor was posted back to Coastal Command headquarters at Eastbury Park in a staff role. He found time for the occasional flight but much of his work involved administrative matters. In that year's Queen's Birthday Honours, he was awarded the Air Force Cross. Another staff role followed in May 1955, this time at the headquarters of No. 18 Group at Pitreavie Castle. During this time, he experienced his first flight in a jet fighter, flying the de Havilland Vampire T11. He was promoted to wing commander at the end of the year although he was growing increasingly dissatisfied with his RAF career, due to the relatively little flying time he was able to achieve.

In May 1957, Ensor was posted to Strubby for several weeks to undertake a conversion course on jet fighters, flying Gloster Meteors, before going on to more advanced training at Manby on Hawker Hunters and English Electric Canberras. While he had hoped for a posting to a unit operating jet aircraft, he returned to duty with Coastal Command with a posting to Kinloss as chief instructor at the Maritime Operational Training Unit. This operated the obsolete Avro Shackleton, used for maritime reconnaissance. His dissatisfaction with the RAF grew and he began to regularly drink to excess. At the start of 1960, he was sent to the United States for a near six-month course at the Armed Forces Staff College at Norfolk, Virginia. Following this, he was assigned to the Air Ministry, working in the Directorate of Flying Training.

Ensor's next posting was to Malta in July 1963, where he was stationed at the RAF's headquarters there. By this time, he was aware that he was unlikely to receive further promotion in the RAF. Additionally, his drinking had come to the attention of senior officers. This was increasingly problematic, not helped by his lack of enjoyment of his staff role at Malta, and in late 1964, he was medically repatriated to England. Due to his state of health, he retired from the RAF with effect from 28 November 1965.

== Later life ==
Ensor initially settled in his property in Essex, taking up painting and gliding as hobbies. By 1967 he and his wife had decided to return to New Zealand and once the property sold, relocated to Christchurch towards the end of the year. He set up a transport company, catering to tourists and recreational hunters travelling into the Canterbury high country. His wife became ill in 1975 and died the same year. At this time, Ensor went into retirement. His final years were spent at St Winifred's Hospital in Christchurch, where he died on 27 December 1994. He was survived by his four sons.
