= Raymond Cammock =

New Zealand flying ace of WWII

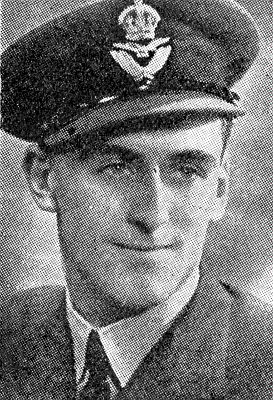
- Born: 4 July 1923; Christchurch, New Zealand
- Died: 6 October 1944 (aged 21); Near Arnhem, Netherlands
- Burial place: Lochem New General Cemetery, Netherlands
- Military career
- Allegiance: New Zealand
- Branch: Royal New Zealand Air Force
- Rank: Flying Officer
- Units: No. 486 Squadron (1944); No. 253 Squadron (1942–1943); No. 485 Squadron (1942)
- Conflicts: Second World War: North African campaign; Operation Diver; Western Front (1944–1945)
- Awards: Distinguished Flying Cross

Raymond Cammock DFC (4 July 1923 – 6 October 1944) was a flying ace of the Royal New Zealand Air Force (RNZAF) during the Second World War. He is credited with the destruction of at least 20 V-1 flying bombs.

From Christchurch, Cammock joined the RNZAF in August 1941 and was sent to England to serve with the Royal Air Force (RAF) once his training was completed the following year. He briefly served with No. 485 Squadron before being posted to No. 253 Squadron in September 1942. He flew Hawker Hurricane fighters extensively with this unit during the later stages of the campaign in North Africa. He returned to the United Kingdom in July 1943, and served with research and training units for several months. In May 1944, Cammock was posted to No. 486 Squadron, which was staffed with mostly New Zealand flying personnel and operated the Hawker Tempest fighter. The squadron was engaged in Operation Diver, the RAF's campaign against the V-1, with Cammock being one of its most successful pilots. Killed on 6 October during a strafing attack on a train in the Netherlands, he was posthumously awarded the Distinguished Flying Cross.

== Early life ==
Raymond John Cammock was born on 4 July 1923 to David John and Bertha Agnes Cammock in Christchurch, New Zealand. He was educated at Papanui Technical College and once his schooling was completed, he worked as a clerk for the New Zealand Government's Tourist bureau in Christchurch.

== Second World War ==
Cammock enlisted in the Royal New Zealand Air Force (RNZAF) in August 1941 and commenced his training as an airman pilot at RNZAF Station Weraroa, near Levin. He proceeded to No. 3 Elementary Flying Training School the following month, making his first solo flight on 4 October. After further training at No. 1 Flying Training School, he gained his wings and a promotion to sergeant pilot in January 1942. He was sent to the United Kingdom the next month to serve with the Royal Air Force (RAF). After a period of training at No. 61 Operational Training Unit for familiarisation on Supermarine Spitfire fighters, he was posted to No. 485 Squadron in July.

His new unit, composed largely of New Zealand flying personnel and equipped with Spitfires, was based at Kings Cliffe, in No. 12 Group's area of operations from where it carried out convoy patrols over the North Sea. Cammock flew only seven sorties with the squadron before he was transferred to No. 253 Squadron on 6 September. Stationed at Hibaldstow, the squadron operated the Hawker Hurricane fighter and was preparing to be deployed to North Africa. Arriving at Maison Blanche in Algeria in November, its duties were to protect shipping destined for Algiers. Cammock flew 97 sorties during his time with No. 253 Squadron, and with another pilot, shared in the destruction of one enemy aircraft. He returned to the United Kingdom in July 1943.

In August, Cammock was assigned to the Air Fighting Development Unit as a staff pilot. Commissioned as a pilot officer a few months later, in March 1944 he was posted to No. 1695 Bomber (Defence) Training Flight, again as a staff pilot, flying Hurricanes.

=== Operation Diver ===
In May 1944 Cammock was posted to No. 486 Squadron and not long afterwards was promoted to flying officer. A New Zealand fighter squadron that was part of the RAF, it was equipped with the Hawker Tempest fighter and, flying with No. 150 Wing as part of the Second Tactical Air Force (2TAF), carried out attacks on transportation infrastructure in northern France, as well as on shipping along the coastline. Following the invasion of Normandy, it patrolled over the English Channel. In mid-June, the squadron was withdrawn from the 2TAF and, flying from Newchurch, tasked with destroying German-launched V-1 flying bombs targeting southeast England as part of Operation Diver, the RAF's campaign against these weapons.

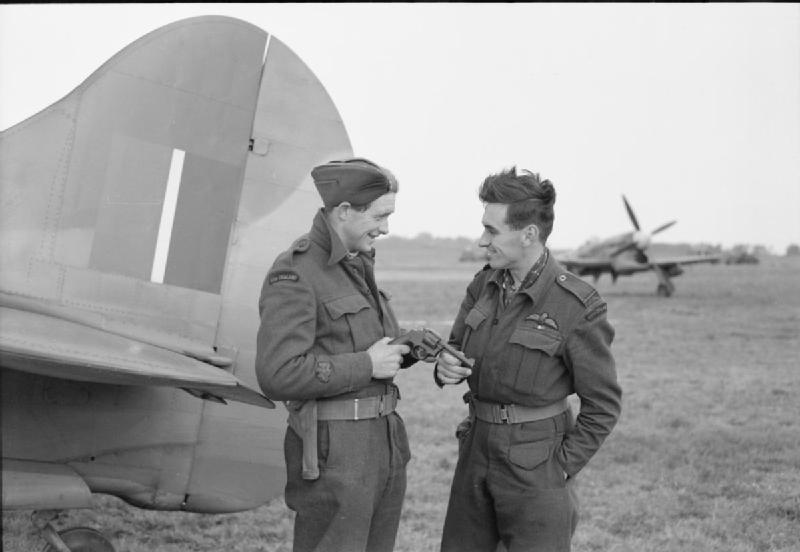
Cammock stands on the right, next to Owen Eagleson; the two were the most successful pilots of No. 486 Squadron's campaign against V-1 flying bombs

On 28 June, Cammock intercepted a V-1 heading for Hastings, closing in and destroying it at close range. He would go on to destroy several more over the following weeks, including two in one sortie in late July. By the time the squadron's role in Operation Diver had ended at the end of August, he had destroyed 20 V-1s, the second-most successful pilot of No. 486 Squadron behind Warrant Officer Owen Eagleson.

=== Service in Europe ===
In September, No. 486 Squadron moved to Europe and rejoined the 2TAF. It carried out armed reconnaissance sorties and close air support operations from airfields in Belgium and then the Netherlands. On 6 October, Cammock, who was making his 116th sortie with the squadron, and seven other pilots were seeking out targets of opportunity near Arnhem and spotted a train. As he made a low-level strafing attack, his Tempest was struck by anti-aircraft fire and it crashed into the train and exploded, killing Cammock.

There is some confusion regarding Cammock's tally of aerial victories. Some sources credit him with having destroyed 20 V-1s, and a half share in one enemy aircraft. However, military aviation historians Christopher Shores and Clive Williams state that the half share was actually for a V-1, and do not mention any aircraft destroyed by Cammock. He was posthumously recognised for his successes with an award of the Distinguished Flying Cross. The announcement was made on 8 December; the citation, published in The London Gazette, read:

This officer has displayed great zest for operations and has completed a large number of varied sorties. He has set a fine example of skill and courage and his devotion to duty has been unflagging. Flying Officer Cammock has destroyed 20 flying bombs.

— London Gazette, No. 36831, 8 December 1944

Cammock, who was survived by his wife and son, was originally buried at Eefde in the Netherlands but after the war, his body was re-interred at Lochem New General Cemetery, where five other graves of Commonwealth personnel are located, in Lochem in the province of Gelderland. In 2021, during work on the railway line at Wagenvoortsdijk in the Netherlands, remnants of his Tempest were found. A tunnel in the locality was named for him in 2022, with members of his family present for the unveiling ceremony.

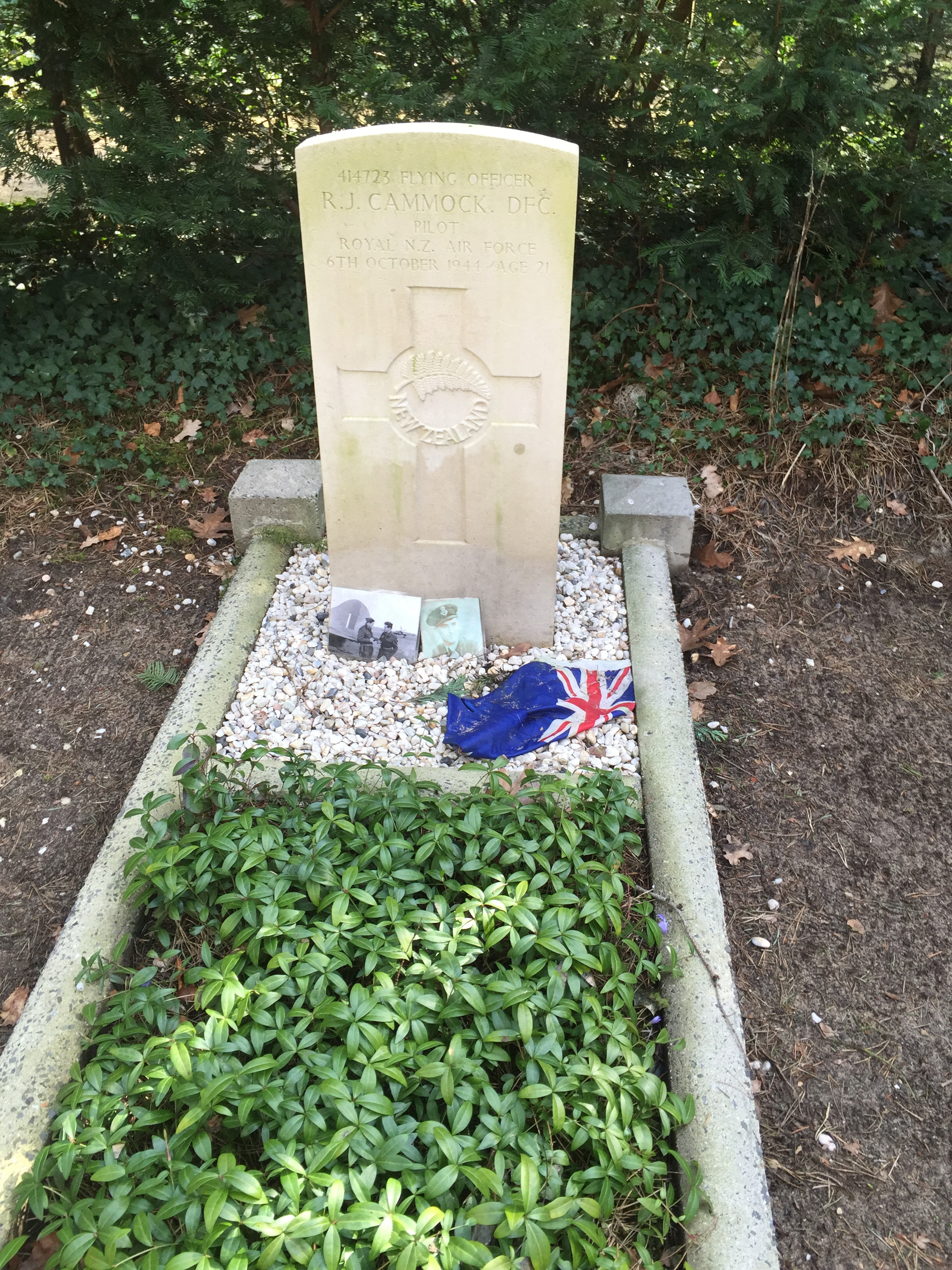
The grave of Raymond Cammock at Lochem New General Cemetery in the Netherlands
