= Halson V. Eagleson =

American physicist (1903–1992)

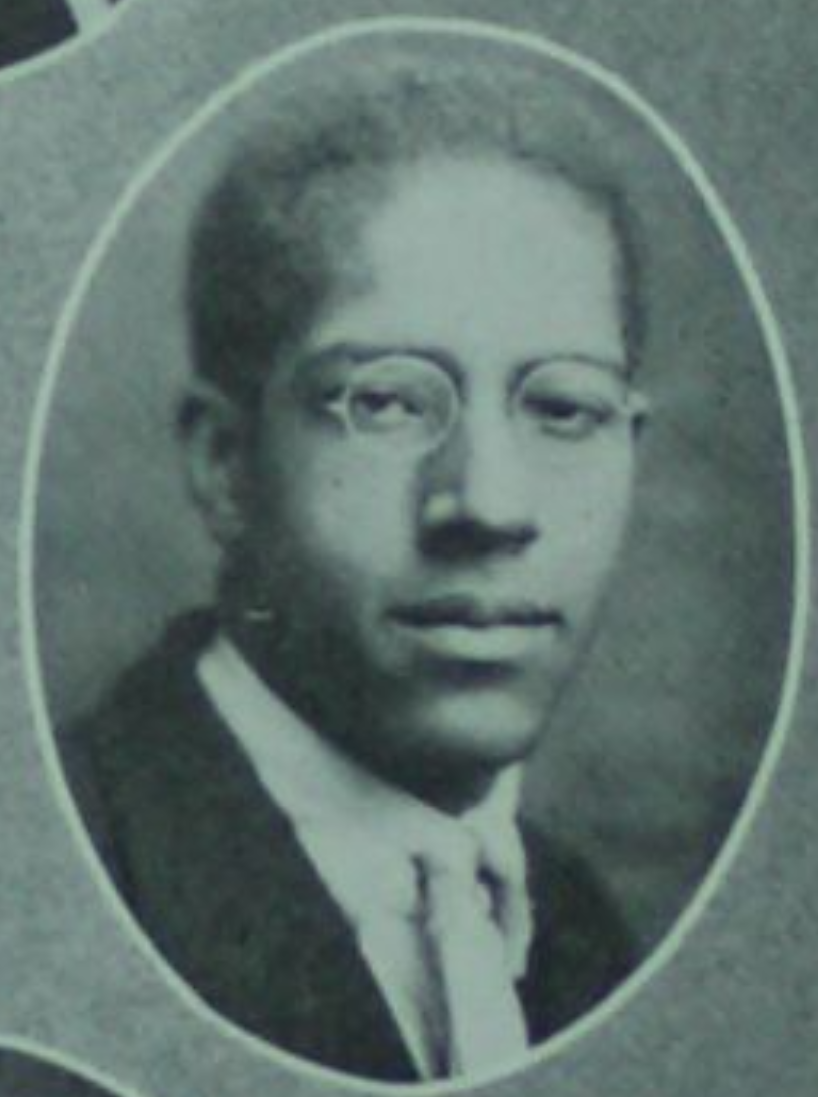
- Eagleson in his 1921 senior photo at Bloomington High School
- Born: March 14, 1903; Bloomington, Indiana, U.S.
- Died: September 23, 1992 (aged 89); Washington, D.C., U.S.
- Education: Indiana University Bloomington
- Scientific career
- Workplaces: Howard University
- Thesis: The influence of certain atmospheric conditions upon sound transmission (1939)

Halson Vashon Eagleson Jr. (March 14, 1903 – September 23, 1992) was an American physicist and professor. Eagleson's research focused on acoustics and the behavior of sound.

Eagleson came from a prominent black family in Bloomington, Indiana. After earning his PhD from Indiana University in 1939, he was appointed professor of physics and head of the department of physics at Morehouse College and Clark College (now Clark Atlanta University) in 1940. In 1947, he became professor of physics at Howard University and served there for 24 years where he researched acoustics and the behavior of sound.

== Early life ==
Halson V. Eagleson Jr., was born on March 14, 1903, in Bloomington, Indiana. He was one of six children born to Halson Vashon Eagleson Sr. (1851–1921) and his second wife, Eliza Ann Loggins, and mother to his four youngest children.

== Family ==
Eagleson's father had been born into slavery and moved to Bloomington in the 1880s, where he operated Eagleson Shaving Parlors and was a well-known barber in the Bloomington area. The Eagleson family was prominent in the Bloomington and Indiana University communities, and five of six children attended the university. Eagleson's brother Oran became a pioneer black psychologist and educator. Another brother, Preston (1876–1911), became the first African American intercollegiate athlete at Indiana University Bloomington. Preston's son, Wilson Vashon Marshall, later married Frances Marshall Eagleson, who was the first Black woman graduate from Indiana University. Their son, Wilson V. Eagleson, became a decorated United States Army Air Force officer and combat fighter pilot with the 332nd Fighter Group's 99th Fighter Squadron, best known as the Tuskegee Airmen.

In February 2022, the city of Bloomington changed the name of the north–south street that cuts through the Indiana University campus to Eagleson Avenue, honoring the Eagleson family. The street had previously been named Jordan Avenue, after David Starr Jordan, a former president of the university who had been a proponent of eugenics.

== Education ==
Eagleson attended primary and secondary schools in the Bloomington area, and there he first developed an interest in physics and music. He then went on to attend Indiana University Bloomington, where he received his bachelor's degree in 1926. He remained at the university for his graduate studies, completing his master's degree in 1931 and his PhD in 1939. His thesis, publishing in 1939, was titled "The influence of certain atmospheric conditions upon sound transmission." Upon receiving his doctorate he became the first African American person in the history of the university to earn the degree in physics, and the fifth African American person in the country to receive a PhD in physics. Eagleson was preceded by Hubert Mack Thaxton (PhD 1938, University of Wisconsin–Madison), and received his degree the same year Herman Branson also graduated with a PhD, from University of Cincinnati.

As a student, Eagleson played in dance and string bands to help finance his tuition. He was the first African American student to be elected to Sigma Xi, the honorary science society. He was also the first African American person at the university to earn an "I" letter in band. However, in 1922 as Eagleson was preparing to receive the "I," he was kidnapped by white students affiliated with the Ku Klux Klan who attempted to prevent him from performing at a Purdue University game and earning the letter. Shortly before leaving to play in the November 10, 1922, Indiana-Purdue game in Lafayette, Indiana, three white students kidnapped Eagleson and took him to Spencer, Indiana, causing him to miss the bus to the game. At one point, a man posing as a detective appeared and arrested Eagleson. He was eventually found and his kidnappers were brought to trial in 1923, but the all-white jury did not charge any of the students. The Eagleson family later refiled the case, which was dismissed for lack of evidence. Sixty years passed before Eagleson formally received his "I" letter in band for his musical achievements, after a 1982 alumni meeting in Bloomington.

== Career ==
In 1927, while still pursuing his graduate studies, Eagleson began working as an instructor in mathematics and physics at Morehouse College. There, he also served as the college's band director.

He later was appointed professor of physics and head of the department of physics in 1940 in a joint appointment at Morehouse College and Clark College (now Clark Atlanta University). In 1947, he became professor of physics at Howard University and served there for 24 years. For three years he served as chairman of the department of physics at Howard. At Howard, he taught undergraduate and graduate courses, including an introductory physics course, and carried out research on acoustics.

After his retirement from Howard, Eagleson worked as a part-time physics teacher at the University of Maryland, College Park and at the University of the District of Columbia until 1989. That year, however, he had a stroke and retired permanently from teaching.

In addition to his tenured teaching appointments, he worked as a professor, assistant director, and staff member at National Science Foundation summer institutes in Georgia, Alabama, Louisiana, Texas, Maryland, North Carolina, and South Carolina. He also worked more broadly as an advisor to the NSF.

Outside of his teaching duties, he also was a consultant for the Environmental Protection Agency on noise pollution, and a member of an advisory group that evaluated scientific instruments developed by Bell Labs. He was also known for training many of the radiological monitors in the Washington, D.C. area.

He participated in numerous professional organizations throughout his career, and in 1948 he served as president of the National Institute of Science, one of the oldest science organizations serving historically Black colleges and universities.

== Awards and legacy ==
In 1972, the first formal meeting of African-American physicists was held at Fisk University in Nashville, Tennessee, in an event called the Day of Scientific Lectures and Seminars (DOSLAS). This first meeting was organized to honor the work of Eagleson, John McNeile Hunter, and Donald A. Edwards. About 40 physicists attended this meeting, and it was the impetus for the creation of the National Society of Black Physicists, which was formally established in 1977.

In 1985, Indiana University awarded Eagleson with an honorary degree in science.

== Select publications ==
- "Physics activities examinations in large classes," The Physics Teacher, 1979
- "Identification of Musical Instruments When Heard Directly and over a Public‐Address System," Journal of the Acoustical Society of America, 1947 (with Oran W. Eagleson)
- "An Experimental Method for Determining Coefficients of Sliding Friction," American Journal of Physics, 1945
- "The Influence of Certain Atmospheric Conditions upon Sound Transmission at Short Ranges," Journal of the Acoustical Society of America, 1941
- "An Improved Tube for Producing Anomalous Dispersion of Sodium Vapor," Review of Scientific Instruments, 1936
- "The Effect of Humidity on the Reverberation Period of a Room", Indiana Academy of Science Proceedings, 1930

== Awards ==
- Distinguished service citation from the American Association of Physics Teachers (1974)
- Silver Beaver award of the Boy Scouts of America
- First recipient of the National Physics Fellow's Award

== Personal life ==
Eagleson was married twice. His first wife, Eula Strong, died in childbirth. He later married Helen B. Clark and they had two children.

Outside of his teaching career and professional life, Eagleson was active in religious communities, as a member of the Mount Carmel Baptist Church in Washington, D.C., the Gideons International group, and the National Capital Area Council of Churches. He was also a member of the Anglers All group, a fishing club. He was fluent in Spanish, French, and German, and played numerous instruments, including the piano, saxophone, clarinet, and violin.
