= Thaxton =

Thaxton may refer to:

== Places ==
- Thaxton, Mississippi
- Thaxton, Virginia

== People ==
- Charles Thaxton (born 1939), American author on intelligent design
- David Thaxton (born 1982), British musical theatre and opera performer
- Hubert Mack Thaxton (1909–1974), American physicist
- Jae Thaxton (born 1985), American football player
- Jim Thaxton (born 1949), American football player
- Jon Thaxton (born 1974), English professional boxer
- Lloyd Thaxton (1927–2008), American writer, television producer, director, and television host

== See also ==
- William L. Thaxton Jr. House
