= William E. Wallace =

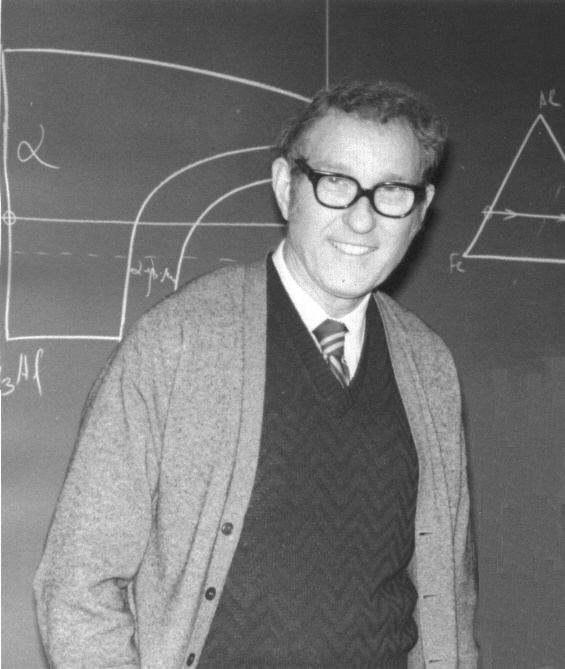
William E. (Ed) Wallace, American Chemist (1917–2004)

William E. Wallace (1917–2004) was a preeminent physical chemist whose career coincided with the golden age of chemistry. He received a bachelor's degree in chemistry from Mississippi College in 1936, and a Ph.D. in physical chemistry from the University of Pittsburgh in 1941. As many prominent scientists of his era, he worked on the Manhattan Project during the Second World War, but he returned to the University of Pittsburgh as a faculty member in 1945. He remained there for the rest of his career, eventually becoming the fourth chairman of the chemistry department from 1963 to 1977, and then a Distinguished Service Professor Emeritus. He formally retired from the university in 1983, but his research continued. He was associated with the Mellon Institute of Industrial Research, and he started a research corporation (Advanced Materials Corporation) in the Oakland section of Pittsburgh with offices on an upper floor of a building on North Bellefield Avenue, midway between the University of Pittsburgh and Carnegie Mellon University. He was accustomed to taking the stairs to his office, sometimes two at a time, while his younger colleagues struggled to keep up with him.

As chairman of the University of Pittsburgh Chemistry Department, he championed the construction of a new, high-rise chemistry building (Johnstone, Newcomer and Valentour, Architects) that was dedicated in November, 1974, and the move of the department from its former location in Alumni Hall. Wallace's research spanned many fields, including measurements of low temperature specific heat, investigation of magnetic and superconducting materials, and metal hydrides. The latter are useful as hydrogen storage materials. A commonality of much of this research was low temperature. Liquid helium was used in great quantity, and one room on the ground floor of the new chemistry building was equipped to recover helium gas from experiments and re-liquefy it.

Wallace's main scientific interest was the synthesis and characterization of intermetallic compounds of the rare earths, which include the Lanthanide elements of the periodic table. For this research he assembled a huge team of graduate students and post doctoral associates from many countries, including Argentina, Egypt, India, Japan, Romania, Russia, and China. He was the author of Rare Earth Intermetallics (Academic Press, 1973). He is credited, along with scientists from Bell Laboratories (among whom was Jack Wernick), with the discovery of the powerful rare-earth permanent magnets that are used extensively in permanent-magnet motors today.

Ed Wallace succumbed to Parkinson's disease on October 28, 2004. His close associate, Raymond S. Craig, also a professor in the depatartment, died of prostate cancer on June 30, 2006.

== Additional sources ==
- Department of Chemistry Newsletter (University of Pittsburgh, Fall 2005), Issue 2, p. 12.
- Much of this article is a personal reminiscence of Devlin Gualtieri, who was a post-doctoral research associate of Ed Wallace from 1974 to 1977. He was co-author with Ed Wallace of the following:
- D.M. Gualtieri, K.S.V.L. Narasimhan, and W.E. Wallace, Magnetic Properties of the Hydrides of Selected Rare-Earth Intermetallic Compounds with Transition Metals, A.I.P. Confer. Proc. 34, 219-221 (1976).
- D.M. Gualtieri and W.E. Wallace, Hydrogen Capacity and Crystallography of ErFe_{2}-Based and ErCo_{2}-Based Ternary Systems, J. Less Common Metals 55, 53-59 (1977).
- W.E. Wallace, S.K. Malik, T. Takeshita, S.G. Sankar, and D.M. Gualtieri, Magnetic Properties of Hydrides of the Rare Earths and Rare Earth Intermetallics, J. Appl. Phys. 49, 1486-1491 (1978).
- S.G. Sankar, D.M. Gualtieri, and W.E. Wallace, Low Temperature Magnetic Properties of the Hydrides and Deuterides of Er(Fe_{1−X}Mn_{X})_{2}, in The Rare Earths in Modern Science and Technology, edited by G.J. McCarthy and J.J. Rhyne, Plenum (New York), 1978, pp. 69–74.
- D.M. Gualtieri and W.E. Wallace, Absorption of Hydrogen by LaNi_{5}, NdCo_{5}, and ErCo_{3} at Low Temperatures, J. Less Common Metals 61, 261-264 (1978).
