= Marcellus Neal =

Marcellus Neal (1868–1939) was the first African-American graduate of Indiana University in the United States. He graduated in 1895 with a B.A. in Mathematics. The Neal-Marshall Center on the Indiana University Bloomington campus is jointly named for Neal and Frances Marshall, the first African-American female student to graduate from Indiana University.

== Early years ==
Neal was born in 1868 in Lebanon, Tennessee, but the family later moved to Greenfield, Indiana. Neal excelled academically at the local high school, graduating with distinction.

== Education and career ==
Neal's high school academic record earned him a scholarship to Indiana University, where he enrolled in the fall of 1891. He did well academically and graduated with a Bachelor of Arts degree in Mathematics on June 19, 1895. During his time at Indiana University, Neal was a member of the Married Folks' Club. His wife is listed as Mrs. M. Neal, in the Arbutus, the Indiana University yearbook. However, her name is listed as Caledonia in Frank O. Beck's book on race relations at Indiana University. She was a southern teacher, whose teaching skills were highly regarded. The Neals were not allowed to live on campus, enter the Indiana Memorial Union, or eat in establishments on campus.

For ten years after his graduation from IU, Neal did graduate work, held short-term teaching jobs, and traveled, spending time in both Europe and Canada. For nearly twenty-five years, he served as the head of the science department at Washington High School in Dallas, Texas. Neal and his wife left Dallas to live in Chicago, Illinois, where he worked at a Civil Service job. He also completed a treatise on science and wrote political editorials for African-American newspapers.

== Death and legacy ==
On October 20, 1939, Marcellus Neal was struck by a driver in a hit and run at State and 37th Street in Chicago. He died of his injuries on November 6 and was buried in Mount Greenwood Cemetery, in Glenwood, Illinois.

The Neal-Marshall Alumni Club was founded in 1981 as a means of meeting the needs of black students, faculty, and staff, while also promoting African-American history at Indiana University. The organization was actually founded in Jackson, Mississippi, while other Indiana chapters soon followed in Gary, and Indianapolis.

The Neal-Marshall Black Culture Center opened on the Indiana University campus in 1969. The center was originally called the "Black House," but renamed the Black Culture Center in 1972. The Center was located in various buildings on campus, but moved into its new home at 109 North Jordan Avenue in 2001 after years of effort by students, alumni, and administration. In April 1995, the Indiana General Assembly passed a resolution to commemorate the 100th anniversary of Neal's graduation, and coinciding with the 175th anniversary of Indiana University.
