= Owen Eagleson =

New Zealand fighter pilot of WWII

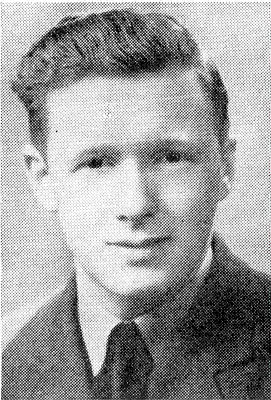
- Born: 19 December 1922; Auckland, New Zealand
- Died: 30 October 1994 (aged 71); Napier, New Zealand
- Burial place: Wharerangi Cemetery, Napier
- Military career
- Allegiance: New Zealand
- Branch: Royal New Zealand Air Force
- Rank: Flying Officer
- Nickname: 'Ginger'
- Unit: No. 486 Squadron
- Conflicts: Second World War: Operation Diver; Western Allied invasion of Germany
- Awards: Distinguished Flying Cross

Owen Eagleson DFC (19 December 1922 – 30 October 1994) was a New Zealand flying ace who served in the Royal New Zealand Air Force (RNZAF) during the Second World War. He is credited with the destruction of 20 or 21 V-1 flying bombs.

From Auckland, Eagleson joined the RNZAF in March 1942 and was sent to England to serve with the Royal Air Force (RAF) once his training was completed the following year. In November 1943, he was posted to No. 486 Squadron, which was staffed with mostly New Zealand flying personnel and operated the Hawker Typhoon fighter. Following re-equipment with the Hawker Tempest fighter the following year, the squadron was engaged in Operation Diver, the RAF's campaign against the V-1, with Eagleson being one of its most successful pilots. He was awarded the Distinguished Flying Cross in recognition of his successes. When No. 486 Squadron moved to mainland Europe, it supported the Allied advance into the Low Countries and Germany, and Eagleson destroyed some German aircraft. He was shot down on a sortie on 2 May 1945 and was briefly a prisoner of war before he escaped captivity. He returned to civilian life after the war, working as a builder. He died in 1994, aged 71.

== Early life ==
Owen Eagleson was born in Auckland, New Zealand, on 19 December 1922. He was educated at Kōwhai Intermediate School before going on to Seddon Memorial Technical College. Once he completed his education, he commenced a building apprenticeship.

== Second World War ==
Eagleson enlisted in the Royal New Zealand Air Force (RNZAF) in March 1942 and commenced his training as an airman pilot at RNZAF Station Weraroa, near Levin. Once this was completed the following year, he was sent to the United Kingdom to serve with the Royal Air Force. He spent a period of time at No. 55 Operational Training Unit at Annan. In late November 1943, Eagleson, holding the rank of flight sergeant, was posted to No. 486 Squadron.

=== Service with No. 486 Squadron ===
Eagleson's unit was a fighter squadron, with mostly New Zealand flying personnel, of the RAF's No. 11 Group which operated the Hawker Typhoon fighter from Tangmere on offensive operations to occupied Europe. As well as patrolling and attacking shipping, it also carried out air-rescue sorties and escorted fighter-bombers attacking airfields and ports. When Eagleson joined the squadron, it was starting to perform in a fighter-bomber role and, from January 1944, it was involved in strikes on V-1 flying bomb launch sites located in Pas de Calais. From March the squadron was based at Castle Camps, and the following month began converting to the Hawker Tempest fighter.

At the end of April, along with No. 3 Squadron, also equipped with Tempests, and No. 56 Squadron, No. 486 Squadron formed No. 150 Wing, operating from Newchurch on offensive operations to France. On D-Day it carried out convoy patrols over and evening patrols over the beachhead but saw no German activity, and then in the following days, carried out sweeps inland of the Normandy landing beaches.

=== Operation Diver ===
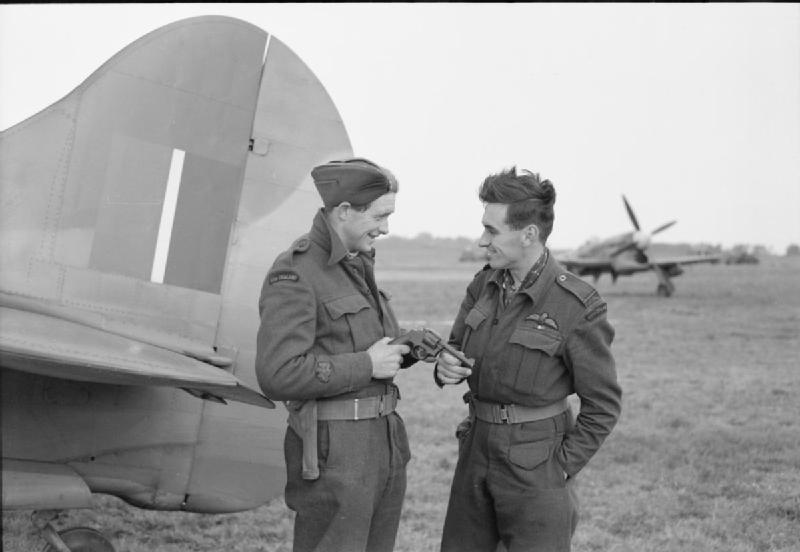
Eagleson stands on the left, next to Raymond Cammock; the two were the most successful pilots of No. 486 Squadron's campaign against V-1 flying bombs

On 13 June, the first V-1 flying bombs were launched against England from Pas de Calais and greater numbers followed over the next several days. In response, the squadron was one of those tasked with intercepting the V-1s as part of Operation Diver, the British countermeasure program to the V-1s. The Tempest, being the fastest fighter plane available to the RAF at the time, was best suited for this duty. Eagleson destroyed three V-1s in the course of two sorties on 18 June, two days after the squadron was committed to this work. One was shot down at Tonbridge, and the other two at Newchurch and near Rye. Five days later he destroyed two V-1s in separate sorties, east of Beachy Head and near Hastings respectively. On 27 June he and a pilot of No. 3 Squadron combined to shoot down a V-1 to the north of Hastings. He destroyed two more the next day. One of these was achieved without using his guns; Eagleson had unknowingly flown just ahead of a V-1 and his slipstream caused it to go out of control and crash on farmland north of Rye.

By this time Eagleson, who had been promoted to warrant officer, was becoming one of No. 486 Squadron's most successful pilots. He destroyed a V-1 on each of 3, 4, and 6 July, and two V-1s on 7 July. He shared in the destruction of a V-1 in the vicinity of Dover. Two days later he caught and shot down a V-1 just after it crossed the coastline at Eastbourne. He got so close to his target that his Tempest was burnt and both wings were perforated by shrapnel. On 27 July Eagleson destroyed a V-1 north of Ashford. Two V-1s were shot down by Eagleson in a single morning sortie on 3 August. He destroyed another the next day. Nearly two weeks later, on 15 August, he combined with another pilot to shoot down a V-1 to the west of Newchurch. Eagleson's final successes of Operation Diver were on 16 August, when he destroyed three V-1s in a single evening sortie.

According to the Official History of New Zealanders in the RAF, and aviation historian Paul Sortehaug, Eagleson ended the squadron's campaign against the V-1 flying bomb as its top scoring pilot, credited with 21 destroyed. The next most successful was Flying Officer Raymond Cammock, with 20½. However, aviation historians Christopher Shores and Clive Williams credit Eagleson with 20 V-1s destroyed.

=== Move to Europe ===
In September, No. 486 Squadron was sent to Grimbergen in Belgium to join the 2nd Tactical Air Force, where its operations were now in support of the Allied armies as they moved across the Low Countries. Operating as part of No. 122 Wing, the squadron was quickly moved to Volkel Air Base, in Holland. On 19 November, Eagleson and Flight Lieutenant Keith Taylor-Cannon engaged a Messerschmitt Me 262 jet fighter taking off from Rheine Airfield and claimed it as probably destroyed.

In November Eagleson was commissioned as a pilot officer and learned that he was to be recognised for his successes over the previous months with an award of the Distinguished Flying Cross. The official announcement was made on 8 December; the citation, published in The London Gazette, read:

Warrant Officer Eagleson has participated in a large number of sorties, involving attacks on a variety of enemy targets. He is a brave and resolute pilot, whose keenness and strong sense of duty have set a fine example. Warrant Officer Eagleson has shot down 21 flying bombs.

— London Gazette, No. 36831, 8 December 1944

=== Advance into Germany ===
Poor weather affected operations for the first weeks of 1945 but No. 486 Squadron soon began flying well into Germany to attack transportation infrastructure and seek out targets of opportunity. Eagleson damaged two Junkers Ju 52 transports on the ground near Hanover on 3 February. He was promoted to flying officer the next month. The squadron switched tactics in March; casualties in No. 122 Wing's operations against ground targets had been high and it was decided that the Tempests would now carry out wide ranging sweeps, hunting out the Luftwaffe. Eagleson caught two Fieseler Fi 156 Storch reconnaissance aircraft on the ground and damaged these. From 10 April, the squadron began moving to the Rheine Airfield near Hopsten, within Germany itself. It became operational from there on 12 April.

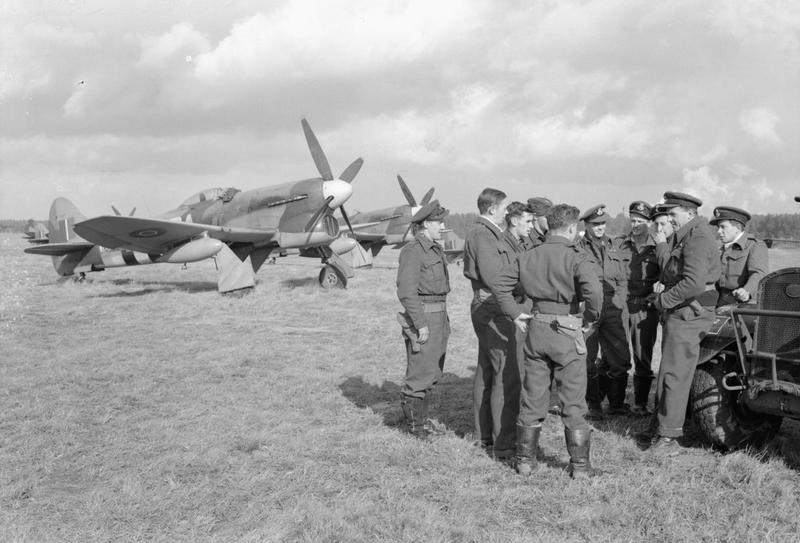
Hawker Tempests of No. 486 Squadron on an airfield in Europe, 1944

On 28 April, Eagleson was on an evening sortie with his wingman when he sighted a Junkers Ju 352 transport flying at low level. Both pilots attacked the aircraft, which crashed to the west of Plau am See. The next day he shot down a Focke Wulf 190 fighter near Lauenburg and may have damaged a second. Eagleson flew four patrols on 2 May. He destroyed a Focke-Wulf Fw 44 trainer on his first and caught and destroyed a Fi 156 Storch on the ground on his second. He carried out a strafing attack on German transport on his third patrol. On his last patrol of the day, he and his wingman sighted a train near Lübeck. Eagleson made an initial approach but his Tempest was struck by anti-aircraft fire and he was wounded in the head. He attempted to return to his airfield although the engine of his aircraft was damaged and he crash landed on farmland, still behind German lines. He was made by a prisoner of war by German soldiers who treated his wounds and placed him on a vehicle transport. The next day, the traffic column in which his vehicle was travelling was attacked by RAF fighters. During the confusion, Eagleson escaped but was recaptured.

After a night spent in custody at a farm building, he again escaped and after stealing a coat to cover his uniform, joined a column of refugees. A couple of hours later, British soldiers passed by in a jeep and Eagleson flagged them down. The soldiers, personnel of the 52nd (Lowland) Infantry Division, were lost and Eagleson was able to direct them to their headquarters where he was hosted for the night. On 4 May, he joined a party of British soldiers accepting the surrender of Generalfeldmarschall Erhard Milch. As the only air force personnel present, Milch wanted to hand over his baton to Eagleson but the British refused to allow this. Reputedly, the commander, Brigadier Derek Mills-Roberts, angered by witnessing the state of concentration camp survivors, assaulted Milch with the baton. Eagleson acquired Milch's luxury car and drove this to Faßberg Air Base, from where No. 486 Squadron had been operating since late April.

Eagleson, who had been reported missing in action, was sent to the United Kingdom on leave. While there, he visited his aunt who was very startled at his appearance. She, nor his family back in New Zealand, had not been informed that he was safe.

== Post-war period ==
Soon after the war ended, No. 486 Squadron left No. 122 Wing and moved to Kastrup in Denmark. On 19 June Eagleson, while taking part in a practice formation flying session for an airshow scheduled for the next month, lost control of his Tempest after it lost some wing panels and had to bail out over the harbour at Copenhagen, from where he was picked up. In August Eagleson was repatriated to New Zealand.

== Later life ==
Eagleson was discharged from the RNZAF in February 1946. On his return to civilian life, he became a builder. He maintained contact with his former comrades of No. 486 Squadron, and was involved in organising reunions. Unable to walk in his later years, Eagleson died on 30 October 1994 and was buried at Wharerangi Cemetery in Napier.
