= Wilson V. Eagleson =

US Army Air Force officer (1920–2006)

Wilson V. Eagleson II
- Born: Wilson Vashon Eagleson II; 1 February 1920; Cincinnati, Ohio, U.S.
- Died: 16 April 2006 (aged 86); Dudley, North Carolina, U.S.
- Resting place: Markham Memorial Gardens in Durham, North Carolina, U.S.
- Education: West Virginia State College (now West Virginia State University), Indiana University
- Occupations: Military officer; fighter pilot
- Years active: 1942–1972

Wilson Vashon "Swampy" Eagleson II (February 1, 1920 – April 16, 2006), was a United States Army Air Force officer and combat fighter pilot with the 332nd Fighter Group's 99th Fighter Squadron, best known as the Tuskegee Airmen. One of 1,007 documented Tuskegee Airmen Pilots, Eagleson was credited with two confirmed enemy German aerial kills and two probable aerial kills.

In the early 1950s, Eagleson saved the entire crew of a large U.S. Air Force cargo plane after anti-aircraft flak struck it, seriously wounding the pilots. After assuming the aircraft's controls, Eagleson safely navigated the aircraft to the Philippines. For his heroics he was awarded the Distinguished Flying Cross.

== Early life and family ==
Eagleson was born on February 1, 1920, in Cincinnati. He was a scion of the prominent Eagleson family. His father, Wilson Vashon Eagleson Sr., in 1916, became one of the first African Americans in Indiana University's Reserve Officer Training Corps program. Eagleson Sr. also became one of the U.S. Army's first African American officers. Eagleson's mother, Frances Marshall Eagleson, was Indiana University at Bloomington, Indiana's first African American woman graduate.

Eagleson's great-grandfather, family patriarch Halson V. Eagleson Sr., was a highly successful eastside Bloomington barber, founder of an African American orphanage, and incidental civil rights activist in the late 19th century/early 20th century; All of Halson V. Eagleson Sr.'s five sons attended Indiana University at Bloomington, Indiana, including Preston, Indiana University's first African American intercollegiate athlete.

Raised in Bloomington, Indiana for most of his childhood, Eagleson II and his sister lived with his maternal grandmother. His father, Wilson Vashon Eagleson Sr., became North Carolina Central University's first baseball, football, and basketball head coach. North Carolina Central University named its mascot, The Eagles, in honor of Wilson Vashon Eagleson Sr. Eagleson II's mother became North Carolina Central University's Registrar, functioning in that role for nearly a half century.

In 1933, Wilson Vashon Eagleson Sr. was killed in a car accident in West Virginia, where he taught chemistry at West Virginia State College In 1934, Eagleson II moved from Bloomington to Durham, North Carolina to live with his grieving mother. Eagleson II attended high school in Henderson, North Carolina.

After graduating from high school, Eagleson II attended West Virginia State College. In 1938, Eagleson II acquired his civilian pilot's license at West Virginia State College, the first of six historically black colleges and universities authorized by the Civil Aeronautics Authority to create an aviation program." After being denied entry into the U.S. Army Air Corps as a pilot, Eagleson II moved back to Bloomington where he attended Indiana University for a year.

On May 1, 1943, Eagleson II married Geraldine R. Thornton, a student at Tuskegee Institute. He named his P-40 Warhawk "Gerry" in honor of Geraldine. Eagleson II and Geraldine had four children: Wilson V. Eagleson III, Gerald B. Eagleson, Diedra A. Coney, and Helen F. Eagleson. They also had 15 grandchildren, 16 great-grandchildren, and 4 great-great-grandchildren. They later divorced.

== Military career ==
On January 19, 1942, the football player-built Eagleson II enlisted in the U.S. Army as an infantry soldier. After two tours at Fort Wolters, Texas as a trainee and a cadre, respectively, U.S. Army transferred Eagleson II to Fort Benning, Georgia for Officer Training School in 1942. During officer candidate school, Eagleson II's commander had a reputation for summoning officer candidates to his office, "washing them out" and reassigning them after a failed examination. One day, the commander called Eagleson II, informing Eagleson II of admittance to the Aviation Cadet program at Tuskegee Army Air Field in Tuskegee, Alabama.

On April 29, 1943, Eagleson II graduated as a member of the Single Engine Section Cadet Class SE-43-D, receiving his wings and commission as a 2nd Lieutenant. The U.S. Army Air Corps assigned Eagleson II to the 332nd Fighter Group's 99th Fighter Squadron. During his time at Tuskegee, Eagleson II developed a reputation for being a wild guy, performing various task to work off the numerous demerits he received for walking around with an untucked shirt.

In late 1943, he was assigned to the 99th Fighter Squadron as a replacement pilot in North Africa's Casablanca. During the Battle of Anzio, Italy in January 1944, the U.S. Air Corps credited Eagleson II with two confirmed enemy German aerial kills and two probable aerial kills. He flew an astounding 350 missions. On August 15, 1944, during a bomber escort mission over Southern France, Eagleson II's aircraft was struck by anti-aircraft flak near Saint-Tropez, causing it to lose coolant. Eagleson II parachuted from his severely damaged aircraft. He was rescued and driven back to Ramitelli Air Field by U.S. troops who saw Eagleson II parachute and land nearby.

After World War II, he was transferred to Tuskegee, Alabama where he assisted in the closure of Tuskegee's flight program. After leaving the military for two years, he reenlisted, working as a flight mechanic during the Korean War and the Vietnam War.

Early 1950s, Eagleson II saved the crew of an U.S. Air Force cargo plane when anti-aircraft flak struck it, seriously wounding the pilots. Assuming the controls, Eagleson II safely flew the plane to the Philippines. The U.S. Air Force awarded Eagleson II the Distinguished Flying Cross for his heroics.

In February 1972, Eagleson II retired from the military.

=== Unit assignments ===
- 1942–1942, US Army (USA), Ft. Walters, TX; Ft. Benning, GA
- 1942–1943, AAF MOS 770, Aviation Cadet Flight School, Tuskegee AAF
- 1943–1943, AAF MOS 1055, 33rd Fighter Group, Licata, Termini, & Barcellona Airfields, Sicily
- 1943–1944, AAF MOS 1055, 79th Fighter Group, Salsola, Madna, & Capodichino Airfields
- 1943–1945, AAF MOS 1055, 99th Fighter Squadron, several
- 1943–1945, United States Army Air Corps (USAAC)
- 1944–1944, AAF MOS 1055, 324th Fighter Group, Cercola & Pignataro Airfields
- 1944–1945, AAF MOS 1055, 332nd Fighter Group, Ciampino, Orbetello, & Ramitelli Airfields

=== Commendations and awards ===
- Distinguished Flying Cross
- Air Medal with six oak leaf clusters
- Purple Heart with an oak leaf cluster
- Purple Heart
- Red Star of Yugoslavia
- Korean Service Medal
- Vietnam Service Medal
- Campaign Medals

== Later life and death ==
Eagleson moved to New York where he raised horses and golden retrievers on his family farm. He later relocated to Goldsboro, North Carolina where he worked at Belk's men's clothing department. Eagleson died on April 16, 2006, in Dudley, North Carolina, at the age of 86. He was interred at Markham Memorial Gardens in Durham, North Carolina.

== Honors ==
- The Seymour Johnson Air Force Base's Tuskegee Airmen chapter in Goldsboro, North Carolina—Wilson V. Eagleson Chapter, Tuskegee Airmen, Inc. is named in honor of Eagleson II.
- The Smithsonian Institution displays some of Eagleson II's World War II memorabilia.

== See also ==
- Executive Order 9981
- List of Tuskegee Airmen
- List of Tuskegee Airmen Cadet Pilot Graduation Classes
- Military history of African Americans
