= No. 224 Squadron RAF =

Defunct flying squadron of the Royal Air Force

- Active: 1 April 1918 – May 1919; 1 February 1937 – 31 October 1966
- Country: United Kingdom
- Motto(s): Fedele all'amico (Italian: Faithful to a friend)

No. 224 Squadron RAF was a Royal Air Force squadron that saw service in both the First and Second World Wars.

== History ==
=== First World War ===
It was formed on 1 April 1918, at Alimini, Italy from part of No. 6 Wing RNAS, equipped with the de Havilland DH.4. In June 1918 it re-equipped with the de Havilland DH.9. It carried out attacks against Austro-Hungarian targets in Montenegro and Albania, and on 2 October 1918, took part in an aerial bombardment of Durazzo, Albania in support of a naval attack on that port. The squadron disbanded at Taranto on 15 May 1919.

=== Reformation ===
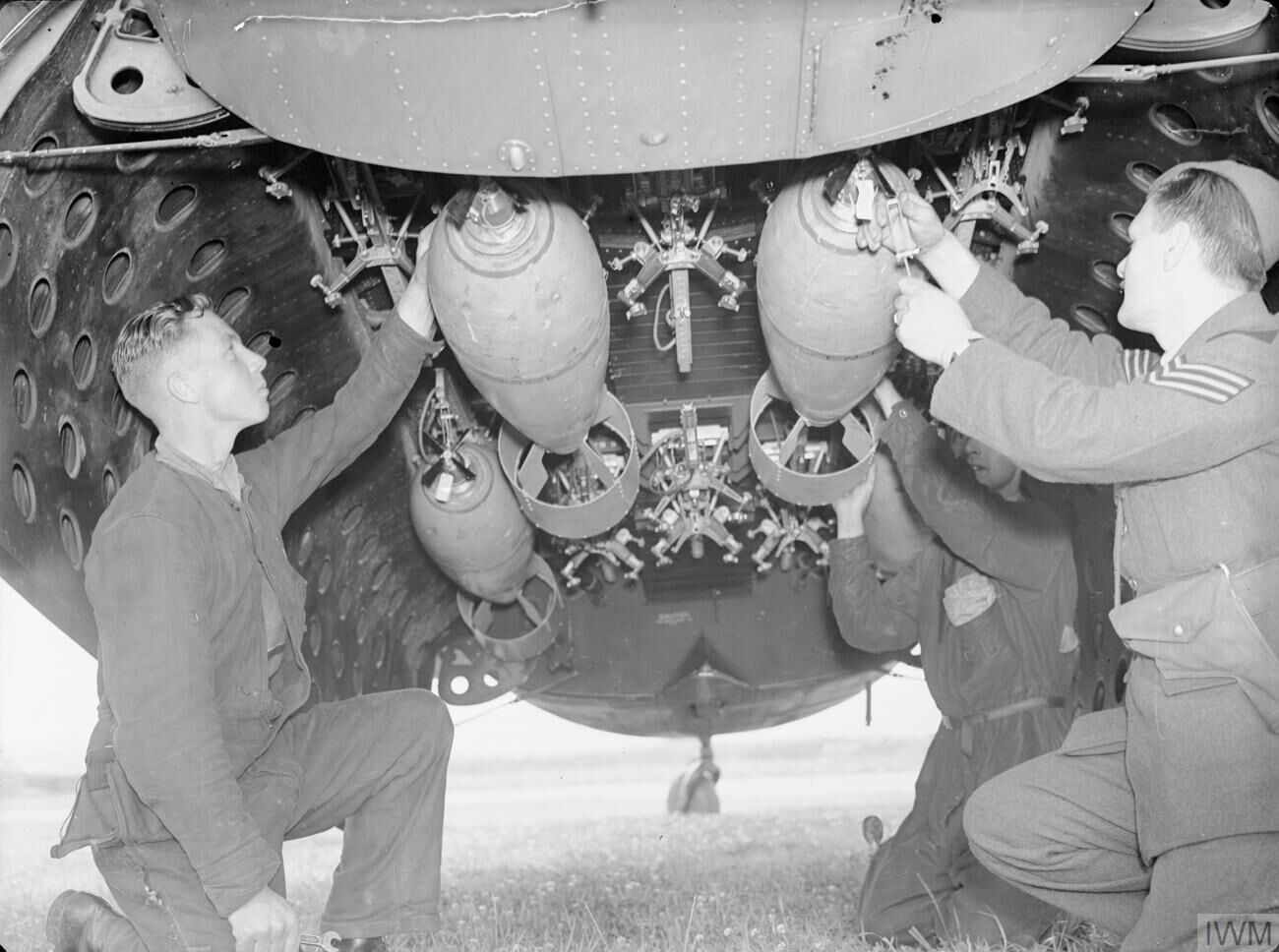
Securing bombs in a 224 Squadron Hudson at RAF Leuchars

On 1 February 1937, the squadron reformed at Manston as a General Reconnaissance squadron, (Note: In RAF parlance, General Reconnaissance stood for Maritime reconnaissance.) with personnel from No. 48 Squadron. It then moved to Boscombe Down where it received Avro Anson aircraft. The squadron moved to RAF Thornaby in Yorkshire in July 1937. In August 1938 the squadron moved to Leuchars in Scotland, and from May 1939 began re-equipping with the Lockheed Hudson, becoming the first RAF squadron to operate the American reconnaissance bomber, becoming operational in August that year.

=== Second World War ===
On the outbreak of the Second World War, the squadron deployed its Hudsons on patrols over the North Sea and reconnaissance missions over German ports, losing three aircraft by the end of September 1939. On 8 October 1939 three of its Hudsons shot down a German Dornier Do 18 flying boat, the first enemy aircraft claimed shot down by the RAF in the Second World War. The German invasion of Norway in April 1940 saw the squadron's Hudsons carry out bombing operations against harbours and shipping, with operations off the coast of Norway continuing after the Norway's occupation.

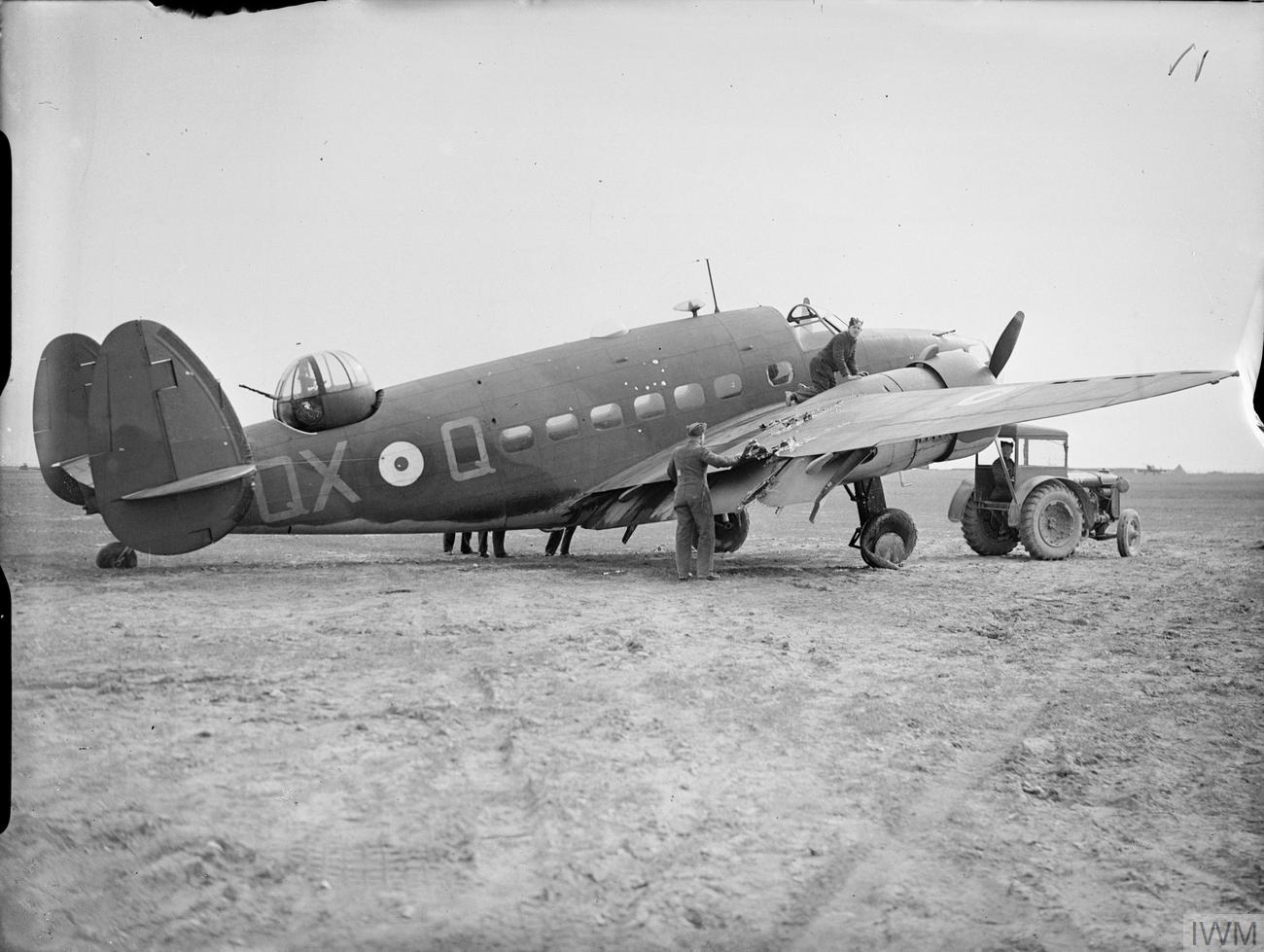
Lockheed Hudson N7264, 'QX-Q' of 224 Squadron, at RAF Wick, being examined for damage due to 'friendly fire' off Norway, April 1940. Note punctured tyres.

On 23 April 1940 a 'most regrettable incident' occurred whereby three Hudsons, sent to support Operation Primrose (1940), were engaged by anti-aircraft guns from HMS Curacoa (D41) and others. Hudson N7249 was shot down, whilst the other two aircraft, including N7264, returned to RAF Wick with damage.

On 27 December 1940, one of the squadron's Hudsons sank the merchant ship Arnfinn Jarl off Egersund, and on 4 January 1941, had another anti-shipping success, sinking the merchant ship Snyg south east of Haugesund.

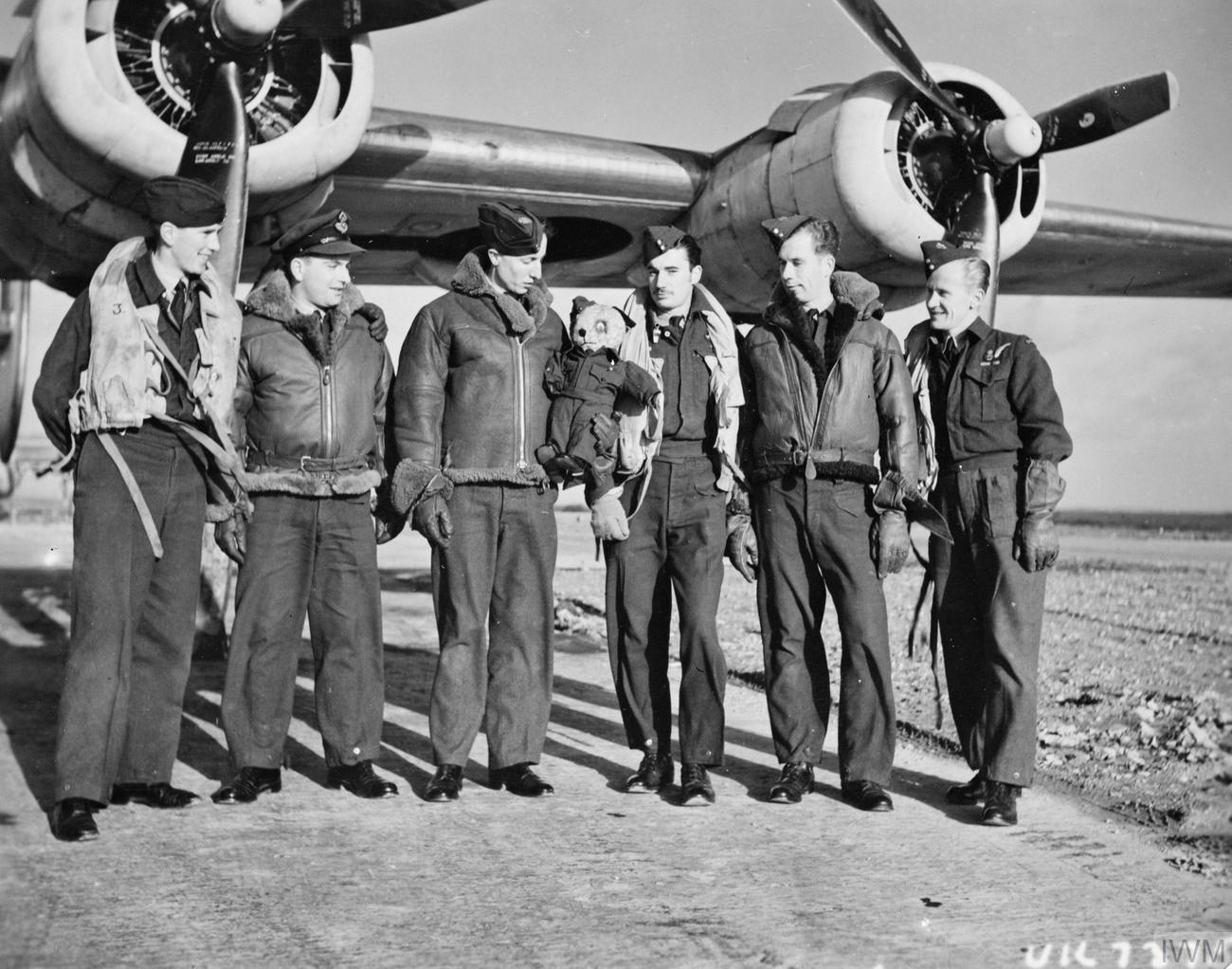
224 Squadron Liberator crew at RAF St Eval after sinking two U-boats on a single sortie, June 1944

The squadron moved to Limavady in April 1941, and St Eval in December 1941. In February 1942 it returned to Limavady and moved to Tiree in April 1942 where it converted to Consolidated Liberators. In September 1942 the squadron moved; first to Beaulieu, then St Eval in April 1943, and Milltown, Scotland in September 1944. 224 Squadron was a successful anti-submarine unit, accounting for ten U-boats destroyed during the Second World War. Its wartime commanders included New Zealanders A. E. Clouston and Mick Ensor. The squadron returned to St Eval in July 1945 where it converted to Avro Lancasters in October 1946. The squadron disbanded on 10 November 1947.

The squadron reformed on 1 March 1948 at RAF Aldergrove, equipped with the Handley Page Halifax. In 1951 it re-equipped with the Avro Shackleton, which it operated from RAF Gibraltar from August 1951, until disbanding on 31 October 1966. During this period its main tasks were NATO maritime surveillance as well as search and rescue duties within the Gibraltar Maritime Area. This area covered a large part of the eastern Atlantic as well as the western Mediterranean.

== Aircraft operated ==
- 1918-1919 Airco DH.4
- 1918-1919 Airco DH.9
- 1918 Sopwith Camel
- 1937-1939 Avro Anson I
- 1939-1941 Lockheed Hudson I
- 1941-1942 Lockheed Hudson III and V
- 1942-1943 Consolidated Liberator II & III
- 1943-1944 Consolidated Liberator V
- 1944-1945 Consolidated Liberator VI
- 1945-1946 Consolidated Liberator VIII
- 1946-1947 Avro Lancaster GR3
- 1948-1952 Handley Page Halifax GR6
- 1951-1954 Avro Shackleton MR1
- 1953-1966 Avro Shackleton MR2
