= D. V. Peyton-Ward =

English Royal Navy officer

Captain D. V. Peyton-Ward CBE
- Born: 8 October 1893; Kensington, London
- Died: 6 July 1976; Plymouth, Devon, England
- Military career
- Allegiance: United Kingdom
- Branch: Royal Navy
- Rank: Acting Captain
- Awards: Commander of the Order of the British Empire; Legion of Merit
- Other work: Author and Historian

Dudley Vivian Peyton-Ward CBE (8 October 1893 – 6 July 1976) was a Royal Navy officer who served in both the First World War and during and after the Second World War.

== Life ==
Peyton-Ward was best known for his work as Naval Liaison Officer to RAF Coastal Command. The work he performed in this capacity was of utmost importance to the smooth functioning of Coastal Command operations, tactics and weapons (see: Coastal Command weapon development. Among other things, he personally championed and facilitated the increased use of Very Long Range aircraft, such as the Consolidated B-24 Liberator. These aircraft allowed continual air cover over the Atlantic and closed the notorious Mid-Atlantic gap, where Axis U-boats could freely operate against Allied convoys.

It was said of him that he was the only person of lower than Air Marshal rank whose portrait appeared in the mess at Coastal Command.

After the war he wrote an eight-volume internal history for the Royal Navy, entitled The R.A.F. in the Maritime War, a copy of which resides at The National Archives in Kew, London. The preface to the British Official history of the RAF in the Second World (a supplemental work to the History of the Second World War) says "Our debt is especially heavy to the Air Historical Branch: to its narrators—among them Captain D. V. Peyton-Ward, C.B.E., R.N. (retd.), perhaps more than any".

== Life ==
In May 1914 he was his sub-Lieutenancy was confirmed. While a Lieutenant he was mentioned in dispatches in 1917 for "recognition of their services in submarines in enemy waters" during the First World War.

In 1944, he was named as a Commander of the Order of the British Empire. After the war he was named officer of the American Legion of Merit for his contribution to the Allied cause during the war.
