= Hubert Mack Thaxton =

African American physicist (1909–1974)

- Born: 20 March 1909; Lynchburg, Virginia
- Died: 3 January 1974 (aged 64)
- Education: Howard University, B.S., M.S. University of Wisconsin-Madison, M.A., PhD
- Scientific career
- Fields: Nuclear physics, proton scattering
- Workplaces: North Carolina A&T State University; Delaware State University; City College of New York
- Thesis: "Scattering of Protons by Protons" (1938)
- Doctoral advisor: Gregory Breit

Hubert Mack Thaxton (20 March 1909 – 3 January 1974) was an American nuclear physicist, mathematician, engineer, and the fourth African American person to earn a PhD in physics in the United States. Thaxton's research focused on proton scattering, which at the time was a largely unexplored area of study.

== Early life and education ==
Hubert Mack Thaxton was born in Lynchburg, Virginia, on 20 March 1909, to Henry Thaxton and Sarah Jamison. He attended Dunbar High School in Lynchburg, which was then the segregated high school for Black students in the district. The school desegregated in 1962, and eventually transitioned to the Paul Laurence Dunbar Middle School for Innovation. Thaxton graduated from Dunbar in 1927.

Thaxton attended Howard University in Washington, D.C., for his undergraduate degree, and graduated with B.S. degrees in physics, mathematics, and chemistry in 1931. In 1933 he also earned M.S. degrees in physics and mathematics from Howard.

He then went on to pursue further graduate studies at the University of Wisconsin–Madison. He received his first degree there in 1936, earning an M.A. in mathematics. Thaxton then went on to pursue his PhD in physics at Wisconsin, where he studied nuclear physics under theoretical nuclear physicist Gregory Breit. His thesis focused on the splitting of protons with protons, and was titled "Scattering of protons by protons."

Thaxton earned his doctoral degree in 1938, making him the fourth African American person in the United States to earn a PhD in physics. Thaxton was preceded by Dr. John McNeile Hunter (Cornell University, 1937), and followed by Dr. Herman Branson (University of Cincinnati, 1939) and Dr. Halson V. Eagleson (Indiana University Bloomington, 1939).

== Career ==
Thaxton began his career at North Carolina A&T State University, where he was a professor and a chair of the physics department. After a verbal altercation with the president of the university, Thaxton began teaching at Delaware State College (now Delaware State University) in 1944. There, he served as a professor and chair of the mathematics department. In 1946 he joined the faculty of Walter Hervey Junior College in New York, New York, where he again served as a professor and chair of the physics department. He remained at Walter Hervey for about two years.

Starting in 1946, he also began teaching at the City College of New York, working as an instructor of evening mathematics courses. In 1971 he was appointed a full-time faculty member in the mathematics department, but his subsequent applications for tenure were denied. Thaxton took the matter to court, and a lengthy legal battle ensued over the matter of racial discrimination. He eventually won two of the cases against the City College administration, but passed away before the issue could be fully resolved and his tenure put into practice.

From 1947 to 1971, Thaxton also held appointments in industry and in the private sector. Among the positions he held were as project engineer in charge of radar systems and radio and TV antenna systems at Sperry Gyroscope, Long Island, New York; chief engineer in charge of research and development of color television receivers and transmitters at Sylvania Electric; project engineer for the design of special purpose jet aircraft at the Curtiss-Wright Corporation; and director of the digital computer facility at the Kollsman Instrument Company. Some of this work included classified government contracting, and much of his work remained secret during his career. Some of his projects included work on atomic processes and long-range radar.

He also participated in professional organizations including the American Physical Society, the American Mathematical Society, and the American Association for the Advancement of Science, as well as in many community organizations in New York City. He was president of the Harlem Engineering Corporation, Three R Schools Incorporation, and the Harlem Political Club, and was director of the Sloan Foundation Computer-Space Science Center in Harlem.

== Personal life ==
Thaxton married Lydia Richardson of Greensboro, North Carolina, in 1941. They had two daughters.

== Publications ==
Over his career, Thaxton published more than 200 works, though many of the technical reports remain classified. He published and conducted research with multiple Nobel prize winners over his career, including Hans Bethe; Donald William Kerst, with whom he worked on betatron; Ernest Lawrence, with whom he worked on the cyclotron; Eugene Wigner, with whom he worked on quantum statistics; and Sir Arthur Eddington with whom he worked on proton-proton scattering related to a theory of stellar structure.

- Thaxton, Hubert M. and Eddington, Arthur, "Proton Scattering," Physica 7 (1940), pages 122–124.
- Thaxton, Hubert M.; Breit, Gregory, and Kittel, C., "p-Wave Anomlies in Proton-Proton Scattering," Physical Review 57 (1940), pages 255–259.
- Thaxton, Hubert M.; Breit, Gregory, and Eisenbud, L. "Analysis of Experiments on Scattering of Protons by Protons," Physical Reviews 44 (1939), pages 1018–1064.
- Thaxton, Hubert M.; Keitel, C. "Phase Shift Calculations for Proton-Proton Scattering at High Energies," Physical Review (1939)

== Legacy ==
Thaxton is the namesake of the Hubert Mack Thaxton Fellowship at the University of Wisconsin. The fellowship provides financial support for undergraduate physics students.
