= Frances Marshall Eagleson =

American educator, education administrator (1898–1987)

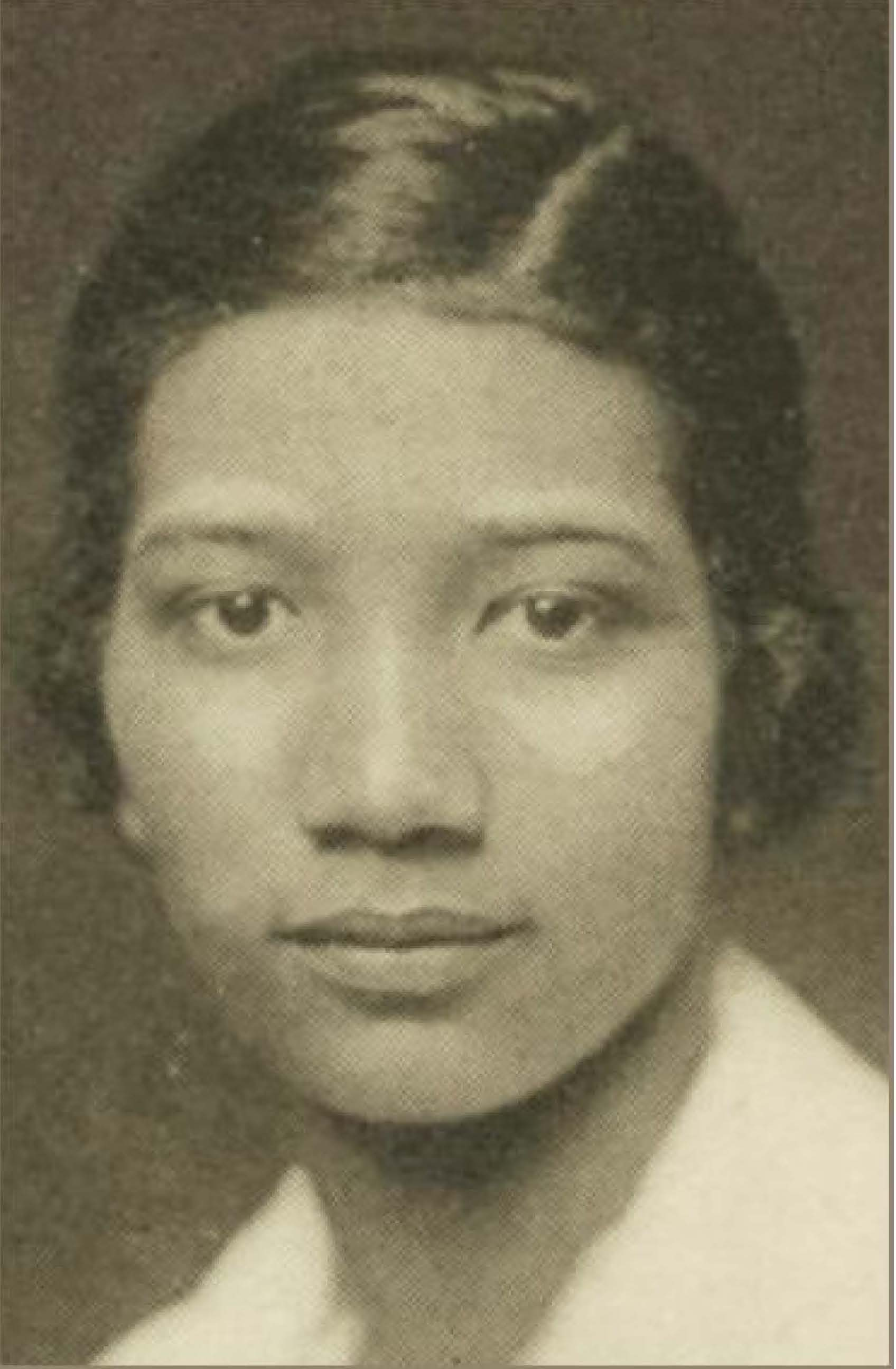
- Born: July 17, 1898; Elizabeth, Kentucky, U.S.
- Died: May 18, 1987 (aged 88); Hampton, Virginia, U.S.
- Education: Indiana University
- Spouse: Vashon Eagleson
- Children: Wilson V. Eagleson
- Relatives: Halson V. Eagleson

Frances Marshall Eagleson (July 17, 1898 – May 18, 1987) was an American education administrator and the first Black woman to graduate from Indiana University in Bloomington, Indiana.

== Early life and education ==
Frances Marshall was born in Elizabeth, Kentucky, on July 17, 1898, and raised in Rushville, Indiana. Her father, Clinton B. Marshall, was a brick mason, and her mother was a homemaker.

Marshall was the only "colored" student in her graduating class at Rushville High School in 1915. She enrolled at Indiana University in the fall of 1915, following the recommendation of her high school principal. At this time, Black students were not allowed to live on campus. Marshall initially lived with the Evans family, who had previously provided housing for Black students matriculating at the university. She was later able to subsidize the cost of her education by living with limestone executive Hiram P. Ridley and his family, where she cooked and cleaned in exchange for room and board. Tuition at the time was a $7.50 per semester contingency fee and a $1.50 per semester library fee for Indiana residents.

As a student, Marshall spent her free time and had social activities on the west side of Bloomington, where much of the city's African American population lived. There, she attended church, took in movies, and attended events help by Kappa Alpha Psi, a historically African American fraternity that had established an Indiana chapter for Black students in 1911. She described the atmosphere on campus as mostly segregated, with no interaction between Black and white students.

Marshall graduated in 1919 with an associate degree in English and a teaching certificate. Upon her graduation, she became the first Black woman to graduate from Indiana University.

== Career ==
Marshall began her career with a brief period teaching in Cincinnati, Ohio, before moving on to teach at Edward Waters College in Jacksonville, Florida.

After a year of teaching in Florida she began teaching English at what is now North Carolina Central College at Durham, North Carolina, in 1921. The college was previously a private high school for Black students called the National Training School at the time of Marshall's hiring. The college went through multiple names and administrative iterations during Marshall's career, as the Durham State Normal School for Negroes (1923–1925); the North Carolina College for Negroes (1925–1947); and finally, North Carolina Central College at Durham (1947–1969); before taking its current name. She spent most of her career at North Carolina Central College, which is a historically Black college.

During her career, she also went on to earn a graduate degree in educational administration from the University of Chicago and Columbia. Eventually working as a registrar and admissions officer for North Carolina Central University from 1928 to retirement in 1964 (Currently has co-ed dormitory named in her honor - Eagleson Hall). After retirement, Marshall worked as the registrar for two other colleges: Florida Memorial College in St. Augustine, Florida, and Spelman College in Atlanta, Georgia.

After retiring from her post at Spelman, Eagleson lived with her daughter in Hampton until her death on May 18, 1987. Eagleson remained active in the Indiana University alumni category, mentoring and housing students.

== Personal life and family ==
She was married to Vashon Eagleson (1898–1933), another Indiana University graduate who taught chemistry and coached football at North Carolina Central University. The couple had met at Indiana while Eagleson was living in the campus Army barracks. Eagleson was the son of Preston Eagleson (1876–1911) became the first African American intercollegiate athlete at Indiana University, the second Black student to receive a degree, and the first Black student to earn a master's degree from the university.

They were the parents of 2nd Lt. Wilson V. Eagleson II, a fighter pilot who flew with the Tuskegee Airmen's 99th and 32nd Pursuit Squadron during the Second World War. Their daughter is Rosalind M. Exum, who became an associate professor of mathematics at Hampton Institute in Hampton, Virginia.

== Legacy ==
She has been honored by Indiana University beside Marcellus Neal for their scholastic and social achievements. The Neal-Marshall Alumni Club was founded in 1981 as a means of meeting the needs of Black students, faculty, and staff, while also promoting African-American history at Indiana University. The organization was actually founded in Jackson, Mississippi, but Indiana chapters soon followed in Gary and Indianapolis. The Neal-Marshall Black Culture Center opened on the Indiana University campus in 1969. The center was originally called the "Black House," but renamed the Black Culture Center in 1972. The center was located in various buildings on campus, but moved into its new home at 275, previously 109, North Jordan Avenue in 2001 after years of effort by students, alumni, and administration. In January 2002, the NMBCC was officially dedicated to Marcellus Neal and Frances Marshall, who were respectively the first African American man and woman to graduate from Indiana University.

"When I said I was going to college, people thought I was crazy," she said. "It was unusual for a woman to go to college, especially a black woman."
