= Vashon Eagleson =

American football coach, professor (1898–1933)

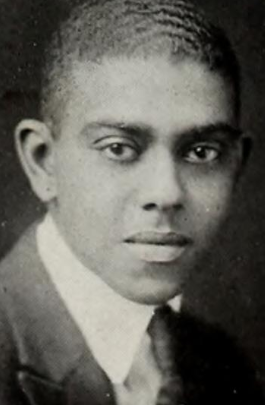
- Eagleson pictured in Arbutus 1920, Indiana University yearbook

Biographical details
- Born: March 4, 1898; Bloomington, Indiana, U.S.
- Died: March 10, 1933 (aged 35) near Beckley, West Virginia, U.S.

Coaching career (HC unless noted)
- 1923–1926: North Carolina Central

Head coaching record
- Overall: 4–10–1

Wilson Vashon Eagleson (March 4, 1898 – March 10, 1933) was an American college football coach and professor. He was as the first head football coach at the North Carolina College for Negroes—now known as North Carolina Central University—in Durham, North Carolina, serving or four seasons, from 1923 to 1926, compiling a record of 4–10–1.

Eagleson earned a degree in chemistry from Indiana University Bloomington in 1922. He was married to Frances Marshall Eagleson (1898–1987), an educator who also graduated from Indiana. Eagleson was later an associate professor of chemistry at West Virginia State College—now known as West Virginia State University. He was killed in an automobile accident, on March 10, 1933, near Beckley, West Virginia.

== Head coaching record ==
=== Football ===
Year	Team	Overall	Conference	Standing	Bowl/playoffs
North Carolina College Eagles (Independent) (1923–1926)
1923	North Carolina College	0–1			
1924	North Carolina College	4–2–1			
1925	North Carolina College	0–5			
1926	North Carolina College	0–2			
North Carolina College:		4–10–1			
Total:		4–10–1			
