= RNZAF Station Weraroa =

Royal New Zealand Air Force station, 1939–1944

RNZAF Levin RNZAF Weraroa
- Near Levin, Horowhenua District in New Zealand

Site information
- Type: RNZAF Ground Station and Landing Ground
- Operator: Royal New Zealand Air Force

Location
- Coordinates: 40°39′14.4″S 175°16′15.1″E

Site history
- Built: 1939
- In use: 1939–1944

Garrison information
- Past commanders: Wing Commander Ronald Sinclair; Air Commodore Trevor White; Wing Commander F.R. Dix; Wing Commander Arthur Upham

RNZAF Station Weraroa was a Royal New Zealand Air Force station located southeast of Levin, 44 km southwest of Palmerston North, New Zealand. Originally established on Kimberley Rd in 1935 as a small local airstrip, it was commandeered as an air force base by the RNZAF at the outbreak of the Second World War in 1939.

Weraroa was made up of two distinct sections, namely the airfield on the northern end of the site, along with a ground training station located on the former site of a Government Research Farm.

Airmen knew the place by both names of Levin and Weraroa. Ground radar operators, pilots, and crew were trained there and although uniformed as RNZAF or WAAFs they did not come under Air Force control.

== World War II ==
=== Stationed Units ===
- Initial Training Wing – conducted basic military training for recruits. This unit was based in Levin from 1939 to February 1942.
- No. 1 (Bomber) Operational Training Unit trained pilots for the Lockheed Hudson reconnaissance and bomber aircraft.
- No. 10 (Bomber) Operational Training Unit – trained pilots for the Lockheed Hudson reconnaissance and bomber aircraft.
- Officers' School of Instruction – This moved back from Omaka to Levin when the South Island base had closed down in April 1944 when sufficient accommodation had become available

== Postwar ==
In the late 1940s, the site became the Kimberley Colony for Mental Defectives, later renamed the Kimberley Hospital and Training Centre. It was closed in 2006. Little remains of the current site today. The runways have been turned back into farmland, while the Speldhurst Country Estate has largely been developed over the training station. However, as of early 2021, several buildings remain on the East of the site.
