= 303 Squadron (film) =

2018 Polish film by Denis Delić

- Official poster
- Directed by: Denis Delić
- Screenplay by: Jacek Samojłowicz; Krzysztof Burdza; Tomasz Kępski
- Based on: Squadron 303 by Arkady Fiedler
- Produced by: Jacek Samojłowicz
- Starring: Maciej Zakościelny; Piotr Adamczyk; Cara Theobold; Antoni Królikowski; Andrew Woodall
- Cinematography: Waldemar Szmidt
- Edited by: Peter Devaney Flanagan; Marcin Bastkowski
- Music by: Łukasz Pieprzyk
- Production company: Film Media
- Distributed by: Mówi Serwis
- Release date: 31 August 2018
- Running time: 99 minutes
- Country: Poland
- Languages: Polish; English; German; French

303 Squadron (Polish: Dywizjon 303. Historia prawdziwa, lit. 'No. 303 Squadron. The True Story') is a 2018 biographical war film directed by Denis Delić, written by Jacek Samojłowicz, Krzysztof Burdza and Tomasz Kępski, and produced by Samojłowicz. It was produced by Film Media in Poland, and distributed by Mówi Serwis. It features the dialogue in Polish, English, German, and French. The film was based on the 1942 non-fiction book Squadron 303 by Arkady Fiedler. It depicts the history of the members of the No. 303 Squadron, a Polish air unit of the Royal Air Force, which fought in the Battle of Britain, during the Second World War. The film premiered on 31 August 2018.

== Plot ==
In 1940, during the Second World War, following the Invasion of Poland, and the Fall of France, the pilots of the Polish Air Force escape to the United Kingdom, where they join the Royal Air Force. They become members of newly formed No. 303 Squadron, a Polish air unit, which participates in the Battle of Britain against the German Air Force. Initially, the British officers are reluctant towards Polish pilots. However, they gradually win them over with their successes in the fight. The movie predominantly focuses the squadron commander Witold Urbanowicz, and pilot Jan Zumbach.

== Cast ==
- Piotr Adamczyk as Witold Urbanowicz
- Maciej Zakościelny as Jan Zumbach
- Cara Theobold as Victoria Brown
- Antoni Królikowski as Witold Łokuciewski
- Andrew Woodall as Thomas Jones
- Anna Prus as Jagoda Kochan
- Krzysztof Kwiatkowski as Mirosław Ferić
- John Kay Steel as Stanley Vincent
- Jan Wieczorkowski as Ludwik Witold Paszkiewicz
- Marcin Kwaśny as John A. Kent
- Steffen Mennekes as Hermann von Oste
- Piotr Witkowski as Rudolf Knage
- Kirk Barker as Athol Forbes
- Maciej Cymorek as Josef František
- Sławomir Mandes as Tadeusz Andruszków
- Tomasz Mandes as Leopold Pamuła
- Nikodem Rozbicki as Stanisław Karubin
- Wacław Warchoł as Zdzisław Henneberg
- Aleksander Wróbel as Jan Daszewski
- Hubert Miłkowski as Kazimierz Wünsche
- Maciej Marczewski as Zdzisław Krasnodębski
- Robert Czebotar as engineer Kochan
- Jamie Hinde as king George VI
- Jacek Samojłowicz as Hermann Göring
- Krzysztof Franieczek as Lützow
- Wenanty Nosul as Ansell
- Krzysztof Rurka as Arkady Fiedler

== Production and release ==
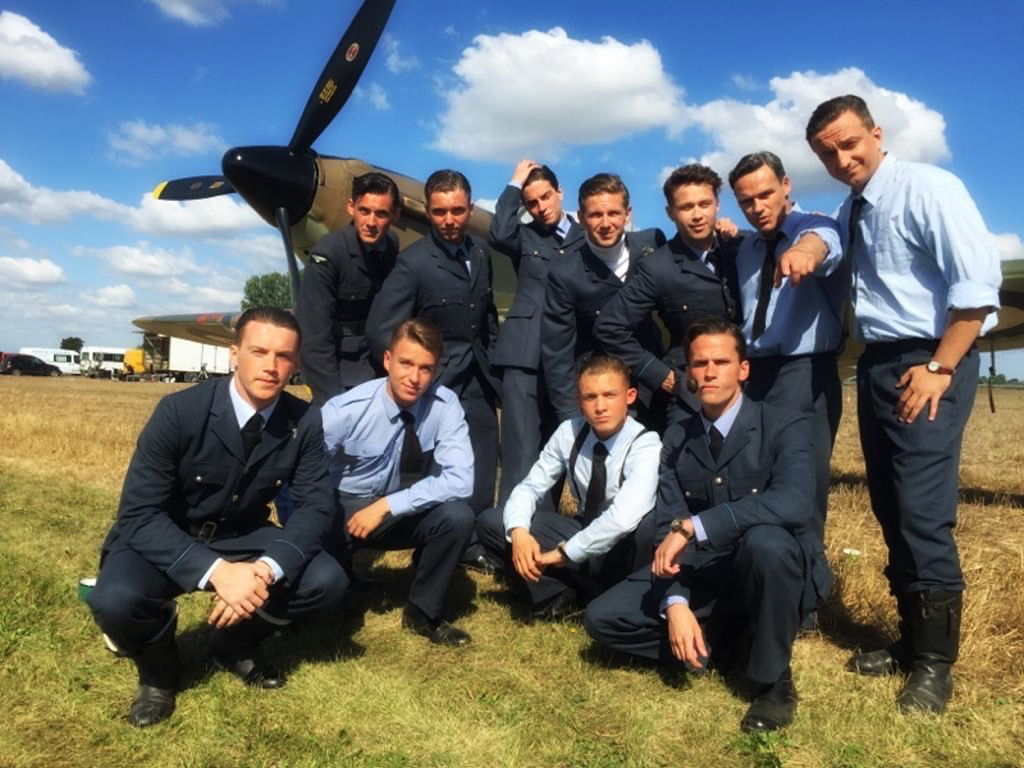
The members of the cast at the film set.

The film was based on the 1942 non-fiction book Squadron 303 by Arkady Fiedler. It depicted the history of the members of the No. 303 Squadron, a Polish squadron of the Royal Air Force, which fought in the Battle of Britain, during the Second World War. The film was directed by Denis Delić, and written by Jacek Samojłowicz, Krzysztof Burdza and Tomasz Kępski, and produced by Samojłowicz. Małgorzata Czyżycka was the executive producer. The cinematography was done by Waldemar Szmidt, the sound by Bartosz Putkiewicz, the scenography by Marian Zawaliński, the costumes by Małgorzata Skorupa, and the editing by Peter Devaney Flanagan and Marcin Bastkowski.

The preparations for production began in February 2016. The filming began on 10 August 2016 and lasted until 17 October 2017. It was produced by Film Media in Poland and United Kingdom, and distributed by Mówi Serwis. The scenes were filmed in Poland, in Drwalew, Konstancin-Jeziorna, Obory, Warsaw (Warsaw University of Life Sciences and Sabat Theatre), and Kraków (Polish Aviation Museum). Originally, the film was set to be directed by Łukasz Palkowski, who however abandoned it before the begging of production, to direct 2017 biographical film Breaking the Limits instead. He was replaced by Wiesław Saniewski, who however suffered a heat stroke at the film set a few days into the production, and had to go to the hospital, being replaced by Denis Delić.

Several Hawker Hurricane Mk.XII, and de Havilland Tiger Moth aricraft were rented for the production. Two replicas of Hawker Hurricane planes were also made. After the end of the filming, they were donated to the No. 303 Squadron Museum in the village of Napoleon, in Silesian Voivodeship, Poland, and the Arkady Fiedler Museum in the town of Puszczykowo in Greater Poland Voivodeship, Poland.

The film was promoted with the song "Tylko Ty" by Edyta Górniak, which was released on 27 August 2018. 303 Squadron premiered on 31 August 2018.

== Reception ==
The film received mixed to negative reviews from critics. On the Review-aggregation website Mediakrytyk.pl, 34.5% of 36 reviews are positive, with an average rating of 5.1/10. The reviewers generally praised the aerial combat sequences, visual presentation, and CGI and special effects, while criticising the screenplay for its dramatic structure and lack of sufficient emotional impact, and the characters whom have been seen as acting unnaturally. The film was also seen as having an overly conservative and patriotic tone, and the dialogue have been described as overly-pompous and sanitised, and the plot as simplistic and overly "safe".

The film received awards at the Fly Film Festival, NNW International Film Festival, and Polish Film Festival in America. It was also nominated to the Polish Film Award in the best sound category, for Bartosz Putkiewicz. The film was also presented with the Snake Award, an annual mocking award for worst Polish films, in the categories for Embarrassing Film About Important Topic, the Special Care Effect for the worst filmmaking mistake, the worst poster, and the worst music video for Edyta Górniak. It was also nominated for the worst director.

== Controversies ==
During the production of 303 Squadron, another film based on the history of the No. 303 Squadron, titled Hurricane, was created in the United Kingdom by the companies Lipsync Productions, Prospect 3, and Stray Dog Films. It was produced by Krystian Kozlowski and Matthew Whyte, and directed David Blair. The premier of the British production in Poland was set on 17 August 2018, before 303 Squadron which was set to premier on 31 August 2018. This is criticised by the creators of the Polish film, with its distributor, Mówi Serwis, accusing the British production of trying to confuse audiences by releasing their film at the same time. Hurricane was distributed in Poland by Kino Świat, which was originally set to distribute 303 Squadron, before dropping it, accusing the product of not being historically accurate. To promote the film as more accrete story, and the original idea, 303 Squadron was released in Poland under the name Dywizjon 303. Historia prawdziwa (lit. 'No. 303 Squadron. The True Story'), as opposed to its originally planned name, which was simply Dywizjon 303 (lit. 'No. 303 Squadron'). Additionally, some posters of the film features text, which, when translated, read: "Do not mistake the film; the true story of the No. 303 Squadron, based on Arkady Fiedler's book, premieres on 31 August". The action have been critisized and riduculed by some on the internet, as the annotation on the film seemed to paint it as the "definite" and "correct" reteling, as opposed to Hurricane. The film poster was presented with the Snake Award, an annual mocking award for worst movies in Poland, in the category for the worst poster.

During the production, the producer and co-writer Jacek Samojłowicz came into the disagreemed with sons of Arkady Fiedler, the author of the book on which the movie was based, Arkady Radosław Fiedler and Marek Fiedler, over the story. They later came into the agreement. The families of Polish aviators also disagreed over the depictions of the pilots engaging partying and drinking in the bars, wanting to have them depicted only in heroic maner.

== Accolades ==
Accolades received by 303 Squadron
Award	Year	Category	Recipient	Result	Ref.
The Eagles Polish Film Awards	2019	Best Sound	Bartosz Putkiewicz	Nominated	
Fly Film Festival	2018	Grand Prix	303 Squadron	Won	
NNW International Film Festival	2018	Door to Freedom	303 Squadron	Won	
Polish Film Festival in America	2018	Audience Award	303 Squadron	Won	
Snake Awards	2019	Embarrassing Film About Important Topic	303 Squadron	Won	
Snake Awards	2019	Special Care Effect (worst filming mistake)	303 Squadron	Won	
Snake Awards	2019	Worst Poster	303 Squadron	Won	
Snake Awards	2019	Worst Music Video	Edyta Górniak for "Tylko Ty"	Won	
Snake Awards	2019	Worst Director	Denis Delić	Nominated	
Strażnik Pamięci	2018	—N/a	Denis Delić	Nominated	
Złoty Bilet	2019	—N/a	303 Squadron	Won	
