= Tadeusz Arentowicz =

Polish World War II flying ace

- Tadeusz Arentowicz during WWII
- Born: 19 September 1909; Sierpc, Russian Empire
- Died: 8 July 1941 (aged 31); English Channel, off Dunkirk, France
- Military career
- Allegiance: Poland; United Kingdom
- Branch: Polish Air Force; Royal Air Force
- Service years: 1933–1941
- Rank: Flight lieutenant
- Nickname: "Szpak" ('Starling' in English)
- Service number: P-0251
- Units: Aviation Training Center No. 1; No. 65 Squadron RAF; 303 Squadron
- Commands: 303 Squadron (1941)
- Conflicts: World War II
- Awards: Aviator badge; Polish Cross of Valour; Air Medal (Poland)

Tadeusz Arentowicz (19 September 1909 – 8 July 1941) was a Polish fighter pilot and ace during the Second World War. He served as a flight lieutenant in the Royal Air Force in the No. 303 Polish Fighter Squadron (Polish: 303 Dywizjon Myśliwski "Warszawski im. Tadeusza Kościuszki"). He was B-group Flight Commander of the squadron. A week after his final promotion, in 1941, he was on a mission escorting bombers when his plane was shot down by a German fighter near Dunkirk over the English Channel; he was never found.

== Military career ==

Tadeusz Arentowicz was a graduate of the Polish Air Force University in Dęblin (VII Promotion). On 15 August 1933 he was promoted to the rank of second lieutenant in the Polish Air Force and was assigned to the 1st Air Regiment, stationed in Warsaw. He finished his training in Grudziądz and became an instructor at Ułęż airport near Dęblin in March 1939. See No. 315 Polish Fighter Squadron.

He participated in the September Campaign as a member of the Dęblin Group. He was evacuated to Romania from Wielick airport with other pilots. He waited to be picked up by the English at the Port of Constanța. The English transports never arrived to pick him and the others up. He managed to make his way to France and proceeded on to England.

He received his service number of P-0251 in 1941. After he was trained to use British equipment, he was assigned to the 303rd Polish Fighter Squadron. He fulfilled the duties of squadron leader after the death of Zdzisław Henneberg and came to be the commander of the whole squadron on 3 July 1941.

He joined 303 Squadron after the Battle of Britain. Little is known; but he was known by the nickname "Szpak" ('Starling' in English). Although he started as a flight lieutenant, death (Zdzisław Henneberg) and injury (Wacław Łapkowski) of his predecessors created a vacancy, and he was elevated to flight commander.

On 3 March 1941, after the squadron had been upgraded to Spitfire Mk IIA planes, Arentowich led the attack on the German airfield at Le Touquet and another at Waben, and strafed an army transport depot at Breck-sur-Mer.

On 16 April 1941, Arentowich had become the acting commanding officer. He presented a nomination of Waclaw Lapkowski (a second time) for the Cross of Valor.

On 11 March 1941, ground control vectored him and two other pilots to attack an aircraft at 10,000 feet. This incident came to be called "A Little Mistake" in the squadron's log. Arentowicz was part of an attack by three Polish Spitfires on a friendly Armstrong Whitworth Whitley that was involved in paratroop training. Fortunately, and despite 100 hits, the plane survived and there were no injuries.

He was given a prominent role during at least one ceremonial occasion.

He was at the helm of Spitfire II PF 8385 IMPREGNABLE and damaged a Messerschmitt Bf 109 on 25 June 1941.

=== Death ===
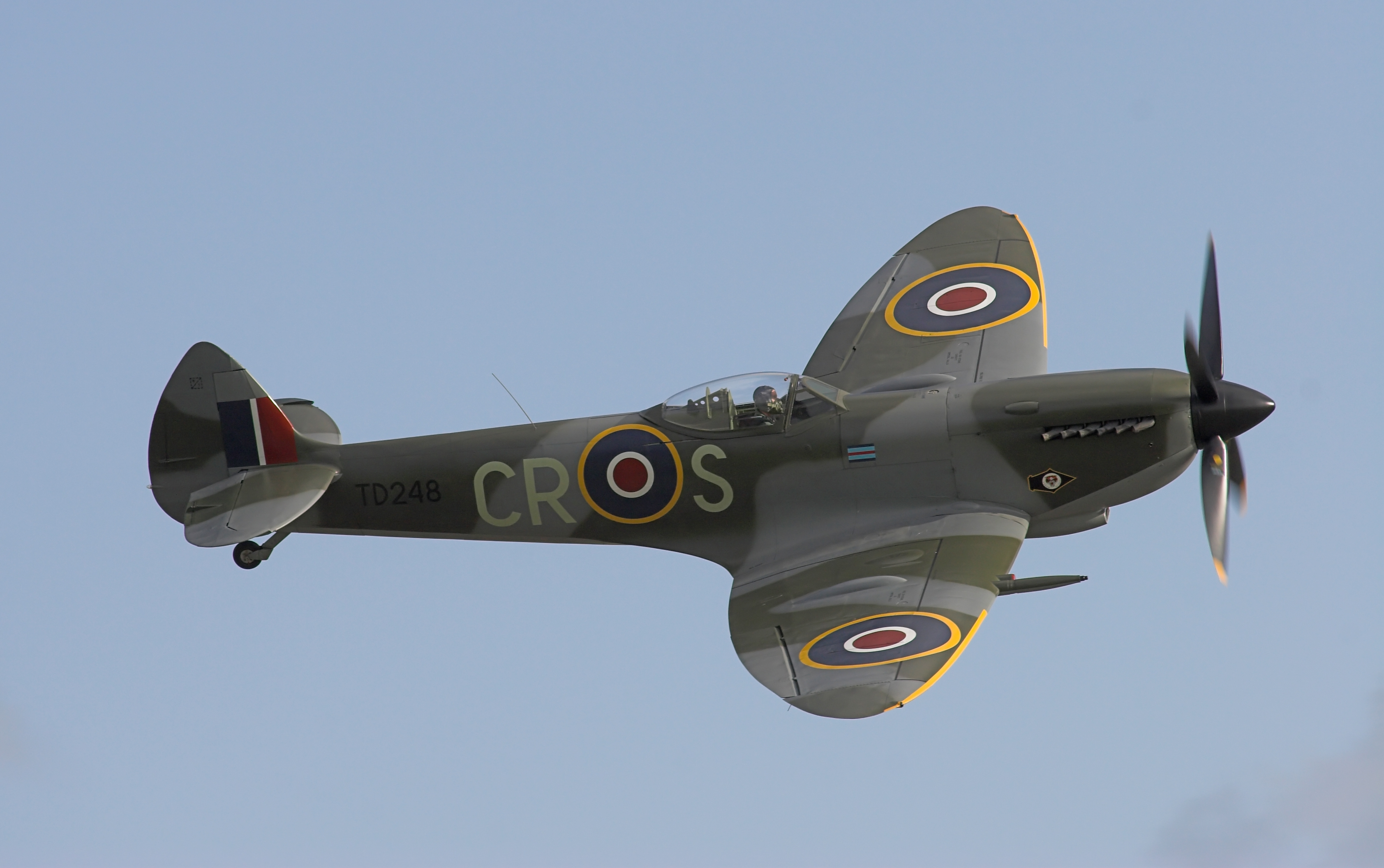
Supermarine Spitfire (Note: Supermarine Spitfire similar to the plane that Arentowicz was piloting in 1941 when he was shot down over the English Channel.)

On 8 July 1941, he flew the Supermarine Spitfire (designation P 8502) on a mission to escort bombers targeting the railway line and station in Lille. He was shot down by a German fighter, and the other pilots saw him crash in the sea somewhere near Dunkirk. Polish forces searched for him but he was never found.

He is remembered on the Polish Memorial to Aircrew in Warsaw and the Polish War Memorial near RAF Northolt.

== Awards ==
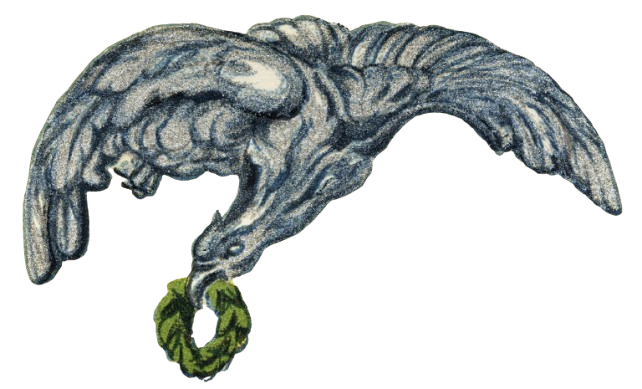
- Aviator badge
- Polish Cross of Valour
- Field Pilot's Badge

== See also ==
- 2018 film Hurricane: 303 Squadron
- Air Force of the Polish Army
- List of Royal Air Force aircraft squadrons
- Non-British personnel in the RAF during the Battle of Britain, emphasizing the experience of the transplanted pilots and the superiority of their tactics.
- Polish Air Forces
- Polish Air Forces in Great Britain,\
- Polish contribution to World War II
