= Jan Daszewski =

Polish fighter pilot

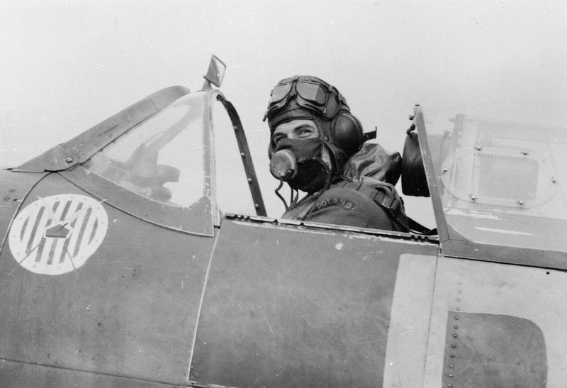
- Born: 5 April 1916; Kiev, Russian Empire
- Died: 4 April 1942 (aged 25); English Channel
- Military career
- Allegiance: Poland; France; United Kingdom
- Branch: Polish Air Force; French Air Force; Royal Air Force
- Service years: 1938-1942
- Rank: Flight commander
- Units: Polish 112th Fighter Escadrille; 303 Squadron
- Awards: Virtuti Militari; Cross of Valour

Jan Kazimierz Daszewski (5 April 1916 – 4 April 1942) was a fighter pilot in the Polish Air Force in World War II. Jan Daszewski was born on 5 April 1916 in Kiev. He trained at the "School of Eaglets" in Dęblin. In 1938 he was posted to 112 Fighter Escadrille and participated in the September 1939 campaign in Poland, claiming a Ju 87 destroyed. Via Romania he escaped to France and in May 1940 he was posted to ECD I/55 flying the Bloch MB 152, where he claimed a He 111 destroyed. On 2 August 1940 he was posted to No. 303 Squadron RAF.

His achievements are described in Arkady Fiedler's book Dywizjon 303 (Squadron 303). With Jan Zumbach, Mirosław Ferić and Witold Łokuciewski, Daszewski was one of the famous "four musketeers" of Polish pilots fighting in the Battle of Britain. On 7 September he was wounded in combat, suffering a severe thigh injury, returning to 303 Squadron on 27 December 1940.

On 22 November 1941 he became a flight commander in 303 Squadron. He was shot down and posted missing over the English Channel in April 1942. His wartime tally was 3 destroyed, 2 probables and 1 destroyed on the ground. He was awarded the Silver Cross of Virtuti Militari, Cross of Valour and three bars.
