= 111th Fighter Escadrille =

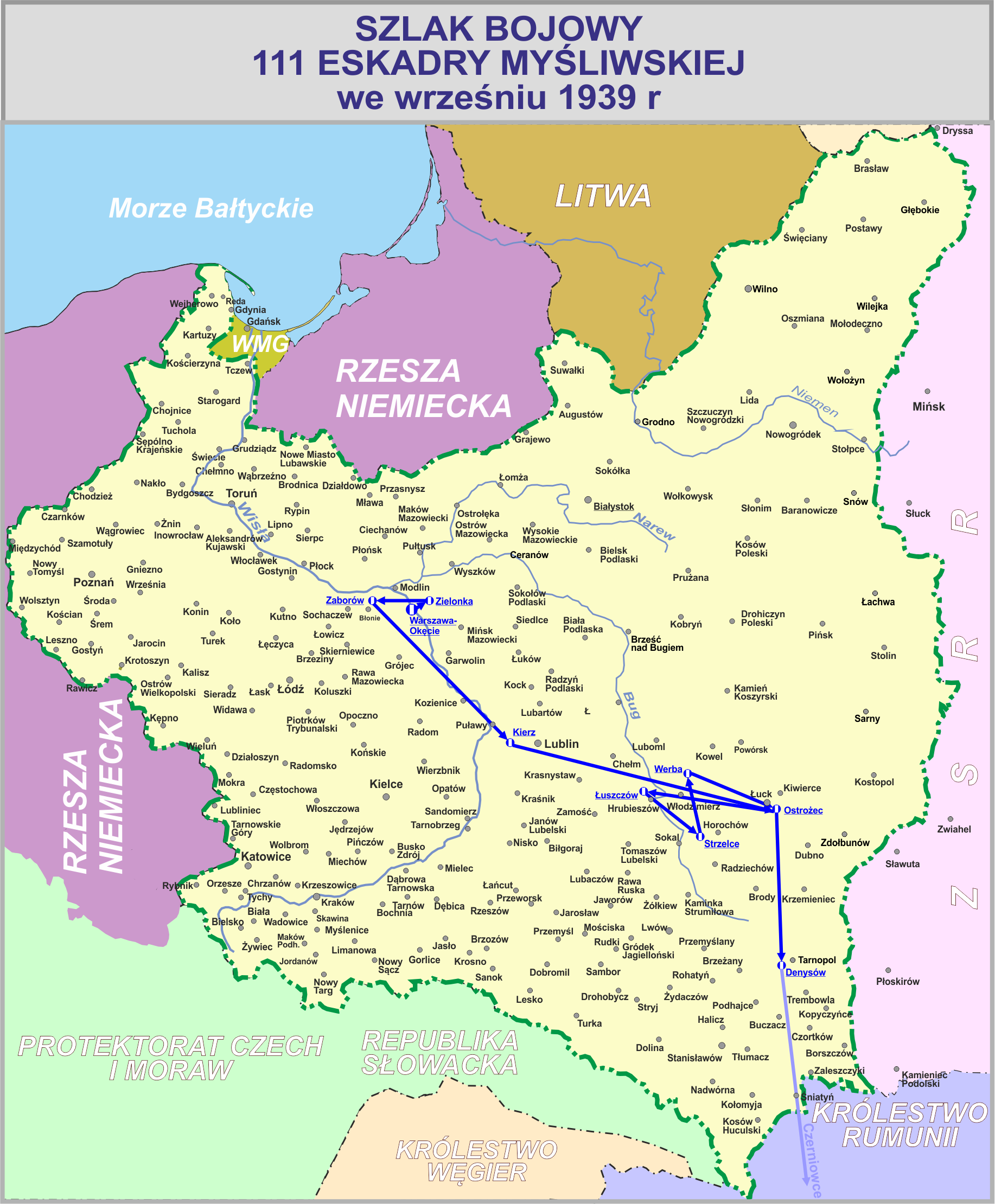

The 111th Fighter Escadrille of the Polish Air Force (Polish: 111. eskadra myśliwska) was one of the fighter units of the Polish Army. Created in 1921, immediately after the end of the Polish-Soviet War, the unit inherited the traditions of the famous war-time Polish 7th Air Escadrille (known as the Kościuszko Squadron), in which both Polish and American volunteers served.

== History ==
The unit was created on May 19, 1921 out of two previously-existing units, the Polish 7th Air Escadrille and the Polish 18th Air Escadrille of the 1st Air Regiment. Initially it was manned mostly by the American veterans of the earlier unit, including Cedric Fauntleroy. However, soon afterwards most of the American pilots returned home and the unit was manned with Polish officers. Nonetheless, it retained the roundel and the traditions of the Polish-American unit. In 1934 the unit was the first to receive the then-modern PZL P.11c fighters. In 1936 the escadrille was stationed in Sarny and was providing air cover for a construction of border fortifications at the frontier with the Soviet Union. During one of the sorties Lt. Witold Urbanowicz, later to become one of the fighter aces of World War II, downed a Soviet Polikarpov R-5 biplane reconnaissance aircraft flying a reconnaissance mission over the area.

In 1939 it was attached to the Pursuit Brigade, a large fighter unit held in reserve of the Commander in Chief. As part of the Polish 3rd Squadron of the 1st Air Regiment (Polish: III/1 dywizjon myśliwski) under Zdzisław Krasnodębski, the unit was stationed at the airfield at Zielonka and provided air cover for the nearby city of Warsaw. During the Polish September Campaign the first sortie — and the first success of the escadrille — took place on September 1, at 4 in the morning, that is roughly an hour before the fights for Westerplatte started, an event which is usually taken as the starting point of World War II. The escadrille was scrambled to intercept a large formation of enemy bombers escorted by Messerschmitt Bf 110 heavy fighters. Over the area of Modlin the enemy formation was intercepted and forced to retreat, dropping their bombs on uninhabited areas. Lt. Palusiński downed one enemy Dornier Do 17 and probably damaged another plane of that type. Palusiński himself was wounded by enemy fire.

Later that day another bombing raid on Warsaw was intercepted, this time covered by Messerschmitt Bf 109 fighters. During the air battles over Warsaw the escadrille's commanding officer managed to down one enemy fighter, but was then shot down and wounded. The command was taken over by his deputy, Lt. Januszewicz. The following day the escadrille did not encounter any enemy formations. On September 3 a flight from the escadrille, providing air cover for Col. Stefan Pawlikowski intercepted a formation of enemy Bf 110 fighters over Wyszków. Lt. Januszewicz and Corporal Karubin downed two enemy fighters. However, at the same time another flight led by Ferić was dispersed and had to return to base. One of its pilots did not return to the escadrille until September 10.

On September 4 the escadrille was transferred to the Zaborów airfield near Leszno. Its commanding officer downed a Junkers Ju 87 (other sources mention a Dornier Do 17). The following day Strzembosz and Januszewicz scored another two victories, this time over a Bf 110 and Ju 87, respectively. On September 6 Januszewicz scored yet another Ju 87. On September 7 the escadrille was evacuated to eastern Poland and was stationed in the Kierz airfield near Lublin. It briefly operated from the airfield of Ostrożec near Łuck, but returned to Lublin area the following day (Strzelce and Werba airfields). The last confirmed victories were over a reconnaissance Henschel Hs 126 on September 9 (Ferić) and Heinkel He 111 on September 11 (Wróblewski). Altogether during the campaign the unit downed 8 enemy planes (other sources mention 7½) while losing 9 of its own PZL P.11c fighters.

After the Soviet invasion of Poland on September 17, the unit was evacuated to Romania together with its 4 remaining fighters. From there the majority of the pilots were able to get to France and the United Kingdom, where many joined the Polish Air Forces in exile. The traditions of the escadrille, as well as its predecessor, was then continued by the No. 303 Polish Fighter Squadron, one of the most successful Allied fighter units of the war.

== Crew and equipment ==
On September 1, 1939, the escadrille had 9 planes, including 7 PZL P.11c and 2 PZL P.11a. Throughout the war it received an additional PZL P.11c as reinforcement. The air crew consisted of kapitan (Captain) Gustaw Sidorowicz, his deputy porucznik (Lieutenant) Wojciech Januszewicz and 16 other pilots:

1. ppor. Mirosław Ferić
2. ppor. Janusz Łabicki
3. ppor. Jerzy Palusiński
4. pchor. Władysław Drecki
5. pchor. Zbigniew Janicki
6. pchor. Janusz Maciński
7. pchor. Mieczysław Rozwadowski
8. st. sierż Jan Kołcon (later RAF warrant officer)
9. plut. Ignacy Lendzion
10. kpr. Stanisław Karubin
11. kpr. Eugeniusz Szaposznikow
12. st. szer. Bogdan Cichocki
13. st. szer. Henryk Szope
14. st. szer. Stefan Wojtowicz
15. st. szer. Kazimierz Wünsche
16. st. szer. Kazimierz Wróblewski

== Notes and references ==
In-line:

General:

- Jerzy Pawlak (1989). Polskie eskadry w latach 1918-1939 (in Polish). Warsaw: Wydawnictwa Komunikacji i Łączności. pp. 60–69. ISBN 83-206-0760-4.
- Jerzy Pawlak (1982). Polskie eskadry w Wojnie Obronnej 1939 (in Polish). Warsaw: Wydawnictwa Komunikacji i Łączności. p. 280. ISBN 83-206-0281-5.
