= Ludwik Witold Paszkiewicz =

Polish fighter ace (1907–1940)

Ludwik Paszkiewicz DFC
- Born: 21 October 1907; Wola Gałęzowska, Russian Empire (present-day Poland)
- Died: 27 September 1940 (aged 32); Borough Green, England
- Military career
- Allegiance: Poland; France; United Kingdom
- Branch: Polish Air Force; France Armée de l'Air; Royal Air Force
- Service years: 1931–1940
- Rank: Flying officer
- Service number: P-1293
- Units: Polish 112th Fighter Escadrille; No. 303 Polish Fighter Squadron
- Commands: Polish 112th Fighter Escadrille
- Conflicts: World War II
- Awards: Virtuti Militari; Cross of Valour; Distinguished Flying Cross (United Kingdom)

Ludwik Paszkiewicz DFC (21 October 1907 – 27 September 1940) was a Polish fighter ace of the Polish Air Force in World War II with 6 confirmed kills.

== Biography ==
Ludwik Paszkiewicz was born in 1907, the son of Ludwik and Janina. He studied at the Warsaw University of Technology then at the Lviv Polytechnic. In 1931 after his graduation he began military service. After completing Cadet Reserve course in Mołodeczno, Paszkiewicz entered the Polish Air Force Academy. On 4 August 1934 he was promoted to second lieutenant (podporucznik). Then he was assigned to the Polish 112th Fighter Escadrille. In 1937, he was promoted to the rank of lieutenant (porucznik). The same year, he married Maria Piwnicka, and one year later their daughter was born.

In 1939, he became commander of his unit. In August, he went to France with a military mission in order to buy aircraft, where the outbreak of the World War II found him. On 18 May 1940, Paszkiewicz became commander of the new formed section of the Groupe de Chasse II/8. In the Battle of Britain, the section made 33 flights, but never met the enemy.

On 21 June 1940, Paskiewicz arrived in the UK. On 2 August, he was posted to No. 303 Polish Fighter Squadron. On 30 August, during a training flight, he disobeyed orders and shot down a Messerschmitt Bf 110 fighter. He was officially reprimanded and unofficially congratulated by his superior officer. After S/L Kellet's personal recommendation, the squadron was declared operational next day by No. 11 Group RAF. His victory was portrayed in the movie Battle of Britain.

On 6 September, he became the commander of Flight B, when Wacław Łapkowski, the previous commander was wounded. The next day, Paszkiewicz downed two Dornier Do 17 light bombers. On 11 September, he shot down another Bf 110 and on 15 September he became an ace shooting down a Bf 109 fighter.

On 26 September, during the visit of King George VI, No. 303 Squadron was scrambled towards a large enemy raid over Hampshire, Paszkiewicz claimed a Heinkel He 111 bomber.

On 27 September, Paszkiewicz was hit by a Bf 109 and died in a crash-landing in Borough Green, Kent. He was buried at Northwood Cemetery, Middlesex.

His only daughter died of diphtheria in 1941. His widow took part in the Warsaw Uprising. In 1960, she entered the convent of the Immaculate Conception in Szymanów, where she was named Augustyna. She died in 1995.

== Memorials ==
A memorial stone dedicated to Paszkiewicz was unveiled in 2018, at Crowhurst Farm in Borough Green, by Shoreham Aircraft Museum, close to where he was shot down.

== Aerial victory credits ==
- Bf 110 – 30 August 1940 (during a training flight; Bf 110 flown by Oberfw. Georg Anthony, gunner Uffz. Heinrich Nordmeyer jumped with a parachute)
- 2 Do 17 – 7 September 1940
- Bf 110 - 11 September 1940
- Bf 109 - 15 September 1940
- He 111 – 26 September 1940

== Awards ==
Virtuti Militari, Silver Cross
Cross of Valour (Poland), two times
Distinguished Flying Cross (United Kingdom)
