= Eugeniusz Szaposznikow =

Polish fighter ace

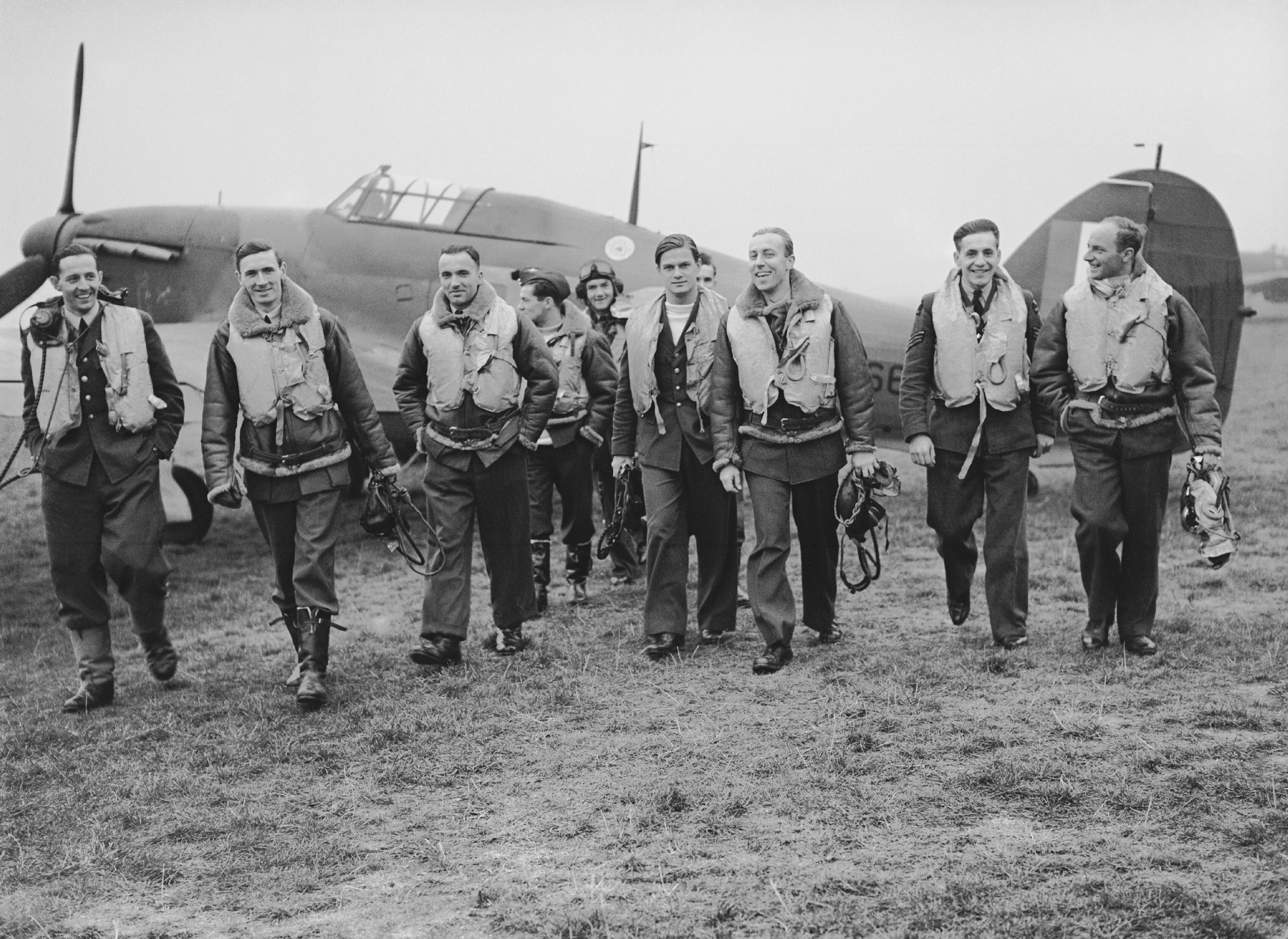
- Szaposznikow, far left
- Born: 17 July 1917
- Died: 8 July 1991 (aged 73); Nottingham
- Military career
- Allegiance: Poland; France; United Kingdom
- Branch: Polish Air Force (France) Armée de l'Air; Royal Air Force
- Rank: Kapitan
- Service number: P-1653
- Units: 111th Fighter Escadrille (Poland); No. 303 Polish Fighter Squadron; No. 316 Polish Fighter Squadron
- Conflicts: Polish Defensive War, World War II
- Awards: Virtuti Militari; Cross of Valour; Cross of Merit (Poland); Distinguished Flying Medal

Eugeniusz Szaposznikow (17 July 1917 – 8 July 1991) was a Polish fighter ace of the Polish Air Force in World War II.

== Biography ==
Szaposznikow took part in the September campaign in the 111th Fighter Escadrille. On 1 September he damaged a He 111. After the campaign he crossed the border with Romania, then he came to France where he was posted to the Cebrzyński section of the Groupe de Chasse II/5. After the French capitulation he arrived in the United Kingdom. From 2 August 1940 he was assigned to No. 303 Polish Fighter Squadron.

He took part in the Battle of Britain. From 31 August to 7 October he shot down eight German aircraft. In May 1941 he became instructor in 8 OTU. On 14 December 1943 he was sent to No. 316 Polish Fighter Squadron, on 21 December 1943 he returned to No. 303 squadron.

After the war ended he stayed in the UK and changed his name to Sharman.

Eugeniusz Szaposznikow died on 8 July 1991 in Nottingham.

== Aerial victory credits ==
- He 111–1 September 1939 (damaged)
- 1/3 Hs 126 - Battle of France
- Bf 109–31 August 1940
- Do 215–7 September 1940
- Bf 109–7 September 1940
- 2 x Bf 110–11 September 1940
- Bf 109–23 September 1940
- Bf 109–27 September 1940
- Bf 109–7 October 1940 and one damaged

== Awards ==
Virtuti Militari, Silver Cross
Cross of Valour (Poland), four times
Cross of Merit (Poland)
Distinguished Flying Medal

== Military promotions ==
- podporucznik - November 1941
- porucznik - 1 November 1942
- kapitan - 1 November 1944
