= Marian Pisarek =

Polish fighter pilot (1912–1942)

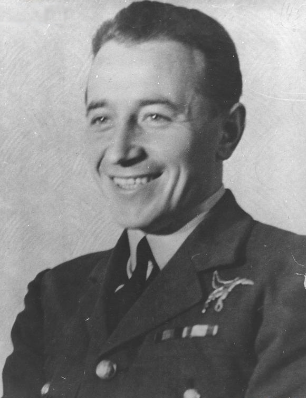
- Born: 3 January 1912
- Died: 29 April 1942 (aged 30)
- Military career
- Allegiance: Poland; France; United Kingdom
- Branch: Polish Air Force; France Armée de l'Air; Royal Air Force
- Service number: P1915
- Units: No. 303 Polish Fighter Squadron; No. 308 Polish Fighter Squadron; No. 131 Wing RAF
- Conflicts: Polish Defensive War, World War II
- Awards: Virtuti Militari; Cross of Valour; Distinguished Flying Cross (UK)

Marian Pisarek (3 January 1912 – 29 April 1942), was a Polish fighter pilot, a flying ace of World War II, with 11 planes confirmed shot down and an additional three probable.

== Biography ==
In 1939, he was a member of the Polish 141st Fighter Squadron, flying P-11C's. On the first day of the war, 1 September 1939, he shot down a German Henschel Hs 126. Next day, Pisarek downed - in error- a Polish P-23 "Karas" bomber. On 4 September, he shot down a Ju 87 "Stuka".

After evacuation through Romania, Pisarek arrived in France. After the French surrender, the Polish aviators flew to Oran, in French North Africa. Eventually, via Casablanca and Gibraltar, several Polish pilots arrived in Great Britain to join the Royal Air Force.

In early August 1940, Lt. Marian Pisarek joined 303 "Kosciuszko" Squadron, and took part in the Battle of Britain. On 7 September 1940, after shooting down one Messerschmitt Bf 109, he was shot down and had to bail out.

In June 1941, Pisarek was posted to command number 308 "City of Krakow" Squadron. On 14 August 1941, Pisarek claimed a Bf 109F destroyed.

In April 1942, Pisarek was made Wing Commander of the 1st Polish Fighter Wing (consisting of No. 303, 316, and 317 Squadrons). A few days later the wing was attacked over Le Touquet/Boulogne by a formation of JG 26 Fw 190's. Squadron Leader Piotr Ozyra (of 317 Sqn) and Wing Commander Pisarek were shot down and killed. Pisarek was probably shot down by the Commander of II/JG 26, Htpm. Joachim Müncheberg.

== Awards ==
Gold Cross of the Virtuti Militari - posthumously 11 June 1945, Cross No. 00143 (previously awarded the Silver Cross - 17 Sep 1940, Cross No. 08830)
Cross of Valour - four times
Air Force Medal 1939-45 (Medal Lotniczy)
Field Pilot Badge
Distinguished Flying Cross (United Kingdom)
