= Zygmunt Witymir Bieńkowski =

Polish poet and writer

Zygmunt Bieńkowski
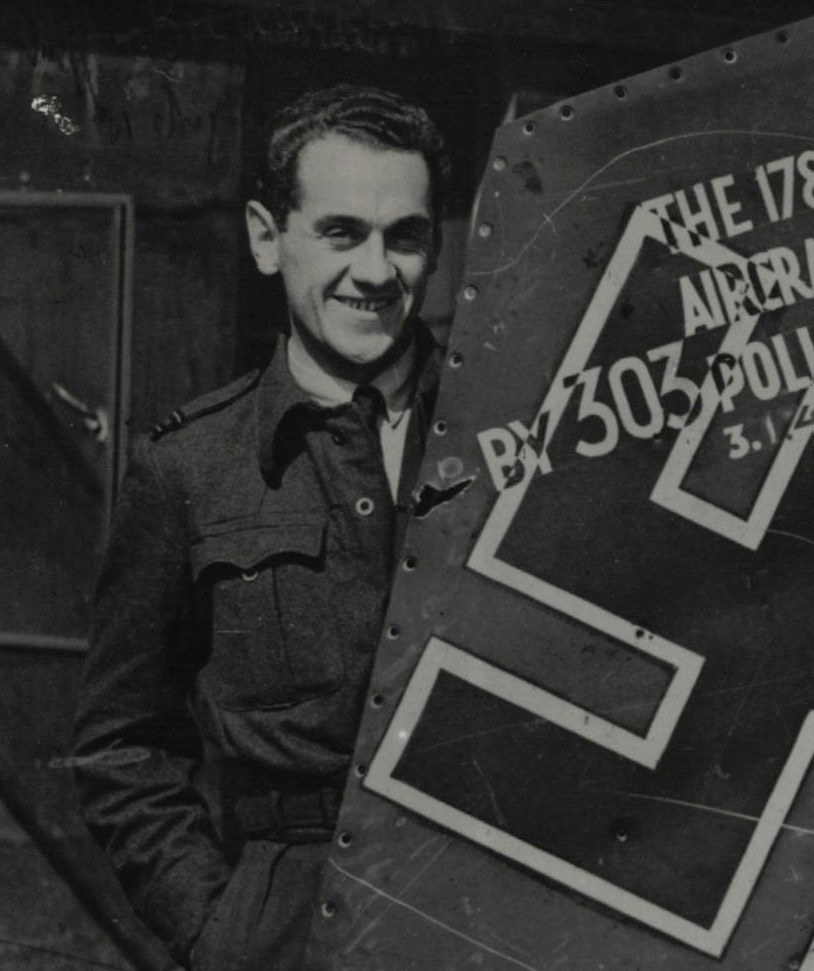
- Bieńkowski in 1943
- Born: 2 May 1913; Warsaw, Russian Empire
- Died: August 15, 1979 (aged 66); London, England
- Burial place: Polish Veteran Graves Gunnersbury Cemetery
- Military career
- Allegiance: Poland; United Kingdom
- Branch: Polish Air Force; Royal Air Force
- Rank: Squadron Leader
- Units: No. 302 Polish Fighter Squadron; No. 303 Squadron RAF
- Commands: No. 302 Squadron RAF
- Conflicts: World War II
- Awards: Krzyż Walecznych; Virtuti Militari

Zygmunt Witymir Bieńkowski (2 May 1913 Warsaw – 15 August 1979) was a Polish pilot and a writer of many articles and poems. His No. 303 Squadron RAF diary is held in the Polish Museum and Sikorski Institute in London.

Zygmunt Witymir Bieńkowski was the son of Leopold Bieńkowski (1883–1942) and Zofia Braun (1891–1943). His father was a Polish Member of Parliament from 1922 to 1928. Both his parents died in Soviet Gulag camps.

Trained as a pilot at Polish Air Force Academy in Dęblin, he did not fight in Poland in 1939, but was evacuated westwards, escaped to Romania, then to France and on 27 June 1940 arrived in England. During the Battle of Britain, he served with 55 OTU in Aston Down. In May 1941, he joined No. 245 Squadron. In July 1941, he was transferred to No. 303 Squadron, based at Northolt. On 6 November 1941, Bieńkowski claimed a Messerschmitt Bf 109 fighter shot down. On 12 April 1942, his aircraft was shot up by a Focke-Wulf Fw 190, and he had to force land with collapsed landing gear near the English coast.

He served from 1 December 1942 until 4 July 1943 as Squadron Leader of No. 303 Squadron. At that time he was also flying with 315 (Polish) Squadron and on 13 May 1943 was involved in combat with enemy fighters between 11.30 and 13.05. After that, his Spitfire Mk.IX BS242 disappeared from the list and on 6 June 1943, after repairs, was delivered to 303 Squadron.

During July 1943, No. 303 Squadron were stationed at RAF Kirton-in-Lindsey, where the newly arrived US Army Air Corps 94th Fighter Squadron had just been assigned. He befriended some of the American pilots, who gave him the affectionate nickname "Bing Crosby", a play on his family name.

From January 1945 to 24 February 1945, he commanded 302. On 24 February, his Spitfire Mk. XVI (TB341, "WX-B") was shot down by flak over Germany near Wesel and he was taken prisoner. Released by American forces, by the end of the war he was a wing commander. During the war, he flew 74 sorties, claiming one Bf 109 destroyed and a Fw 190 damaged.

== Death ==
He died on 15 August 1979 in London aged 66. He was buried in Gunnersbury Cemetery in West London. His brother Jan Bieńkowski, also a pilot; was shot down over Cherbourg in 1944.

== Military awards ==
Virtuti Militari, Silver Cross
Krzyż Walecznych (Cross of Valour), 3 times
Vliegerkruis (Airman's Cross) (Netherlands)
