= Robinson Crusoe Island (novel) =

1955 edition (publ. Iskry) Cover art by Zbigniew Rychlicki

Robinson Crusoe Island (Polish: Wyspa Robinsona) is a historical adventure novel for young people by Polish author Arkady Fiedler. It was first published in 1954.

== Plot summary ==
The story takes place on Coche Island, 1725-1726. The protagonist Jan (John) Bober, a half-Polish half-English Virginia pioneer, flees from government pursuit in a pirate ship. However, it runs into heavy water and wrecks near the island. Jan and his two Arawak companions Arnak and Wagura (former slaves from the ship), the only survivors of the shipwreck, live on the island for over a year. Later they accept onto the island a group of escaped slaves from Margarita Island and, combining forces, defeat Spanish slaver pursuers and seize their ship. Fearing Spanish revenge, Jan and his followers leave the island on the captured ship. Their adventures continue in the two next Arkady Fiedler's novels Orinoco (Orinoko, 1957) and The White Jaguar (Biały Jaguar, 1980).
