= No. 303 Squadron RAF =

No. 303 (Kosciusko) Squadron RAF
- 303 Squadron Honour Badge design
- Active: 2 August 1940 – 11 December 1946
- Country: United Kingdom
- Allegiance: Polish government-in-exile
- Branch: Royal Air Force
- Role: Fighter Squadron
- Part of: RAF Fighter Command
- Nickname: Kosciusko; Rafałki
- Scarf colour: Scarlet
- Anniversaries: 1 September Squadron holiday
- Battle honours: Battle of Britain 1940, Fortress Europe 1941-1944, France and Germany 1944-1945

Commanders
- Notable commanders: R. G. Kellett; John A. Kent; Zdzisław Krasnodębski; Witold Urbanowicz; Jan Zumbach; Witold Łokuciewski

Insignia
- Squadron Codes: RF (Aug 1940 – Apr 1945); PD (Apr 1945 – Dec 1946)

Aircraft flown
- Fighter: Hawker Hurricane; Supermarine Spitfire; Mustang IV

No. 303 Squadron RAF, also known as the 303rd "Tadeusz Kościuszko Warsaw" Fighter Squadron, (Note: Polish: 303 Dywizjon Myśliwski „Warszawski im. Tadeusza Kościuszki", often shortened to Dywizjon 303) was one of two Polish squadrons that fought during the Battle of Britain along with No. 302 Squadron, of 16 total Polish squadrons during the Second World War. Flying Hawker Hurricanes, the squadron was ranked 1st with 75 verified victories ahead of 603, 609 and 41 squadrons of the 66 Allied fighter squadrons engaged in the Battle of Britain, even though it joined the fray two months after the battle had begun.

No. 303 Squadron RAF was formed in July 1940 in Blackpool, England before deployment to RAF Northolt on 2 August as part of an agreement between the Polish Government in Exile and the United Kingdom. It was disbanded in December 1946.

"Had it not been for the magnificent material contributed by the Polish squadrons and their unsurpassed gallantry," wrote Air Chief Marshal Sir Hugh Dowding, head of RAF Fighter Command, "I hesitate to say that the outcome of the Battle (of Britain) would have been the same."

== History ==
No. 303 Squadron was based at RAF Northolt from 2 August 1940, and became operational on 31 August. Its initial cadre was 13 Officer and 8 NCO pilots and 135 Polish ground staff. At the outset, serving RAF officers were appointed to serve as CO (S/Ldr RG Kellett) and Flight Commanders (F/Lt JA Kent and F/Lt AS Forbes) alongside the Poles, as the Polish pilots were unfamiliar with RAF Fighter Command language, procedures and training.

The nickname chosen by the squadron was in honour of the famous 18th century Polish general Tadeusz Kościuszko. No. 303 Squadron was also linked to the original 1919 Kościuszko Escadrille through personnel that had served in that squadron. Later, further air force units from this unit were renamed the 7th, 121st and 111th Escadrilles of the Polish Air Force.

=== Battle of Britain August–October 1940 ===
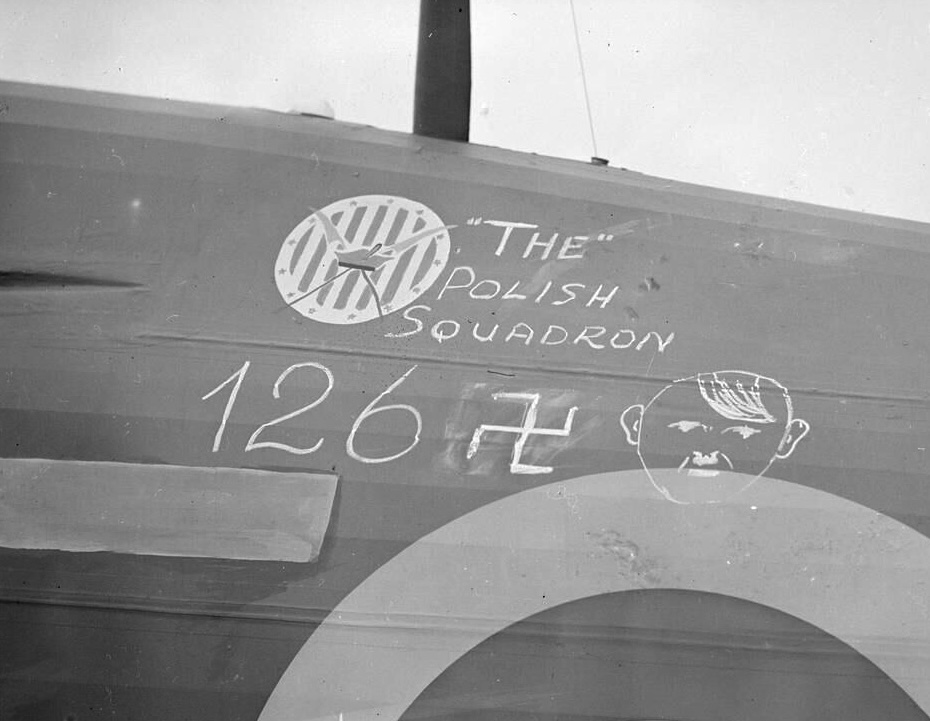
126 German aircraft or "Adolfs" were claimed by No. 303 Squadron pilots during the Battle of Britain. Later verified as 75 actual kills

During the Battle of Britain, No. 303 Squadron was equipped with Hawker Hurricane fighter aircraft. Manned by experienced veterans, equipped with a fighter plane on a technical par with most of its opponents, and expertly backed by the well-established RAF command, communication, and logistics infrastructure, the squadron was able to become an effective fighting force during the Battle. After a period of training, the squadron was scrambled for the first time on 24 August 1940, although it did not come into contact with any enemy aircraft on this occasion. On 30 August 1940, the squadron scored its first victory while still officially non-operational, when a German Messerschmitt Bf 110 of 4./ZG 76 (initially incorrectly recorded as a Dornier Do 17) was shot down by F/O Ludwik Paszkiewicz during a training flight. This kill was in fact a shared kill with Pilot Officer B.J. Wicks of 56 squadron. The wreck was excavated in 1982. After S/L Kellett's personal recommendation, the squadron was declared operational next day by No. 11 Group RAF.

On 31 August 1940, the squadron was scrambled in the late afternoon on its first operational sortie. In a dogfight over Kent, "A" Flight claimed four confirmed and two probable victories over Messerschmitt Bf 109s, possibly of LG 2. Claimants were S/Ldr Kellet, F/O Henneberg, P/O Ferić and Sgt. Karubin.

During 2 September 1940, the squadron was scrambled three times. On the last scramble, P/O Ferić shot down a Bf 109 and then made a forced landing near Dover while former Czechoslovak Air Force pilot Sgt. Josef František claimed a Bf 110. The following day over Dover, František claimed his second victory; with a total of 17 victories, he became one of the top-scoring Allied fighter pilots during the Battle of Britain. On 5 September, nine No. 303 Hurricanes intercepted a German bombing formation escorted by Bf 109s, with the Poles claiming five Bf 109s and three Junkers Ju 88s for one loss: P/O Łapkowski, who bailed out wounded.

On 6 September 1940, nine Hurricanes were scrambled towards incoming bomber formations. However, during the climb, they were bounced by Bf 109s of III./JG 27. S/Ldr Kellet and F/Lt Forbes both force-landed and were wounded slightly, while Sgt Karubin bailed out wounded, S/Ldr Krasnodębski was severely burned, and three other Hurricanes were damaged. The squadron claimed five Bf 109s (of JG 27 and JG 52), a Do 17 and a Heinkel He 111. F/O Witold Urbanowicz was appointed as acting Squadron Leader.

On 7 September 1940, the German air offensive switched to the London docks. No. 303 Squadron was successfully vectored towards the incoming bomber streams and claimed 12 Do 17s and two Bf 109s, with P/O Zumbach, P/O Ferić, Sgt. Szaposznikow and Sgt. Wójtowicz all scoring double victories. P/O Daszewski was shot down and seriously wounded, while F/O Pisarek bailed out. His Hurricane crashed in a back garden of a house in Loughton, killing a family of three in their shelter. Two other aircraft were damaged. On 9 September 1940, 12 Hurricanes were scrambled and two claims made over Bf 109s by Zumbach (both of JG 53) and one by František – a Bf 109 of 7./JG 27 – who also claimed a He 111 of KG 53 as a "probable", while a Bf 110 was shot down by F/L Kent. Sgt. Kazimierz Wünsche had to bail out with burns over Beachy Head, and Sgt. František crash-landed.

At 16:00 hours on 11 September 1940, the squadron attacked a bomber formation south of London. F/O Cebrzyński was fatally wounded by return fire, and Sgt. Wójtowicz shot down two Messerschmitt Bf 110s before being shot down and killed. The pilots claimed two Bf 110s, one Bf 109, three Do 17s, and four He 111s.

In the massed dogfights over London on 15 September 1940, the squadron was heavily involved, with nine Hurricanes led by F/Lt Kent intercepting a German raid in mid-morning. Nine kills were claimed: six Bf 109s, one Bf 110 and two Do 17s. In the afternoon, a flight formation led by S/Ldr Kellet claimed four victories, while the five-strong "B" Flight led by F/O Urbanowicz, claimed two Do 17s, for two Polish pilots shot down (Sgt. Brzezowski killed, Sgt Andruszków bailed out while P/O Łokuciewski was wounded in the leg, returning to base safely). During the day, No. 303 Squadron claimed 15 victories.

On the afternoon of 26 September 1940, No. 303 Squadron was scrambled towards a large enemy raid over Hampshire, with the Poles claiming 13 victories for three Hurricanes damaged (actual Luftwaffe losses were nine in total). There was further intense fighting on 27 September 1940, with 11 Hurricanes engaged by massed escorts to a KG 77 30-bomber formation. The squadron claimed 15 victories: six Bf 109s, two Bf 110s of LG 1, four "He 111s" (probably Ju 88s) and three Ju 88s. F/O Paszkiewicz and Sgt Andruszków were killed. F/O Żak was wounded and bailed out over Horsham; four Hurricanes were lost in total. Just six aircraft were serviceable during the afternoon, engaging a raid of 15 Ju 88s. Two bombers were brought down before the escort intervened, and a Bf 109 was also claimed. F/O Urbanowicz claimed four German aircraft during the day. On 30 September 1940, F/O Urbanowicz once again claimed four victories, while a Do 17 was brought down by P/O. Radomski, who bailed out, as did Sgt. Bełc, while Sgt. Karubin claimed a Bf 109.

On 5 October 1940, Polish pilots claimed five Bf 110s and four Bf 109s, though P/O Wojciech Januszewicz was killed. (Erprobungsgruppe 210 lost two Bf 110s Jabos and JG 3 and JG 53, a Bf 109 each). A fight over the Thames Estuary on 7 October saw claims for three Bf 109s of LG 2. On 8 October, Czech ace Josef František died in an air crash. He was the highest-scoring pilot of 303 Squadron and the fourth-highest scoring ace in the Battle of Britain, with 17 claims. On 11 October 1940, the squadron was transferred for a rest to Leconfield in No. 12 Group, ending its participation in the Battle of Britain.

No. 303 Squadron was ranked 4th behind 603, 609 and 41 squadrons with 44 verified claims of the 66 Allied fighter squadrons engaged in the Battle of Britain, even though it joined the fray two months after the battle had begun.

Its success in combat can be mainly attributed to the years of extensive and rigorous pre-war training many of the long-serving Polish veterans had received in their homeland, far more than many of their younger and inexperienced RAF comrades then being thrown into the fray, as well as the many kills credited to the non-Polish pilots in the squadron. Tactics and skill also played a role; on one occasion, No. 303's Sgt Stanislaw Karubin resorted to extreme tactics to bring down a German fighter: following a prolonged air battle, Karubin was chasing a German fighter at treetop level. As he closed in on the tail of the German fighter, Karubin realised that his Hurricane had run out of ammunition. Rather than turning back to base, he closed the distance and climbed right above the German fighter. The German pilot was so shocked to see the underside of the Hurricane within arm's reach of his cockpit that he instinctively reduced his altitude to avoid a collision and crashed into the ground. At the time it was withdrawn from battle for a rest on 11 October 1940, the squadron had claimed 126 kills in six weeks. Relative to enemy aircraft downed, Polish losses were small with 18 Hurricanes lost, seven pilots killed and five badly wounded. 303 Squadron was one of the top fighter units in the battle and the best Hurricane-equipped one. It also had the highest kill-to-loss ratio, 2.8:1. However, J. Alcorn was not able to attribute 30 aircraft shot down to any particular unit, and according to Jerzy Cynk and other Polish historians, the actual number of victories for No. 303 Squadron was about 55–60. According to Polish historian Jacek Kutzner, the verified number of kills of 303 Squadron is around 58.8, which would still place it above all other squadrons for verified kills. This is presented by Kutzner's chart, which shows Polish confirmed kills (left column), confirmed kills of all Allied squadrons, including Polish (central column) and real German losses on each day when No. 303 Squadron was involved in air combat (right column). In its first seven days of combat, the squadron claimed nearly 40 enemy aircraft.

=== War over Europe 1941 ===
By 1941, the immediate threat to the UK was over and RAF Fighter Command formulated more offensive fighter operations over occupied Europe. One of these was codenamed "Rhubarb", improvised low-level strafing attacks against opportunist targets on the ground. No. 303 flew its first "Rhubarb"' sorties on 22 January 1941. Six Hurricanes led by F/L Henneberg attacked 1./JG 26's airfield at Crecy, killing one ground crewman and destroying two Bf 109s, also wounding a pilot.

In late January 1941, the squadron converted to the Supermarine Spitfire Mk I. In February, the unit participated in the first fighter offensive sweeps, usually escorting a small number of light bombers.

In early April 1941, No. 306 (Polish) Squadron arrived at Northolt, and with No. 303 formed No. 1 Polish Fighter Wing. No. 601 Squadron RAF, also stationed at Northolt, complemented the two Polish units. The Wing was commanded by W/C Johnny Kent with W/C Urbanowicz. On 12 April 1941, six No. 303 Spitfires led by S/L Henneberg carried out a series of strafing attacks on German airfields. S/L Henneberg's Spitfire IIa (P8029) was hit by flak and the pilot had to ditch in the channel; despite an intensive search and rescue operation, he was never found. On 11 April 1941, F/L Kustrzyński shot down a Bf 109 during a rhubarb over France.

On 16 April 1941, the Polish Wing flew its first "Circus" escort operation. Engaged by Bf 109s, two Poles were lost: P/O Waszkiewicz and P/O Mierzwa. On 18 June 1941, No. 303 pilots claimed four Bf 109s without loss; two to P/O Drobiński, as RAF Fighter Command claimed 10 destroyed (The Jagdwaffe suffered no losses). On 21 June, Drobiński badly damaged the Bf 109F-2 of Oberst Adolf Galland, CO of JG 26, who made a forced landing at Calais, while W/C Kent downed Fw. Hegenauer (Galland's wingman).

On 22 June 1941, Fighter Command optimistically claimed 29 fighters shot down, No. 303 claiming six of these, two to S/L Lapkowski (JG 2 and JG 26 actually lost three aircraft). On 23 June 1941, No. 303 flew two full strength escort missions over France, and against 9./ JG 2 claimed five fighters destroyed. P/O 'Mike' Bolesław Gładych claimed three confirmed but was wounded and managed to crash land in the UK. JG 2 lost six Bf 109s and four pilots. On 28 June, No. 303 claimed another four Bf 109s, although P/O J. Bondar was shot down and killed by Uzz. Babenz, 3./JG 26. Fighter Command claimed six kills (JG 26 lost two, with three more badly damaged).

On 2 July 1941, No. 1 Polish Wing, with No. 303, engaged some 60 Bf 109s over Lille. No. 303 claimed four kills, (JG 2 lost three Bf 109s), but the squadron lost S/L Łapkowski killed, while Sgt Górecki had to bail out and was rescued from the channel. Command passed to S/L Arentowicz, who himself was shot down and killed just six days later. He was replaced by F/L Jankiewicz. After five months of operations, No. 303 was rested on 13 July, moving to Speke near Liverpool, in 9 Group, Fighter Command.

On 7 October 1941, the squadron returned to Northolt and re-equipped with the Spitfire Mk Vb. Its opponents now included the formidable Focke-Wulf Fw 190, and on 13 October camera gun film from a No. 303 pilot gave the RAF the first photographic evidence of the new fighter. As winter approached, poor weather reduced operations significantly. However, on 24 October, No. 303 claimed four fighters shot down over Gravelines.

During combat operations throughout 1941, No. 303 Squadron claimed some 46 enemy aircraft destroyed, seven probably destroyed and four damaged, for a loss of nine pilots (including three Commanding Officers). Some 20 Spitfires were written off or lost in action.

=== 1942 ===
After a quiet start to the year, on 12 February 1942, No. 303 Squadron participated in the RAF's offensive response to the 'Channel Dash' of the German battleships Scharnhorst and Gneisenau. Led by W/C Rolski, the Polish Wing flew several sorties in bad weather.

On 13 March 1942, the Squadron lost F/Lt W Łokuciewski, shot down by JG 26 and taken prisoner, and on 4 April F/L Daszewski (killed) and F/L Kustrzyński (POW) were lost over Saint-Omer having shot down two Fw 190 fighters. F/L Kustrzyński was taken prisoner while still sitting in the cockpit of his crash-landed Spitfire because his back was badly injured and he could not move. He was later transferred to Colditz Castle POW camp and ultimately to Stalag Luft III Sagan for continually trying to escape. He finally made a successful escape with RAF fighter ace, W/C Robert Stanford Tuck, and they were repatriated back to Britain by Russian military authorities who found them after they had walked across Poland following their escape.

During the spring of 1942, the frequency of offensive sorties increased and by May, No. 303 flew over the Channel daily, in numerous "Circus" escort missions and fighter sweeps. It engaged German fighters on numerous occasions, although JG 2 and JG 26, the main fighter units against Fighter Command, took an increasing toll utilising the superior Fw 190A. In early June, the unit flew sixteen squadron-strength sorties, in addition to numerous air-sea rescue, interception and convoy escort missions. On 5 June 1942, the squadron engaged Fw 190 fighters and claimed three for no loss. The squadron was rested on 15 June, relocating to Kirton in Lindsey in Lincolnshire.

On 15 August 1942, the squadron temporarily moved to Redhill near London in preparation of the Allied raid on Dieppe (Operation Jubilee). No. 303 was to fly with No. 317 Polish Fighter Squadron and four other squadrons. Covering the naval and ground forces, No. 303 Squadron claimed the highest number of aircraft shot down of all Allied squadrons participating. No. 303 then returned to Kirton in Lindsey, where it remained until March 1943.

No. 303 Squadron claimed 21 enemy aircraft destroyed in 1942, losing 10 pilots: four killed in action, two in accidents and four taken prisoner.

=== 1943 ===
In early June 1943, the unit returned once again to Northolt, and No. 1 Polish Wing. The squadron converted to the new Spitfire Mk IX and in June resumed operations. On 9 June 1943, F/O Śliwinski claimed the unit's 200th victory, a Fw 190. On 14 June 1943, Sgt. Pilot Józef Dąbrowski died on an interception practice when his aircraft crashed into the ground at Islington Cemetery, Finchley. On 24 June, both P/O Karcmarz and P/O Kobyliński were downed by 10./JG 26 pilots and made POWs.

In July 1943, S/L Falkowski replaced S/L Bieńkowski. On 6 July, the squadron, led by F/L Majewski and with No. 316 Squadron over Amiens, fought a prolonged dogfight with Fw 190s with No. 303 claiming three German fighters from JG 2 and JG 27 without loss. By this time, much of No. 303's work was escort missions for the increasing numbers of United States Army Air Forces Boeing B-17 Flying Fortress and Consolidated B-24 Liberator heavy bomber missions over Europe. During escort cover for the ill-fated Schweinfurt mission on 17 August 1943, No. 303 claimed a further three fighters downed. On a 6 September "Ramrod" mission, the squadron claimed another six fighters destroyed.

On 12 November 1943, the unit was posted to RAF Ballyhalbert in Northern Ireland and soon after S/L Koc assumed command. The squadron flew convoy patrols and carried out operational training. By the end of 1943, No. 303 Squadron had claimed 203 enemy aircraft destroyed, 40 probables, and 25 damaged.

=== 1944 ===
In April 1944, the squadron moved to the advanced landing ground at Horne, 30 miles south of London and joined No 142 Fighter Wing. The unit began flying escort sorties for bombing missions against V-1 flying bomb facilities. On 21 May the squadron strafed targets near Lille losing two pilots: F/O Brzeski and Sgt Kempka were shot down and taken prisoner. Next day Sgt Bartkowiak was also lost though he evaded capture and returned to the unit four months later.

For Operation Overlord (the Allied invasion of Normandy in June 1944) the squadron was equipped with the Spitfire V LF operating from a temporary airfield at Horne, Surrey as part of Air Defence of Great Britain (ADGB), though under the operational control of RAF Second Tactical Air Force. On D-Day, 303 flew several times over the landing beaches. After D-Day, the squadron remained with ADGB. With the commencement of the V-1 offensive on London, on 19 June 1944, No. 303 moved to RAF Westhampnett and then to RAF Merston. In June, F/S Chudek (nine kills) was shot down and killed. On 18 July, the unit went back to Westhampnett and received new Spitfire Mk IXs. Any Luftwaffe fighter opposition now remained largely absent from the Squadron's sphere of operations, but flak defences still took a toll. On 26 September S/L Drobinski replaced S/L Koc, and No. 303 continued using its Spitfires on various ground attack missions on V-1 and V-2 launch sites located in the Netherlands.

=== 1945 ===
In 1945, 303 Squadron moved to RAF Coltishall in Norfolk, East Anglia, for operations over the Netherlands. During 1945, 303 Squadron continued to operate over the Netherlands. On 3 April, the squadron joined 133 Squadron at Andrews Field, and was re-equipped with the North American Mustang Mk. IV. On 25 April 1945, 303 Squadron made its last wartime operational sortie, escorting Avro Lancasters in a raid on Berchtesgaden.

=== Postwar ===
No. 303 Squadron was the most effective Polish RAF squadron during the Second World War. Some sources state that its pilots were invited to the London Victory Parade of 1946, The Daily Telegraph reported that it was the only representative of the Polish Armed Forces in the West. The invitation was refused because no other Polish units were invited. However, according to other sources No. 303 Squadron was not invited and so could not have refused the invitation. After the end of the war, squadron morale decreased due to the treatment of Poland by the Allies (Western betrayal of Poland), and the squadron was eventually disbanded in December 1946. After the war, they were honoured by the erection of the Polish War Memorial in west London, listing the names of all Polish pilots who served in the RAF.

In 2022, after the Russian invasion of Ukraine for a second time, the number "303" was chosen by a group of Polish internet activists to name their Squad 303 which sends anti-war messages to individual Russians.

== Squadron statistics ==
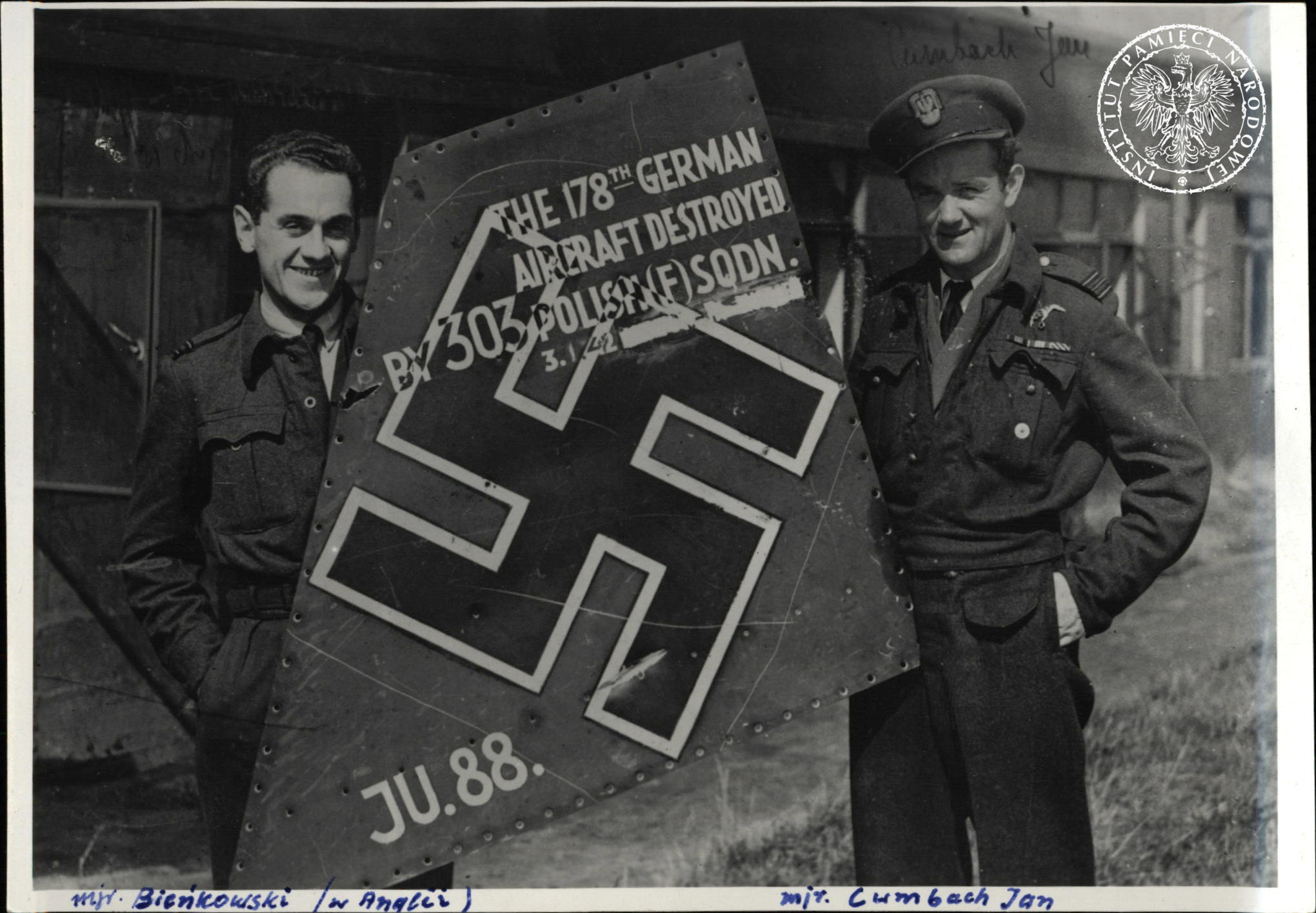
Zygmunt Bieńkowski and Jan Zumbach present the "trophy" of Squadron 303

From 19 July 1940 until 8 May 1945
	1940	1941	1942	1943	1944	1945	Total
Combat sorties	1,049	2,143	1,348	2,075	2,653	632	9,900
Hours of flight time	1,086	2,743	1,967	3,693	5,259	1,118	15,866

Enemy aircraft claimed – Battle of Britain
	Score	
destroyed	131 claimed. 75 (verified) of which 20 were shared	47 unverified / unconfirmed. 9 NO-kills
probables	13	
damaged	9	

Enemy aircraft claimed – 1 September 1940 to 8 May 1945
	Score
destroyed	164 1/6
probables	35
damaged	25

(include 303 enemy aircraft on the ground)

== Locations ==
- 2 August 1940 – RAF Northolt
- 11 October 1940 – RAF Leconfield
- 3 January 1941 – RAF Northolt
- 17 July 1941 – RAF Speke
- 7 October 1941 – RAF Northolt
- 15 June 1942 – RAF Kirton in Lindsey
- 16 August 1942 – RAF Redhill
- 20 August 1942 – RAF Kirton in Lindsey
- 1 February 1943 – RAF Northolt
- 5 February 1943 – RAF Heston
- 3 March 1943 – RAF Debden
- 12 March 1943 – RAF Heston
- 26 March 1943 – RAF Martlesham Heath
- 8 April 1943 – RAF Heston
- 1 June 1943 – RAF Northolt
- 12 November 1943 – RAF Ballyhalbert
- 30 April 1944 – RAF Horne
- 19 June 1944 – RAF Westhampnett
- 27 June 1944 – RAF Merston
- 9 August 1944 – RAF Westhampnett
- 25 August 1944 – RAF Coltishall
- 4 April 1945 – RAF Andrews Field
- 16 May 1945 – RAF Coltishall
- 9 August 1945 – RAF Andrews Field
- 28 November 1945 – RAF Turnhouse
- 4 January 1946 – RAF Wick
- 31 March 1946 – RAF Charterhall
- 23 March 1946 – RAF Hethel

== Commanding officers ==
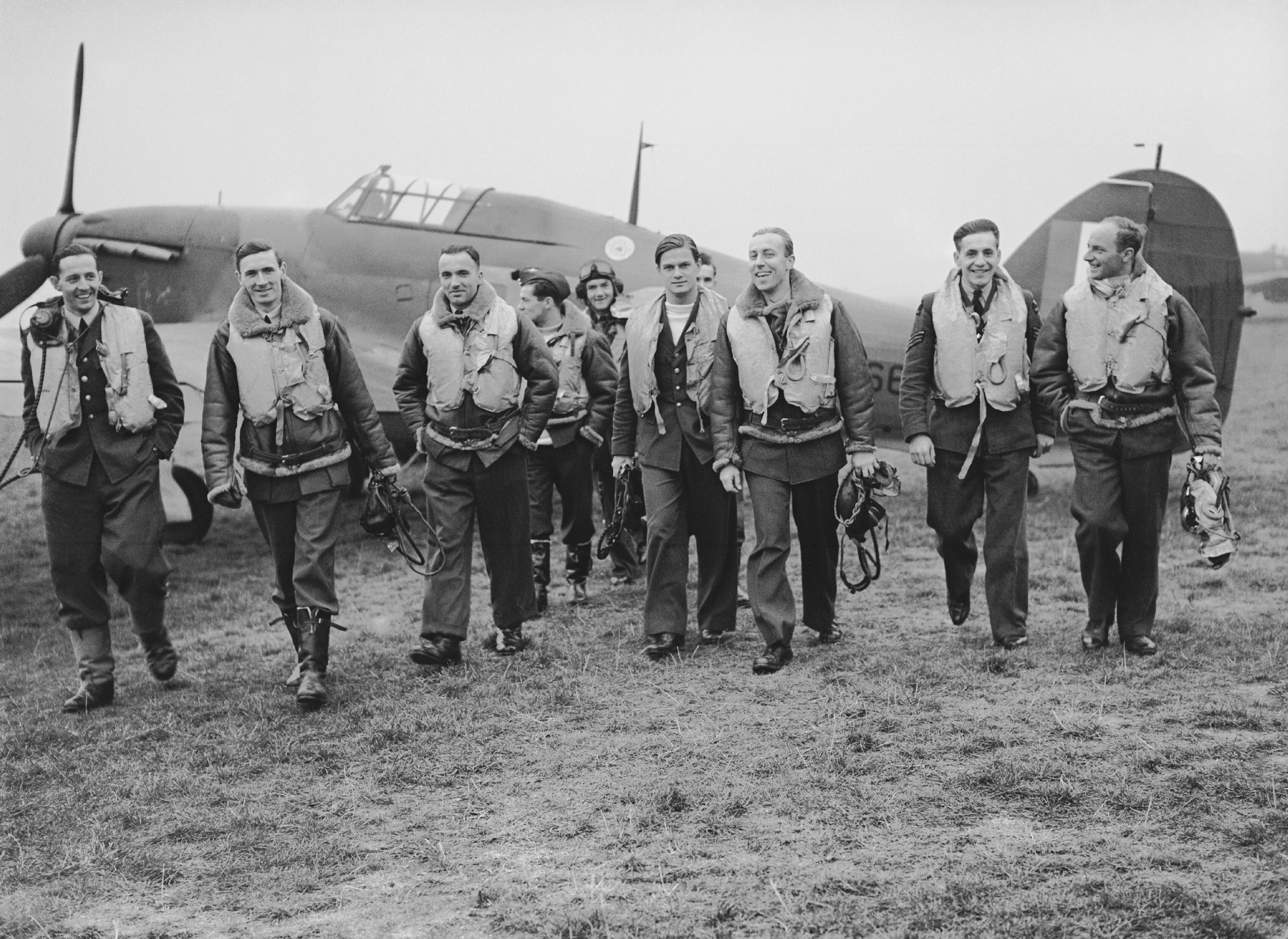
303 squadron pilots. L-R: F/O Ferić, F/Lt Lt Kent, F/O Grzeszczak, P/O Radomski, P/O Zumbach, P/O Łokuciewski, F/O Henneberg, Sgt Rogowski, Sgt Szaposznikow (in 1940).

(under British command until 1 January 1941. Abbreviations: maj: major, cpt.: captain, lt.: lieutenant)

- 19 July 1940 – Sqn Ldr Ronald Kellett
- 2 August 1940 – Sqn Ldr (maj) Zdzisław Krasnodębski
- 7 September 1940 – F/O (lt.) Witold Urbanowicz
- 22 October 1940 – F/O (lt.) Zdzisław Henneberg
- 7 November 1940 – Sqn Ldr (cpt.) Adam Kowalczyk
- 20 February 1941 – Sqn Ldr (lt.) Zdzisław Henneberg
- 13 April 1941 – F/Lt (lt.) Tadeusz Arentowicz
- 5 May 1941 – Sqn Ldr (cpt.) Wacław Łapkowski
- 3 July 1941 – Sqn Ldr (cpt.) Tadeusz Arentowicz
- 9 July 1941 – Sqn Ldr (cpt.) Jerzy Jankiewicz
- 21 November 1941 – Sqn Ldr (lt.) Wojciech Kołaczkowski
- 7 May 1942 – Sqn Ldr (cpt.) Walerian Żak
- 19 May 1942 – Sqn Ldr (lt.) Jan Zumbach
- 1 December 1942 – Sqn Ldr(lt.) Zygmunt Witymir Bieńkowski
- 4 July 1943 – Sqn Ldr (cpt.) Jan Falkowski
- 21 November 1943 – Sqn Ldr (cpt.) Tadeusz Koc
- 25 September 1944 – Sqn Ldr (cpt.) Bolesław Drobiński
- 1 February 1946 – Sqn Ldr (maj) Witold Łokuciewski

== Pilots of 303 ==
- Squadron Leader R G Kellett DSO DFC Original CO of 303 Sqn.
- Flight Lieutenant John A. Kent, Canadian Flight commander during the Battle, (11 claims)
- Sgt Josef František, Czech pilot flying with 303 Polish Squadron, was one of the top fighter pilots of the Battle of Britain, with 17 confirmed kills.
- Flying Officer Witold Urbanowicz, Polish commander of 303 Squadron from 5 September 1940, scored 15 kills during the Battle of Britain (17 or 19 + 1 + 0 total)
- Pilot Officer Jan Zumbach, commander of 303 Squadron from 19 May 1942, scored 8 kills during the Battle of Britain (12 1/3 + 5 + 1 total)

List of pilots of No. 303 Polish "Kościuszko" Fighter Squadron
Tadeusz Andruszków | Zenon Bartkowiak | Henryk Bieniek | Marian Bełc | Michał Brzezowski | Arsen Cebrzyński | Jan Daszewski | Mirosław Ferić | Athol Forbes | Josef František | Paweł Gallus | Bogdan Grzeszczak |Eugeniusz Horbaczewski | Wojciech Januszewicz | Józef Kania | Stanisław Karubin | John Kent | Bronisław Kłosin | Wojciech Kołaczkowski | Tadeusz Kołecki | Jan Kowalski | Henryk Karasinski W/O Srgt 1940 -1945. | Romuald Knobelsdorf Srgt | Karol Krawczyński | Zbygniew Kustrzynski | Bogusław Mierzwa | Włodzimierz Miksa | Tadeusz Opulski | Jan Palak | Jerzy Palusiński | Ludwik Witold Paszkiewicz | Edward Paterek | Stanisław Pietraszkiewicz | Marian Pisarek | Mieczysław Popek | Jerzy Radomski | Jan Rogowski | Aleksander Rokitnicki | Tadeusz Sawicz | Henryk Skowron | Stanisław Słowikowski | Bronislaw Sikora | Antoni Siudak | Stanisław Socha | Józef Stasik Wladyslaw Raubo | Eugeniusz Szaposznikow | Mirosław Wojciechowski | Stefan Wojtowicz | Kazimierz Wunsche | Stanisław Zdanowski | Edward W. Martens | Witold A. Herbst | Bronislaw Zborowski

== Squadron aircraft ==
- 8 August 1940 – Hurricane I
- 22 January 1941 – Spitfire I
- 3 March 1941 – Spitfire IIA
- 20 May 1941 – Spitfire IIB
- 25 August 1941 – Spitfire I
- 7 October 1941 – Spitfire VB
- 1 June 1943 – Spitfire F IXC.
- 12 November 1943 – Spitfire VB, Spitfire VC and Spitfire LF VB, Spitfire LF VC
- 18 July 1944 – Spitfire F IX, Spitfire LF IX and Spitfire HF IX
- 4 April 1945 – Mustang IV and Mustang IVA.

== In popular culture ==
The squadron was the subject of the 1942 book Squadron 303, written by the Polish writer Arkady Fiedler, which is considered the most popular among this writer's many works and has sold over 1.5 million copies.

Because the book was published during the war, in order to protect the Polish airmen and their families remaining in occupied Poland from German reprisals, Fiedler used pseudonyms for the airmen of 303 Squadron. This practice was mandated in a memo regarding confidential information issued by the Air Ministry dated Oct. 14, 1949. In connection with the 70th anniversary of the Battle of Britain in 2010, a new English translation was commissioned by publisher Aquila Polonica at the request of Fiedler's son. 303 Squadron: The Legendary Battle of Britain Fighter Squadron is the first new English-language edition of Dywizjon 303 since 1942, and for the first time in English identifies the pilots by their true names.

In 2010, the squadron's involvement in the Battle of Britain was featured in the dramatised documentary The Polish Battle of Britain produced by Hardy Pictures for the Channel 4 series Bloody Foreigners. Channel Four also made a game called Battle of Britain: 303 Squadron.

303 Squadron was the subject of the 2018 films Hurricane and 303 Squadron.

303 Squadron is referenced in the first chorus of the Sabaton song Aces in Exile.

Museum 303 in Napoleon, Silesia Province, Poland is dedicated to No. 303 Squadron.

== See also ==
- 2018 film Hurricane: 303 Squadron (aka Mission of Honor)
- 1969 film Battle of Britain
- Air Force of the Polish Army
- List of Royal Air Force aircraft squadrons
- Non-British personnel in the RAF during the Battle of Britain
- Polish Air Forces
- Polish Air Forces in Great Britain
- Polish British
- Polish contribution to World War II
- Western betrayal

== Citations ==
=== Bibliography ===
- Anders, Władysław (1949). An Army in Exile. London: MacMillan & Co.
- Caldwell, Donald. The JG26 War Diary, Vol. 1: 1939–1942. London: Grub Street, 1996. ISBN 978-1-898697-52-7.
- Cumft, Olgierd; Kujawa, Hubert (1989). Polscy piloci myśliwscy polegli w latach 1940–1946 [Book of Polish pilots who died, died and disappeared 1939-1946] (in Polish). Warsaw: Wydawn. Ministerstwa Obrony Narodowej. ISBN 83-11-07329-5.
- Cynk, Jerzy B. (1998). The Polish Air Force at War: The Official History, 1939-1943. Atglen, Pennsylvania: Schiffer Publishing. ISBN 0-7643-0559-X.
- Cynk, Jerzy B. The Polish Air Force at War: The Official History, 1943–1945. Atglen, Pennsylvania: Schiffer Publishing, 1998. ISBN 0-7643-0560-3.
- Ken Delve, D-Day: The Air Battle, London: Arms & Armour Press, 1994, ISBN 1-85409-227-8.
- Fiedler, Arkady. Dywizjon 303 (in Polish). London: Peter Davies Ltd., 1942. (Translated as Squadron 303: The Polish Fighter Squadron with the R.A.F.. London: Peter Davies Ltd., 1942/New York: Roy Publishers, 1943. Reprint Kessinger Publishing, 2007.) New edition 303 Squadron: The Legendary Battle of Britain Fighter Squadron translated by Jarek Garliński. Los Angeles: Aquila Polonica, 2010 hard cover: ISBN 978-1-60772-004-1 Trade paperback ISBN 978-1-60772-005-8.
- Gretzyngier, Robert. Poles in Defence of Britain: A Day-by-Day Chronology of Polish Day and Night Fighter Operations, July 1940 – June 1941. London: Grub Street, 2001. ISBN 1-902304-54-3.
- Gretzyngier, Robert. Polskie Skrzydła 4: Hawker Hurricane, część 1 (in Polish). Sandomierz, Poland: Stratus, 2005. ISBN 83-89450-37-2.
- Gretzyngier, Robert; Matusiak, Wojtek (1998). Polish Aces of World War 2. London: Osprey. ISBN 1855327260.
- Halley, James J. The Squadrons of the Royal Air Force & Commonwealth, 1918–1988. Tonbridge, Kent, UK: Air-Britain (Historians) Ltd., 1988. ISBN 0-85130-164-9.
- Jefford, C.G. RAF Squadrons, a Comprehensive Record of the Movement and Equipment of all RAF Squadrons and their Antecedents since 1912. Shrewsbury, UK: Airlife Publishing, 2001. ISBN 1-84037-141-2.
- King, Richard; Siwek, Grzegorz (2012). Wydawnictwo RM (ed.). Dywizjon 303 walka i codzienność [303 squadron: fight and everyday life] (in Polish). Warsaw: Wydawnictwo RM. ISBN 978-83-7243-979-6.
- Olson, Lynne; Cloud, Stanley (2003). A Question of Honor. The Kosciuszko Squadron: Forgotten Heroes of World War II. New York: Knopf. ISBN 0-375-41197-6..
- Ramsay, Winston, Ed. (1989). The Battle of Britain Then and Now, Mk V. London: Battle of Britain Prints International Ltd. ISBN 0-900913-46-0.
- Rawlings, John D.R. (1978) [1969]. Fighter Squadrons of the RAF and their Aircraft (Revised reprinted ed.). London: Macdonald & Jane's (Publishers) Ltd. ISBN 0-354-01028-X.
- Zaloga, Steven J.; Hook, Richard (1982). The Polish Army 1939-45. London: Osprey Publishing. ISBN 0-85045-417-4.
- Zamoyski, Adam (1995). The Forgotten Few: The Polish Air Force in the Second World War. New York: Hippocrene Books Inc. ISBN 0781804213.
