= 112th Fighter Escadrille =

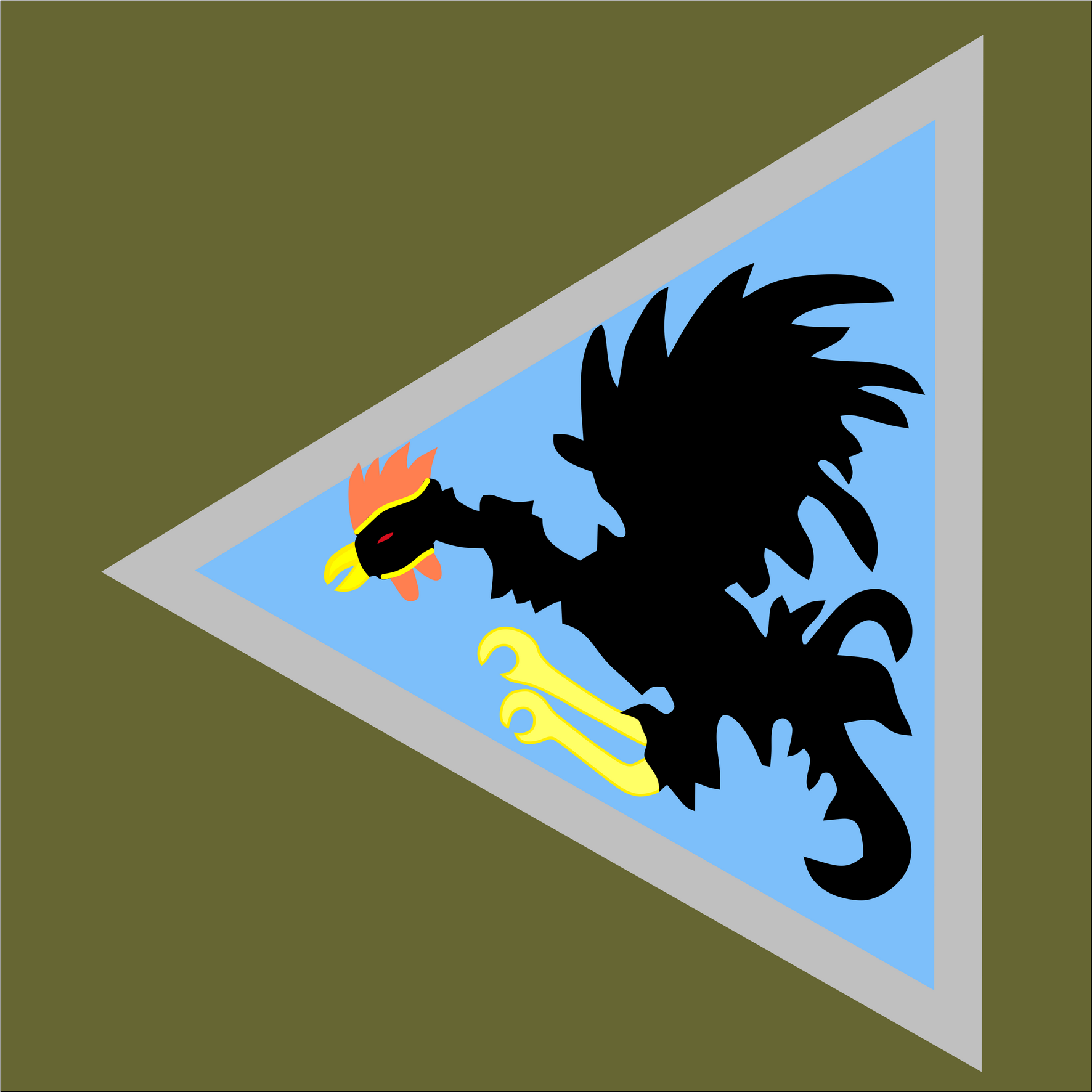
- The insignia found on the side their of planes.
- Active: 1919-1939
- Country: Poland
- Allegiance: Poland
- Branch: Polish Air Forces
- Role: Fighter Squadron
- Engagements: Invasion of Poland

Commanders
- Notable commanders: Tadeusz Opulski

The 112th Fighter Escadrille of the Polish Air Force (Polish: 112. Eskadra Myśliwska) was one of the fighter units of the Polish Army.

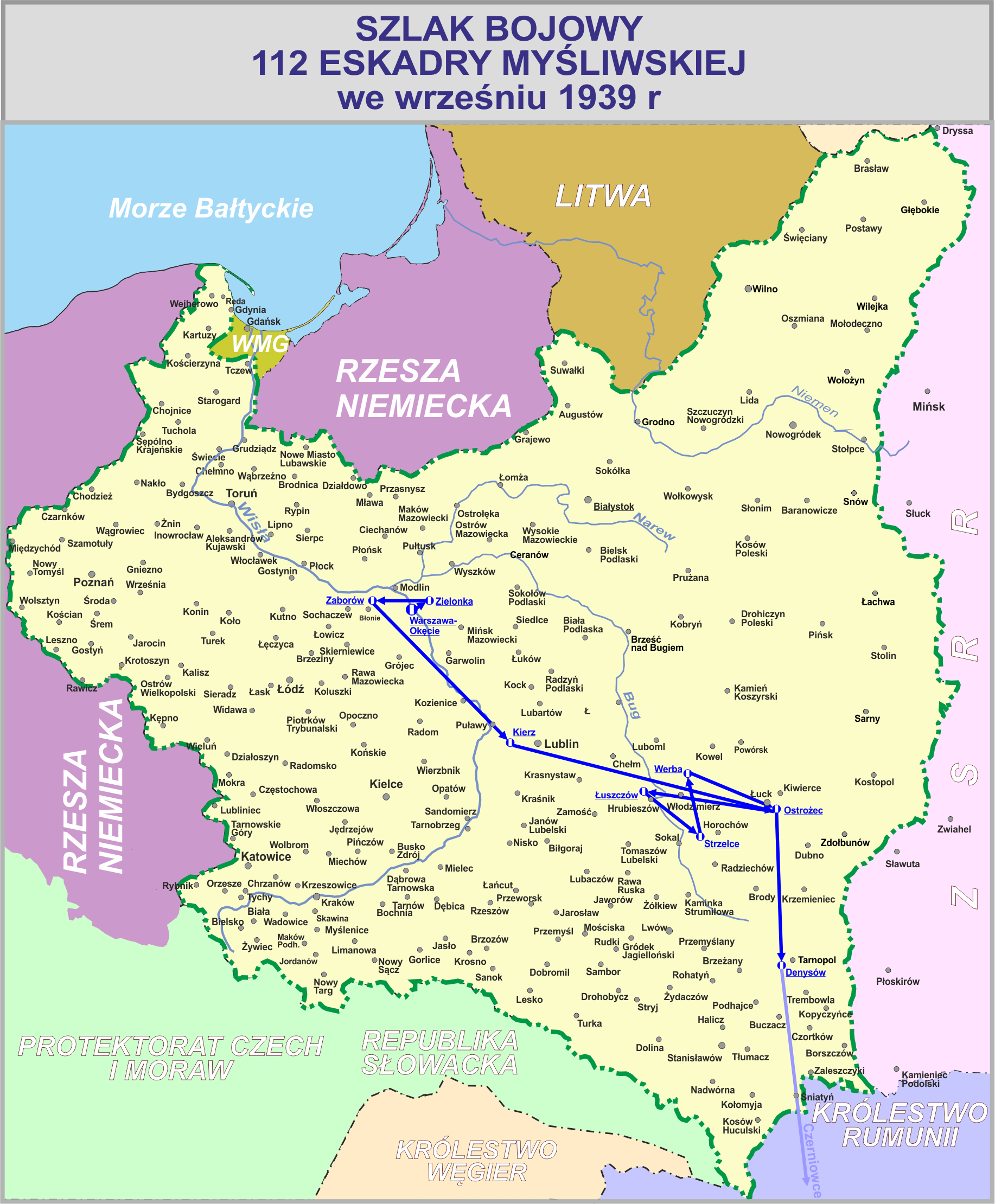

== History ==
The Escadrille was created in 1919 by a merger of the earlier 18th Reconnaissance Escadrille and the 19th Fighter Escadrille.

In September 1939 the 112th Fighter Escadrille was incorporated into the Pursuit Brigade.

== Crew and equipment ==
On 1 September 1939 the escadrille had 10 planes: 6 PZL P.11c and 4 PZL P.11a.

The air crew consisted of: commanding officer captain Tadeusz Opulski, his deputy Lieutenant Stefan Stanisław Okrzeja, and 15 other pilots:

1. por. Wacław Łapkowski
2. ppor. Jan Daszewski
3. ppor. Witold Łokuciewski
4. ppor. Wiktor Strzembosz
5. pchor. Janusz Marciniak
6. pchor. Władysław Nowakowski
7. pchor. Antoni Polek
8. plut. Karol Krawczyński
9. plut. Ludwik Lech
10. kpr. Bernard Ryszard Górecki
11. kpr. Jan Musiał
12. st. szer. Paweł Gallus
13. st. szer. Leon Nowak
14. st. szer. Zygmunt Rozworski
15. st. szer. Władysław Wieraszka

== See also ==
- Polish Air Force order of battle in 1939
