= Stanisław Karubin =

Polish fighter ace

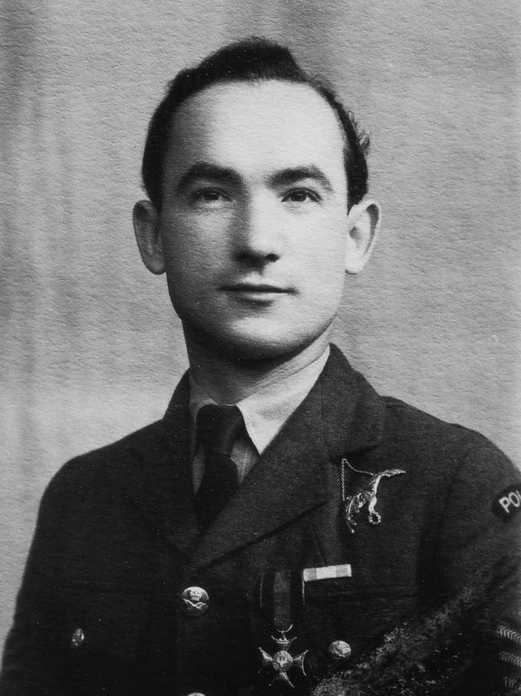
- A portrait of Stanisław Karubin
- Born: 29 October 1915; Woźniki, German Empire (present-day Poland)
- Died: 12 August 1941 (aged 25); Horn Crag Eskdale, Cumbria
- Military career
- Allegiance: Poland; France; United Kingdom
- Branch: Polish Air Force (France) Armée de l'Air; Royal Air Force
- Rank: Sergeant
- Service number: 793420
- Units: 111th Fighter Escadrille (Poland); No. 303 Polish Fighter Squadron
- Conflicts: Polish Defensive War, World War II
- Awards: Virtuti Militari; Cross of Valour; Distinguished Flying Medal

Stanisław Karubin (29 October 1915 – 12 August 1941) was a Polish fighter ace of the Polish Air Force in World War II with 7 confirmed kills.

== Biography ==
Karubin after graduating from Non-Commissioned Officer's School for minors was assigned to the 111th Fighter Escadrille. On 3 September 1939 he shot down his first plane, a Bf 110. On 23 January 1940 he arrived in France via Romania and Greece. He served in the Krasnodębski section of the Groupe de Chasse et de Défense I/55, on 3 June he downed a Do 17 or a Do 215. After the capitulation of France he came to the UK. He took part in the Battle of Britain in the No. 303 Polish Fighter Squadron and destroyed 5 German aircraft. On 6 September 1940 he was hit and jumped with a parachute. On 18 September he received the Virtuti Militari. He was sent to No. 55 Operational Training Unit RAF. On 12 August 1941, flying in the clouds, Karubin struck a mountainside, at the same way also died another Polish pilot, Zygmunt Höhne.

== Aerial victory credits ==
- Bf 110 - 3 September 1939
- Do 17 or Do-215 - 3 June 1940
- Bf 109 - 31 August 1940
- 2 Bf 109 - 5 September 1940
- He 111 - 6 September 1940
- Bf 109 - 5 October 1940

== Awards ==
Virtuti Militari, Silver Cross
Cross of Valour (Poland), three times
Distinguished Flying Medal
