= Athol Forbes =

British flying ace of WWII

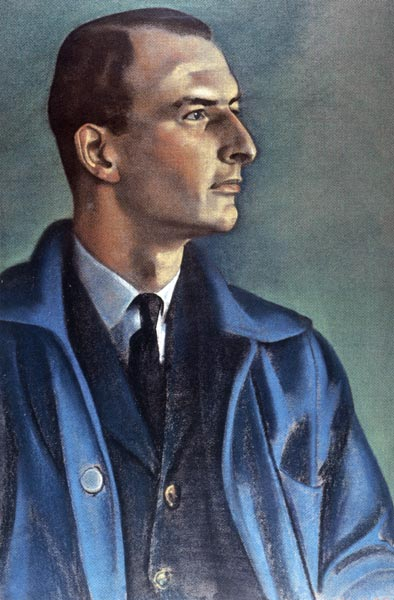
- Portrait of Athol Forbes, made by the official war artist Eric Kennington in 1940
- Born: 4 April 1912; London, England
- Died: 18 August 1981 (aged 69); Stratford-upon-Avon, England
- Military career
- Allegiance: United Kingdom
- Branch: Royal Air Force
- Service years: 1935–1948
- Rank: Group Captain
- Commands: No. 165 Wing; No. 66 Squadron
- Conflicts: Second World War: Battle of Britain; Circus offensive; Arakan campaign
- Awards: Officer of the Order of the British Empire; Distinguished Flying Cross & Bar; Silver Cross of the War Order of Virtuti Militari (Poland)

Athol Forbes, OBE, DFC & Bar (4 April 1912 – 18 August 1981) was a British flying ace who served in the Royal Air Force (RAF) during the Second World War. He was credited with having shot down at least nine aircraft.

Born in London, Forbes joined the RAF in 1935. After completing his training, he served as an instructor at the School of Army Co-operation. The year after the outbreak of the Second World War, he was posted to No. 303 Squadron, which was composed mostly of Polish flying personnel. Forbes was involved in the training to bring the squadron up to operational standard. From September, he flew extensively during the Battle of Britain, achieving most of his aerial victories, but also being wounded twice. He was subsequently awarded the Distinguished Flying Cross and the Polish honour of the Silver Cross of the War Order of Virtuti Militari for his service with the squadron. From mid-October 1940, he commanded No. 66 Squadron for a year. He spent most of the remainder of the war serving in India as a wing leader and staff officer. He left the RAF in 1948 as a group captain and later worked in civil aviation. He died at Stratford-upon-Avon at the age of 69.

== Early life ==
Athol Stanhope Forbes was born on 4 April 1912 in London, England, although one source indicates Stratford-upon-Avon as his place of birth. The son of William and Isabella Forbes, he was educated at Dover College, where one of his fellow students was John Hamar Hill who, like Forbes, would become a fighter pilot in the Royal Air Force (RAF).

Forbes joined the RAF on a short service commission in 1935, commencing his initial training in November of that year. He was commissioned as an acting pilot officer in January 1936 and the following month commenced flight training at No. 10 Flying Training School at Ternhill. He went on more advanced training at the School of Army Co-operation, at Old Sarum. He was confirmed in his pilot officer rank in November. Upon completion of his course at Old Sarum in August 1937, he was retained as an instructor. He was promoted to flying officer in May 1938.

== Second World War ==
Forbes was still instructing at the School of Army Co-operation at the time of the outbreak of the Second World War, and it was not until July 1940 that he was sent to No. 6 Operational Training Unit at Sutton Bridge for a refresher course on fighters. By this time, he held the rank of flight lieutenant, having been promoted in May 1940.

=== Battle of Britain ===
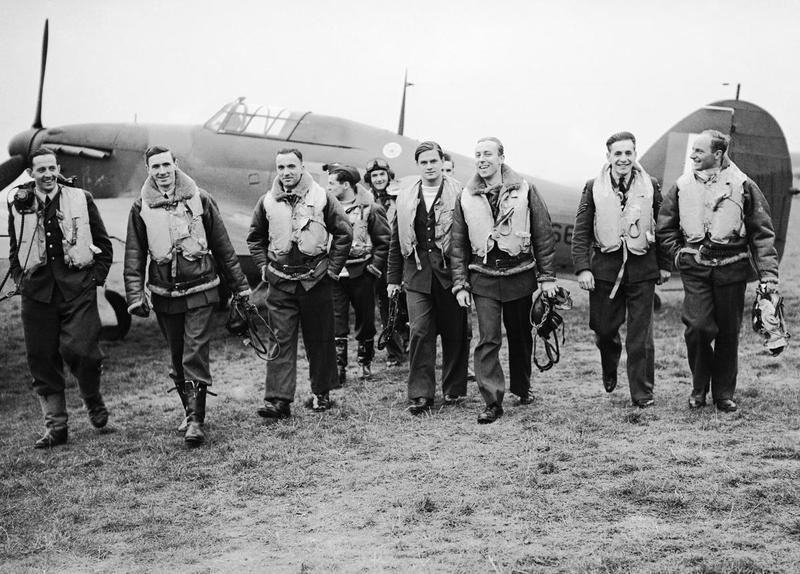
Pilots of No. 303 Squadron in front of a Hawker Hurricane fighter, October 1940

Posted to No. 303 Squadron, based at Northolt in early August, Forbes was one of its flight commanders, the other being the Canadian pilot John Kent. Apart from the squadron's commander, Squadron Leader Ronald Kellett, the remaining flying personnel being Polish pilots, many of whom could speak little or no English although all could converse in French. Equipped with the Hawker Hurricane fighter, the squadron was part of No. 11 Group but was still in training. According to Kent, Forbes was fluent in French, which helped the Polish pilots familiarise themselves with RAF procedures and practices. The squadron became operational in late August and was drawn into the aerial fighting over the southeast of England.

Forbes first aerial victory was achieved on 4 September, when he shot down a Junkers Ju 88 medium bomber near Thameshaven. This was one of seven claims made by No. 303 Squadron pilots that day. The following day he destroyed a Messerschmitt Bf 109 fighter and claimed another as probably destroyed, both over Sevenoaks, but he in turn was attacked by Bf 109s and his Hurricane damaged. He had to crashland back at Northolt, and received minor injuries in doing so. Despite this, he returned to operations on 7 September, shooting down a Dornier Do 17 medium bomber over Essex. He was slightly wounded in the engagement and had to make a forced landing. Kellett and Kent had also been slightly wounded the same day so henceforth, it was decided that only one of the squadron's British officer would fly at a time, which meant that on occasion, Forbes would lead it on scrambles to intercept incoming Luftwaffe raids.

Returning to duty with No. 303 Squadron with minimal rest, Forbes destroyed two Do 17s over Horsham on 11 September but was again wounded. The damage to his Hurricane was such that he had to land at Heston Aerodrome. He shot down a Heinkel He 111 medium bomber on 26 September over Portsmouth and the next day destroyed another He 111 near Horsham. His squadron, the most successful in No. 11 Group for September, was rested on 11 October, being sent to Leconfield. Shortly afterwards Forbes was promoted to acting squadron leader and on 17 October was posted to command of No. 66 Squadron. A few days later, he was awarded the Distinguished Flying Cross (DFC), in recognition of his recent successes in the Battle of Britain. The published citation read:

This officer is a splendid leader and has contributed materially to the many successes obtained by his squadron. He has displayed great keenness in pressing home his attacks against the enemy and has destroyed seven of their aircraft.

— London Gazette, No. 34976, 22 October 1940

Subsequently, the Polish government-in-exile awarded Forbes its Silver Cross of the War Order of Virtuti Militari in further recognition of his leadership role with No. 303 Squadron. His new squadron, No. 66 Squadron, was stationed at West Malling and operated Supermarine Spitfire fighters. As part of No. 11 Group, it was still engaged in the aerial fighting in the southeast of England although the Luftwaffe's operations were on the decline.

=== Circus offensive ===
Due to poor weather, No. 66 Squadron flew few sorties over the peak of the winter months. After reequipping with the latest version of the Spitfire, in February 1941 it was sent to Exeter, where it was tasked with patrolling duties. Forbes shared in the destruction of a He 111 on 25 June, seeing it go down off Bolt Head. From August, the squadron regularly flew to German-occupied Europe, escorting bombers and using Coltishall as a staging post. On one of these, carried out on 20 August, shared in shooting down a Bf 109. In early November he was awarded a Bar to his DFC. The published citation read:

This officer has participated in numerous operational sorties during the last five months. In addition to many arduous convoy patrols he has led wing formations as escort to bombers on missions over France; he has also carried out many attacks on enemy ground targets with a large measure of success. Squadron Leader Forbes has always shown the greatest keenness to engage the enemy and has undoubtedly contributed materially to the high standard of operational efficiency of the squadron. At his own request he has been permitted to make long flights out over the sea, alone in an endeavour to engage enemy aircraft.

— London Gazette, No. 35334, 4 November 1941

=== Later war service ===
At the time Forbes was awarded the Bar to his DFC, he was on staff duties at the headquarters of No. 10 Group, having relinquished command of No. 66 Squadron in October. He was promoted to temporary squadron leader on 1 December 1941. In April 1942, he was sent to the Far East to serve with No. 224 Group in Calcutta. From October he commanded No. 165 Wing, leading it during the Arakan campaign. He was promoted to wing commander in July 1943, by which time he was serving at the headquarters of No. 222 Group. In the 1944 New Year Honours, he was appointed an Officer of the Order of the British Empire; the citation noted his services during the Arakan campaign. From August, Forbes served as the Senior Air Staff Officer at the headquarters of No. 221 Group at Imphal.

Forbes ended the war credited with the destruction of nine German aircraft, two of which being shared with other pilots. He was also credited with one aircraft as probably destroyed.

== Later life ==
Forbes remained in the RAF until 1948, by which time he held the rank of group captain. Returning to civilian life, he worked for Cameroons Air Transport as the company's operations manager. When he retired, he and his wife Ernestine, who he had married in April 1939, moved to Alcester, in Warwickshire. He died while receiving hospital care at Stratford-upon-Avon on 18 August 1981.
