= Squadron 303 (book) =

Book by Arkady Fiedler

- Cover of 1946 edition (publ. Czytelnik)
- Author: Arkady Fiedler
- Language: English
- Subject: Military history
- Genre: Non-fiction
- Publisher: Peter Davies
- Publication date: August 1942
- Publication place: England
- Media type: Print (hardcover)

Squadron 303 (Polish: Dywizjon 303) is a non-fiction book written by Polish author Arkady Fiedler and published by Peter Davies. It became his most popular book, selling over 1.5 million copies. Written in 1940, published in August 1942, the book is about the legendary No. 303 ("Kościuszko") Polish Squadron (Polish: 303 Dywizjon Myśliwski "Warszawski im. Tadeusza Kościuszki") of Polish Air Force fighter pilots who flew with Great Britain's Royal Air Force (R.A.F.) during the Battle of Britain.

No. 303 ("Kościuszko") Polish Squadron continued the traditions of the earlier Polish 7th Air Escadrille (Polish: 7. Eskadra Lotnicza) or "Kościuszko Squadron", as it was better known, which was one of the most active units of the Polish Air Force during the Polish-Soviet War of 1919-1921. Formed in late 1918, Polish 7th Air Escadrille was re-formed in late 1919 from American volunteers, initially commanded by Cedric Fauntleroy, then by Merian Cooper (who originally recruited the American pilots for this unit).

== Background ==
Author Arkady Fiedler was a bestselling travel writer researching in Tahiti when World War II began. He made his way back to Europe and joined the Polish Army in France after Poland had fallen to the Germans. Fiedler managed to get to England with the other Polish forces after the fall of France, where he saw all the attention that the Polish pilots of 303 Squadron were getting from the British press—they were the highest-scoring Allied fighter squadron in the Battle of Britain. Fiedler recognized that their story would make a great book.

He undertook to chronicle the extraordinary achievements of No. 303 (Polish) Squadron during the Battle of Britain with the blessing of Polish Prime Minister and Commander-in-Chief Władysław Sikorski.

Arkady Fiedler began writing 303 Squadron “live” during the Battle of Britain, spending time with the Polish pilots and ground crew of No. 303 Squadron at their base at RAF Northolt, West London, England. He wrote the book in Polish under the title Dywizjon 303. It was translated into English by Jarek Garlinski and published in Great Britain in 1942 (where it went through several printings), and in the United States in 1943.

A clandestine edition of Dywizjon 303 was parachuted into German-occupied Poland in 1943. Copies duplicated by the Polish Underground were secretly passed from person to person. The account of the successes of their fighter pilots, fighting in distant lands for freedom, boosted morale in the beleaguered country. The book inspired soldier-poet Czesław ‘Czechura’ Kałkusiński, serving with a forest partisan unit of the AK (Armia Krajowa) in the Częstochowa region, to write a poem entitled “303 Squadron” which was set to music by his fellow soldier Henryk ‘Garda’ Fajt, and soon found its way to London via the Polish Underground where it was played over the BBC and heard by Polish airmen serving in Great Britain.

Dywizjon 303 became a classic in Poland. It is one of mandatory lectures for Polish schoolchildren, and has gone through numerous Polish editions.

In connection with the 70th anniversary of the Battle of Britain in 2010, a new English translation was commissioned by publisher Aquila Polonica at the request of Fiedler's son. This is the first new English-language edition of Dywizjon 303 since 1942. It contains nearly 200 historic photos, maps and other illustrations and supplemental material to set the story in historical context. Winner of the 2011 Benjamin Franklin Gold Award for History and Silver Award for Interior Design (1-2 Colour).

In "Flying" magazine, Lane Wallace noted, "Typically, fighter pilot stories are written either by individual surviving pilots or historians after the fact. But the pilots of 303 Squadron had an advantage when it came to recording their adventures accurately as they unfolded: Like Magellan, they had a professional writer assigned to the squadron and tasked with making sure their story wasn't mistold or forgotten".

Writing in The Atlantic about forgotten pieces of World War II history, such as the story of 303 Squadron, Sanjay Saigal asked, "shouldn't cultural literacy include knowing about Polish heroism in the defense of Britain?"

== The changed names ==
Because the book was published during the war, in order to protect the Polish airmen and their families remaining in occupied Poland from German reprisals, Fiedler used pseudonyms for the airmen of 303 Squadron. This practice was mandated in a memo regarding confidential information issued by the Air Ministry dated Oct. 14, 1949. Their true names were revealed in connection with the 70th anniversary of the Battle of Britain in 2010, in the new English translation published by Aquila Polonica, entitled 303 Squadron: The Legendary Battle of Britain Fighter Squadron.

== Publishing history ==
Great Britain

- Dywizjon 303
  Publisher: M.I. Kolin, London, 1942.
- Squadron 303: The story of the Polish Fighter Squadron with the R.A.F.
  Publisher: Peter Davies. London, 1942, 1943, 1945.
- Squadron 303: The story of the Polish Fighter Squadron with the R.A.F.
  Publisher: Letchworth Printers. Letchworth, 1944, 1945.

United States

- Squadron 303: the story of the Polish Fighter Squadron with the R.A.F.
  Publisher: Roy Publishers. New York, 1943.
- 303 Squadron: The Legendary Battle of Britain Fighter Squadron.
  Publisher: Aquila Polonica. Los Angeles, California, 2010.

Canada

- Groupe 303
  Publisher: Les Éditions Variétés, Montréal, 1944.
- Dywizjon 303
  Publisher: Impr. Saint-Joseph. Montréal, 1945.

Poland

- Dywizjon 303
  Publisher: Wydawnictwo Oficyny Polskiej. Warsaw, 1943.
- Dywizjon 303
  Publisher: Towarzystwo Wydawnicze Załoga. Warsaw, 1943.
- Dywizjon 303
  Publisher: Oficyna Polska. Warsaw, 1943.
- Dywizjon 303
  Publisher: Wydawnictwo Ruchu Miecz i Pług. Warsaw, 1943.
- Dywizjon 303
  Publisher: "Chrobry Szlak". Kielce, 1944.
- Dywizjon 303
  Publisher: Czytelnik. Kraków, 1946.
- Dywizjon 303
  Publisher: ISKRY. Warsaw, 1956, 1957, 1957, 1958, 1960.
- Dywizjon 303
  Publisher: Wydawnictwo Poznańskie. Poznań. 1965, 1968, 1970, 1971, 1972, 1974, 1975, 1978, 1980, 1983, 1984, 1985, 1989, 1990.
- Dywizjon 303
  Publisher: Siedmioróg. Wrocław, 1993, 1996.
- Dywizjon 303
  Publisher: Wydawnictwo "Bernardinum" Sp. z.o.o. Pelplin, 2009, 2018.

Argentina

- Dywizjon 303
  Publisher: Osadnik. Pasadas, 1945.

Germany

- Staffel 303: Die polnischen Jagdflieger in der Luftschlacht um England.
  Publisher: Staffel-303-verlag. Bochum, 2010.

Audio Book

Poland

- Dywizjon 303
  Narrated by Tomasz Marzecki. Publisher: Storybox.
