= Hurricane (2018 film) =

- Theatrical release poster
- Directed by: David Blair
- Screenplay by: Alastair Galbraith; Robert Ryan
- Produced by: Krystian Kozlowski; Matthew Whyte
- Starring: Iwan Rheon; Milo Gibson; Stefanie Martini; Marcin Dorociński; Kryštof Hádek; Christopher Jaciow
- Cinematography: Piotr Sliskowski
- Edited by: Sean Barton
- Music by: Laura Rossi
- Production companies: Lipsync Productions; Prospect 3; Stray Dog Films
- Distributed by: Kaleidoscope Film Distribution (Theatrical); Kino Świat (Poland)
- Release dates: August 9, 2018 (Poland); September 7, 2018 (Worldwide)
- Running time: 123 minutes
- Country: United Kingdom
- Languages: English; Polish
- Budget: $10 million
- Box office: $2.1 million

Hurricane, also known as Hurricane: 303 Squadron, and as Mission of Honor in the United States, is a 2018 biographical war film, produced by Krystian Kozlowski and Matthew Whyte, directed by David Blair, and written by Alastair Galbraith and Robert Ryan. The film stars Iwan Rheon, with Milo Gibson, Stefanie Martini, Marcin Dorociński, Kryštof Hádek and Christopher Jaciow in supporting roles. Hurricane depicts the experiences of a group of Polish pilots of No. 303 Squadron RAF (Dywizjon 303) in the Battle of Britain in the Second World War. The film had its premiere in Warsaw, Poland on 17 August 2018. It was released in the UK on the 7 September 2018.

The movie debuted at almost exactly the same time as the Polish production 303 Squadron, also about the history of the air unit.

== Plot ==
The pilots of No. 303 Squadron RAF, part of the Free Polish Air Force, have escaped from Europe, following the Nazi invasions of Poland and France, to join the Royal Air Force. Czech Josef František, refusing to become a bomber pilot, invites himself into the newly formed unit. Canadian RAF pilot John Kent, who became affectionately known as "Kentowski", has his work cut out for him when he is handed the angry and often maligned squadron to command. Piloting Hawker Hurricane fighter aircraft, 303 Squadron works through language barriers, cultural differences and their grief on the loss of loved ones to become highly effective in the Battle of Britain. At the conclusion, the Polish pilots are told that they will be repatriated to communist Poland.

== Cast ==
- Iwan Rheon as Jan Zumbach
- Milo Gibson as John A. Kent
- Stefanie Martini as Phyllis Lambert
- Kryštof Hádek as Josef František
- Marcin Dorociński as Witold Urbanowicz
- Christopher Jaciow as Zdzisław Henneberg
- Nicholas Farrell as Sir Hugh Dowding
- Robert Portal as Keith Park
- Sam Hoare as Kellett
- Teresa Mahoney as McCormac

== Production ==
The script is not a historical depiction of all events. One news item provided this comment after researching the content of the film and the actual history: "the film attempted to stick close to fact, but the needs of dramatic action often swayed the plot into fictitious and occasionally unrealistic narratives".

In late 2017 and early 2018, some scenes were shot on the Kentish coast at Stone Bay and Victoria Gardens in Broadstairs.

== Reception ==
On Rotten Tomatoes, the film (as Mission of Honor) has an approval rating of 86% based on reviews from seven critics, with an average rating of 5.8/10.

The review in The Guardian was mixed, with a 3/5 rating. Leslie Felperin made this concluding comment: "The lack of budget, relative to Dunkirk at least, is glaring in the aerial dogfights, and the score is too maudlin and on the nose, but director David Blair navigates the whole thing through the storm with watchable competence".

== Home media ==
Mission of Honor was released April 30, 2019, by Cinedigm on Region A Blu-ray, DVD, and streaming video.
