= Mirosław Ferić =

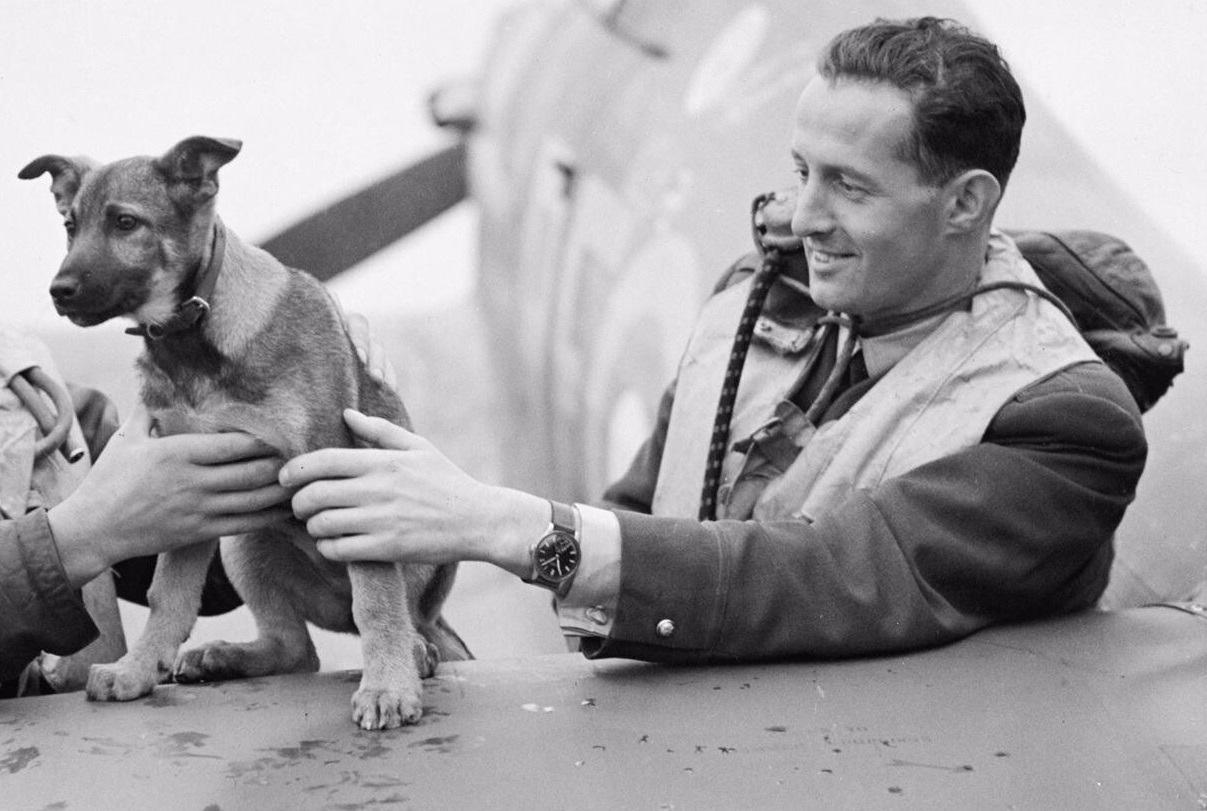
- Born: 17 June 1915; Travnik, Bosnia and Herzegovina, Austria-Hungary
- Died: 14 February 1942 (aged 26); Northolt, Middlesex, England
- Military career
- Allegiance: Poland; France; United Kingdom
- Branch: Polish Air Force (France) Armée de l'Air; Royal Air Force
- Service years: 1938-1942
- Rank: Flight Lieutenant
- Service number: P-1387
- Units: 111th Fighter Escadrille; No. 303 Polish Fighter Squadron
- Conflicts: Polish Defensive War, World War II
- Awards: Virtuti Militari; Cross of Valour; Distinguished Flying Cross (UK)

Mirosław Ferić (17 June 1915 – 14 February 1942), was a Polish-Croatian fighter pilot, a flying ace of World War II.

== Early life ==
Ferić was born in Travnik in Bosnia and Herzegovina, his father was a Bosnian Croat (who died during World War I) and his mother was a Pole. In 1919 his family moved to Poland. He graduated in 1938 from the Polish Air Force Academy in Dęblin as a fighter pilot, and served with fighter escadre No. 111 with a rank of podporucznik pilot (2nd Lt. pilot).

== War service ==
During the Invasion of Poland in 1939, he served with Escadre No. 111, assigned to the Pursuit Brigade (Brygada Poscigowa) and defending the Warsaw area. On 3 September his PZL P.11c fighter was damaged in combat but he successfully bailed out. During the campaign he shot down a Hs 126 on 8 September as a 'shared' victory (other sources also credit him with a Bf 110 shared with others, but this victory was not officially credited).

On 17 September he and other pilots were ordered to evacuate to Romania. There he was interned, but escaped and travelled to France by sea. After training on French aircraft, he was assigned to a flight using Morane MS-406 fighters, protecting aircraft works around Nantes. However, Ferić saw no air combat. After the fall of France, Ferić evacuated in June 1940 to Great Britain.

After advanced training at an RAF OTU he was assigned to the newly formed Polish No. 303 Polish Fighter Squadron, based at RAF Northolt flying Hawker Hurricanes and entering service in the Battle of Britain on 31 August 1940. On his first day of combat he shot down a Messerschmitt Bf 109. On 2 September he probably shot down another one, but his plane was damaged and he made a forced landing. On 6 September he shot down another Bf 109, and on 15 September a Bf 109 and Bf 110. On 27 September he shot down a Bf 109 and a Heinkel He 111, and on 5 October a Bf 109.

After an operational break the squadron was back in combat in January 1941, flying Supermarine Spitfires on missions over France. On 22 June during a bomber escort he shot down a Bf 109, and on 27 June damaged another. In October he was sent to a six-month rest tour to an Operational Training Unit as an instructor, but after three months he volunteered to return to a combat posting.

Ferić returned to No. 303 Squadron in January 1942. On 14 February, he was killed at RAF Northolt after his Spitfire (BL432) broke up at 3,000 feet (910 m) and the resulting G-forces as the aircraft corkscrewed held him inside and prevented him bailing out. He is buried in Northwood Cemetery, London.

Mirosław Ferić was the 11th ranked Polish fighter ace with 8 and 2/3 confirmed kills and 1 probable kill. From September 1939 he had kept a personal diary, which became No.303 Squadron's unit history.

== Honours and awards ==
Virtuti Militari, Silver Cross (18 September 1940)
Cross of Valour, twice
Distinguished Flying Cross (United Kingdom) (15 December 1940)

== Bibliography ==
- Bristow, Mark. (2005) A History of Royal Air Force Northolt. RAF Northolt: No. 1 AIDU
- Wacław Król: Myśliwcy. Warszawa: Ministerstwo Obrony Narodowej, 1980, pp. 230–256. ISBN 83-11-06396-6.
- Richard King: Dywizjon 303 walka i codzienność. Warszawa: Wydawnictwo RM, 2012, p. 39. ISBN 978-83-7243-979-6.
- Tadeusz Jerzy Krzystek, Anna Krzystek: Polskie Siły Powietrzne w Wielkiej Brytanii w latach 1940-1947 łącznie z Pomocniczą Lotniczą Służbą Kobiet (PLSK-WAAF). Sandomierz: Stratus, 2012, p. 176. ISBN 9788361421597
- Jerzy Pawlak: Polskie eskadry w Wojnie Obronnej 1939. Warszawa: Wydawnictwa Komunikacji i Łączności, 1991 ISBN 8320607957
- Jerzy Pawlak: Absolwenci Szkoły Orląt: 1925-1939. Warszawa: Retro-Art, 2009, p. 177. ISBN 8387992224
- Piotr Sikora: Asy polskiego lotnictwa. Warszawa: Oficyna Wydawnicza Alma-Press. 2014, p. 213-217. ISBN 9788370205607
- Józef Zieliński: Asy polskiego lotnictwa. Warszawa: Agencja lotnicza ALTAIR, 1994, p. 38.
- Józef Zieliński: Lotnicy polscy w Bitwie o Wielką Brytanię. Warszawa: Oficyna Wydawnicza MH, 2005, pp. 46–47. ISBN 8390662043
- Józef Zieliński: 303 Dywizjon Myśliwski Warszawski im. Tadeusza Kościuszki. Warszawa: Bellona, 2003 ISBN 8311096309
