= Wacław Łapkowski =

Polish major and fighter ace (1913–1941)

- Born: 6 November 1913; Daugavpils, Russian Empire
- Died: 2 July 1941 (aged 27); English Channel
- Military career
- Allegiance: Poland; France; United Kingdom
- Branch: Polish Air Force (France) Armée de l'Air; Royal Air Force
- Service years: 1934-1941
- Rank: Major
- Service number: P-1506
- Units: Polish 112th Fighter Escadrille; No. 303 Polish Fighter Squadron
- Commands: Polish 112th Fighter Escadrille; No. 303 Polish Fighter Squadron
- Conflicts: Polish Defensive War; World War II †
- Awards: Virtuti Militari; Cross of Valour

Wacław Łapkowski (6 November 1913 in Dyneburg – 2 July 1941 over the English Channel) was a major in the Polish Air Force and fighter ace during World War II, with 6 confirmed kills and one shared.

== Biography ==
Łapkowski graduated from Polish Air Force Academy in Dęblin in 1934. On 15 August 1934 he was named second lieutenant (podporucznik) and assigned to the Polish 112th Fighter Escadrille. During the Invasion of Poland, on 6 September 1939 he took command of his unit after Stefan Okrzeja died. On 9 September he shot down a He 111. After the September Campaign he was evacuated to France where he was posted to the Opulski section in Romorantin. After the Battle of France, Łapkowski arrived in the UK. On 3 August 1940, he was ordered to the No. 303 Polish Fighter Squadron and took part in the Battle of Britain. On 5 September he downed a Ju 88 but his plane was damaged, Łapkowski wounded, jumped with a parachute. On 5 May 1941, he became commander of his squadron. On 2 July 1941, No. 303, engaged some 60 Bf 109s over Lille. Łapkowski was killed over the English Channel. His body washed up onshore.

Łapkowski was buried in Lombardsijde, Belgium.

== Aerial victory credits ==
- 1/3 He 111 - 6 September 1939
- He 111 - 9 September 1939
- Ju 88 - 5 September 1940
- Bf 109 - 4 June 1941 (damaged)
- Bf 109 - 18 June 1941
- 2 x Bf 109 - 22 June 1941
- Bf 109 - 24 June 1941

== Awards ==
Virtuti Militari, Silver Cross
Cross of Valour (Poland), four times
