= Arkady Fiedler =

Polish writer, journalist and adventurer

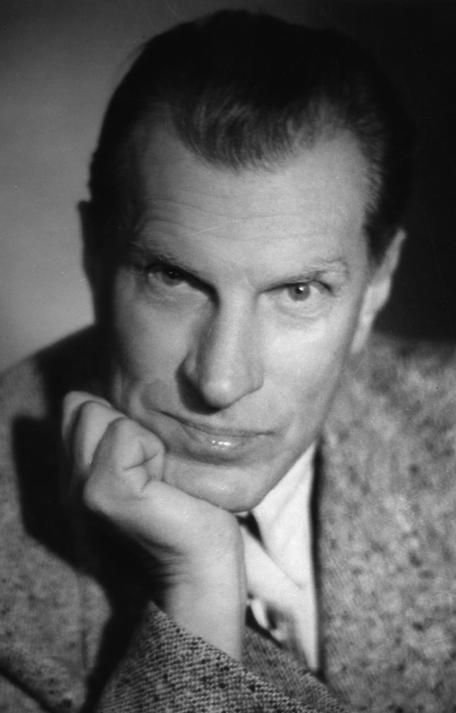
- Born: Arkady Adam Fiedler; 28 November 1894 Poznań, Kingdom of Prussia
- Died: 7 March 1985 (aged 90) Puszczykowo
- Occupation: military man; prose writer; traveler
- Language: Polish
- Period: 20th century
- Notable works: The River Of Singing Fish (1935); Squadron 303 (1940); Robinson Crusoe Island (1954)

Arkady Fiedler (28 November 1894 in Poznań – 7 March 1985 in Puszczykowo) was a Polish writer, journalist and adventurer.

== Life ==
He studied philosophy and natural science at the Jagiellonian University in Kraków and later in Poznań and the University of Leipzig. As an officer of the reserve of the Polish Army, he took part in the Greater Poland Uprising in 1918, was one of the organizers of the Polish Military Organisation from 1918 to 1920.

He travelled to Mexico, Indochina, Brazil, Madagascar, West Africa, Canada and United States, amongst other countries. He wrote 32 books that have been translated into 23 languages and sold over 10 million copies in total. His most famous and popular book, written in 1942, was Squadron 303 about the legendary Kościuszko Squadron fighting during the Battle of Britain; it sold over 1.5 million copies. Thank You, Captain, Thank You! similarly recounts the war efforts of Polish sailors. He wrote books about his travels, documenting cultures, customs and natural wonders. From 1954 he published a historical adventure series for young people.

== Family ==
His family includes his wife Maria, and his two sons who are all alive today. The Arkady Fiedler Museum in Puszczykowo is run by the legacy's proud family.

== Selected list of Arkady Fiedler books translated into the English language ==
- The River of Singing Fish (Ryby śpiewają w Ukajali, 1935) - about Amazonia
- Squadron 303 (Dywizjon 303, 1940)
- Thank You, Captain, Thank You! (Dziękuję ci, kapitanie, 1944)
- The Madagascar I Love

=== Jan Bober series ===
- Robinson Crusoe Island (Wyspa Robinsona, 1954)
- Orinoco (Orinoko, 1957)
- White Jaguar (Biały Jaguar, 1980)

== Travels ==
- 1927 - Northern Norway
- 1928 - Southern Brazil
- 1933 - Amazonia and eastern Peru
- 1935 - Canada
- 1937 - Madagascar (specifically Ambinanitelo)
- 1939 - Tahiti
- 1940 - France, Great Britain
- 1942-1943 - USA, Trinidad, Guiana, Brasil
- 1945 - Canada
- 1948 - Mexico
- 1952-1953 - USSR (Georgia)
- 1956-1957 - Indochina (northern Vietnam, Laos, Cambodia)
- 1959-1960 - Africa (Guinea, Ghana)
- 1961 - North-Western Canada
- 1963-1964 - Brazil, Guiana
- 1965-1966 - Madagascar
- 1967 - Brazil
- 1968 - USSR (eastern Siberia)
- 1969 - Nigeria
- 1970 - Peru
- 1971 - West Africa
- 1972 - Canada (British Columbia, Alberta, Quebec)
- 1973 - South America
- 1975 - Canada (Ontario, Quebec)
- 1976-1977 - West Africa
- 1978-1979 - Peru
- 1980 - Canada
- 1981 - West Africa
