= Zdzisław Henneberg =

Polish fighter pilot (1911–1941)

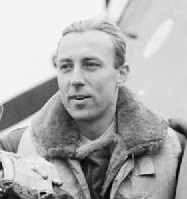
- Zdzisław Henneberg
- Born: 11 May 1911; Warsaw, Kingdom of Poland
- Died: 12 May 1941 (aged 30); English Channel, off Dungeness, England
- Military career
- Allegiance: Poland
- Branch: Polish Air Force; Royal Air Force
- Service years: 1931-1941
- Rank: Flight Lieutenant
- Service number: P1393
- Unit: No. 303 Squadron RAF
- Commands: No. 303 Squadron RAF
- Conflicts: World War II: Battle of France; Battle of Britain
- Awards: Virtuti Militari, Distinguished Flying Cross, Krzyz Zaslugi (Triple Bar), Croix de Guerre

Zdzisław Karol Henneberg VM, DFC, KZ***, CdeG (11 May 1911 – 12 April 1941) was a Polish airman who flew with the Royal Air Force during the Battle of Britain and a flying ace of the Second World War.

== Early life and career ==
Henneberg was born on 11 May 1914 in Warsaw. He graduated from the VIIIth Polish Air Force and before the war was an instructor at the advanced flight training school. He was stationed as an instructor in Dęblin when the German invasion of Poland commenced, and volunteered for combat flying. After the USSR's invasion of Poland he fled to Romania and then to France, where he trained on the Morane-Saulnier M.S.406.

=== Battle of France ===
During the German invasion of France Henneberg was put in command of a MB.152 fighter group. He was stationed at Châteauroux, which was abandoned by its French personnel on 17 June 1940, upon which Henneberg was evacuated to England, reaching it via Bordeaux with three other pilots. This was the only Polish evacuation from France to England by plane.

=== Battle of Britain ===
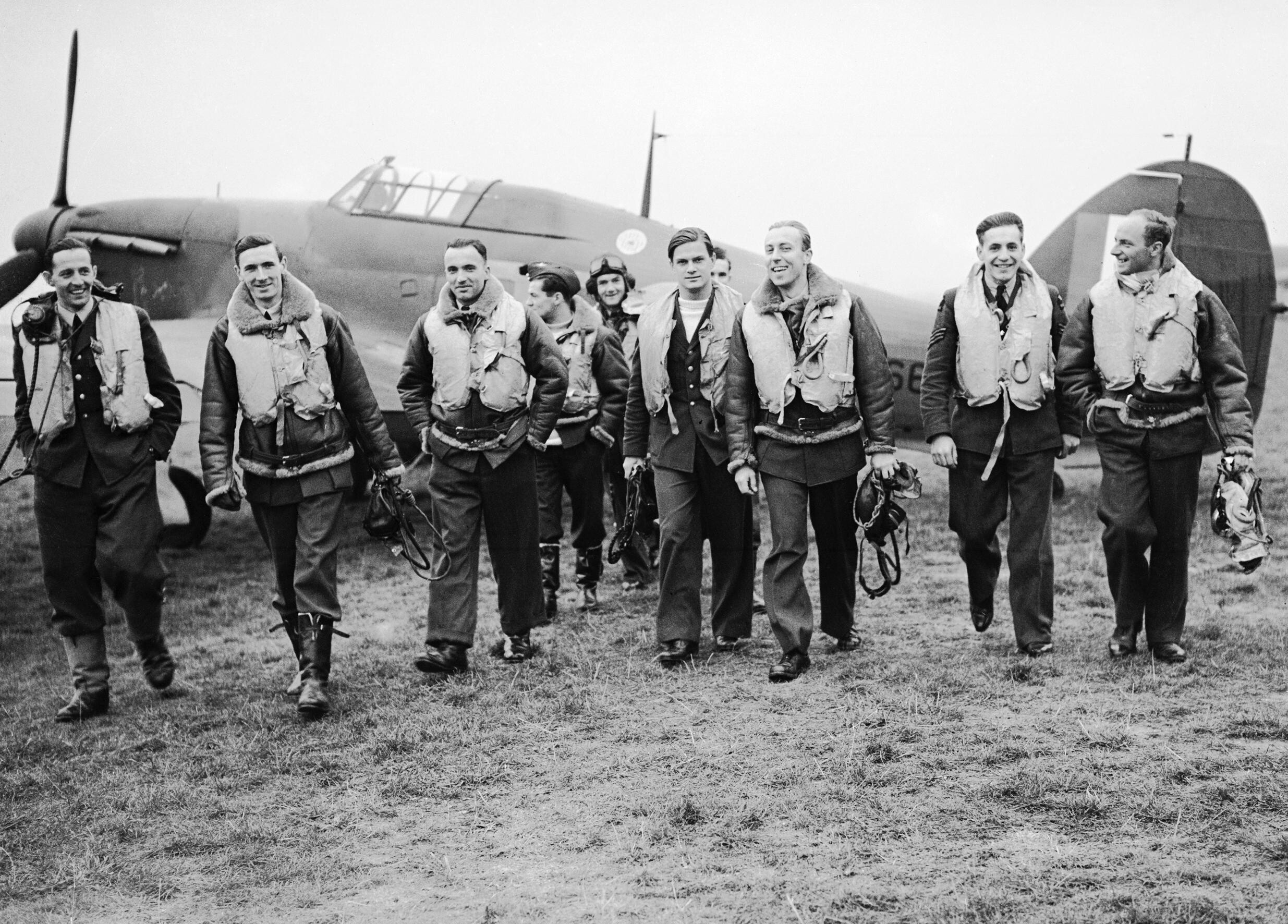
Zdzisław Henneberg third from the right

On 2 August 1940 Henneberg joined No. 303 Squadron RAF, under the command of Squadron Leader Kellett. He was shot down on 31 August during his first operational mission. On 2 September 1940 Henneberg was credited with one damaged enemy aircraft. Five days later in a battle over Essex Henneberg claimed one confirmed and one probable Bf 109. On 15 September 1940 (later known as Battle of Britain Day), Henneberg was attacked by a number of Bf 109s. He defended himself and destroyed one Do 17.

Henneberg temporarily took command of No. 303 Squadron RAF from Witold Urbanowicz on 21 September 1940. On 27 September he was credited with a Bf 109 and on 5 October he shot down a Bf 110 from the Erprobungsgruppe 210.

In a ceremony on 15 December he was awarded a DFC for 8 victories in the Battle of Britain by the Air Officer Commanding Fighter Command Air Chief Marshal Sholto Douglas.

=== Later war & death ===
Henneberg temporarily relinquished command of No. 303 Squadron RAF on 7 November 1940 to Adam Kowalczyk, before taking over permanently on 20 February 1941.

On 12 April 1941 Henneberg led six Supermarine Spitfires in an attack on airfields near Le Touquet and Crecy. During the attack Henneberg's plane was damaged by anti-aircraft fire. He managed to fly his plane out of occupied France, but had to ditch it in the English Channel 20 miles from Dungeness. Zbigniew Kustrzyński reported seeing Henneberg in the water and reported his position, but a two-day search could not find him and his body was never found.

He is remembered on the Battle of Britain Monument in London, the Memorial to the Polish Aviators Fallen Between 1939 and 1945 in Warsaw and the Polish War Memorial near RAF Northolt.

== In popular culture ==
Zdzisław Henneberg was portrayed by Christopher Jaciow in the 2018 film Hurricane: 303 Squadron.

== See also ==
- List of people who disappeared mysteriously at sea
