= Witold Łokuciewski =

Polish fighter ace

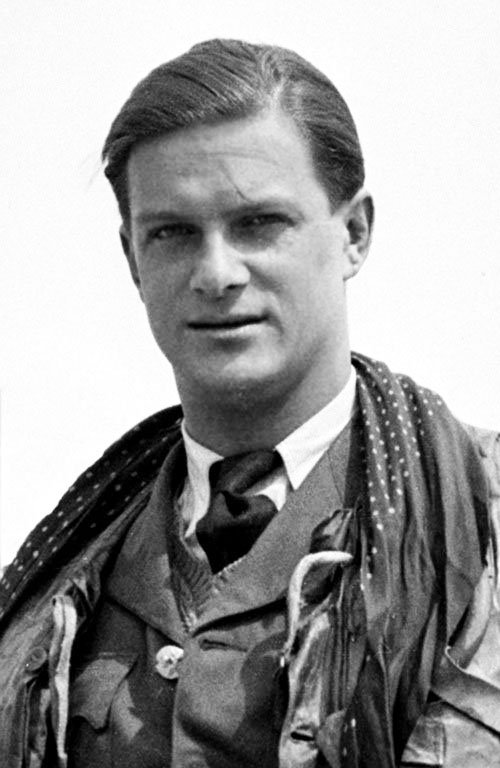
- Witold Łokuciewski
- Born: 2 February 1917; Novocherkassk, Russian Empire
- Died: 17 April 1990 (aged 73); Warsaw, Poland
- Burial place: Powązki Military Cemetery
- Military career
- Allegiance: Poland
- Branch: Polish Air Force; French Air Force; Royal Air Force; Polish People's Army
- Service years: 1935–1947 and 1956–1974
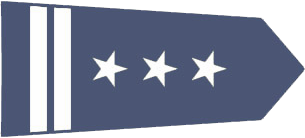
- Rank: colonel pilot
- Nickname: Tolo
- Service number: P1492
- Units: Polish 112th Fighter Escadrille; No. 303 Squadron RAF
- Commands: Commander No. 303 Squadron RAF (20 November 1941 – 13 March 1942); Commander No. 303 Squadron RAF (1 February 1946 – December 1946)
- Conflicts: World War II : Invasion of Poland; Battle of France; Battle of Britain
- Awards
- Other work: Military attaché

Witold Łokuciewski (2 February 1917 – 17 April 1990) was a Polish fighter ace of the Polish Air Force in World War II who was given the nickname Tolo.

== Early life and time in the Polish Air Force ==
Witold Łokuciewski

He was born to Antoni Łokuciewski in Novocherkassk in the Russian Empire. His family moved to Vilnius in 1918. He then graduated from high school Jan Śniadecki in Oszmiana and gained his high school diploma in 1935. He then began studying at the Polish Air Force University in Dęblin. After his graduation in 1938 he was assigned to the 112 Fighter Squadron of the 1st Air Regiment located in Warsaw, Poland. As a part of the unit he fought in the defense of Warsaw in 1939 using a PZL P.11 plane. After the invasion of Poland by the USSR he along with the 112 Fighter Squadron escaped into Romania.

== Time in the French Air Force ==
During the Battle of France Witold Łokuciewski fought in France starting from 17 May 1940 in a MS 406 fighter aircraft for the Polish air force established in France. He continued to fight for the French people until a radio call from the French Prime Minister, Philippe Pétain called for a ceasefire on 18 June when his Squadron ended flights. Later being evacuated to Great Britain on 21 June and being given the service number P1492.

== Time in the Royal Air Force ==
On 2 August 1940, he became a pilot in 303 Squadron a leading Polish squadron fighting for the Allies as part of the Royal Air Force. He began flying missions shortly after. On 20 November 1941, he was given command of the 303 Squadron. Łokuciewski saw considerable action through 1940–41. His pseudonym was "Tolo".

During a mission which took place over German occupied France on 13 March 1942, his plane became damaged and he was forced to make an emergency landing. After landing Witold was taken prisoner by the Germans and was sent to Stalag Luft III located near Sagan, now Żagań. During his time in the camp, he aided others in The Great Escape in 1944.

In May 1945 at the end of the war, he was liberated and taken back to England. He was reassigned to 303 Squadron on 29 November 1945. He became commanding officer of No. 303 Squadron in February 1946, until the unit disbanded in December. He was credited with 9 (and 1 shared) kills, and 4 probable kills which enabled him to get the "fighter ace" title. The title derives from World War I and was given in the French air force to pilots who shot down five enemy planes. During World War II, it got adopted by the American air force and unofficially - by the Polish air force in the West.

== Return to Poland and later life ==
When he returned to Poland in 1947 he was imprisoned by the Communist authorities, and on release worked as a taxi driver in Warsaw. He joined the Polish Air Force in 1956 after being accepted into military aviation, rising to a senior rank. In 1969–71 he was the Polish military attaché in London. He retired in 1974 and in 1985 was appointed to the Presidium in the Society of Fighters for Freedom and Democracy. Later he became a member in the Council for the Protection of Struggle and Martydom Sites from 1988 to 1990

On 11 November 1988 he became a member of the Honorary Committee of Commemoration during the 70th anniversary of National Independence Day of Poland. In 1989 he stood as a parliamentary candidate to the Sejm (lower house) in the first post-communist elections. And was given an entry in the honorary book of soldiers by Minister of National Defense, General Florian Siwicki. In 1989, nearly half a century after the war, when asked what does a fighter feel like while attacking an enemy, Witold replied: "if it's a rather large attack - firstly fear while going through a fire avalanche, then determination and lastly, if enemy gets shot and is coming down in a panache of smoke and fire - great massive satisfaction".

He died on 17 April 1990 and was buried at the Powązki Military Cemetery in Powązki, Warsaw.

== List of kills ==
Witold Łokuciewski was put on Bajan's list in the 20th position with 8 reliable plane kills and 4 probable kills. These are as follows:

=== Reliable plane kills ===
- He 111 on 10 June 1940 while piloting a MS-406
- Do 215 on 7 September 1940 while piloting a Hurricane Mk. I
- Bf 109 on 11 September 1940 while piloting a Hurricane Mk I
- Do 215 on 11 September 1940 while piloting a Hurricane Mk I
- Bf 109 on 15 September 1940 while piloting a Hurricane Mk I
- Bf 109 on 20 April 1941 while piloting a Spitfire Mk IIA
- Bf 109 on 18 June 1941 while piloting a Spitfire Mk IIA
- Bf 109 on 22 June 1941 while piloting a Spitfire Mk IIB

=== Possible plane kills ===
- Ju 87 on 6 September 1939 he heavily damaged the plane while piloting a P 11c
- Do 215 on 7 September 1940 while piloting a Hurricane Mk 1
- Bf 109 on 22 June 1941 while piloting a Spitfire Mk IIB
- Bf 109 on 11 July 1941 while piloting a Spitfire Mk IIB

== Awards ==
- Virtuti Militari, Silver Cross
- Cross of Valour (Poland), three times
- Polonia Restituta, Knight's Cross
- Polonia Restituta, Commander's Cross
- Distinguished Flying Cross (United Kingdom)
- Croix de Guerre (France)
