= Bajan's list =

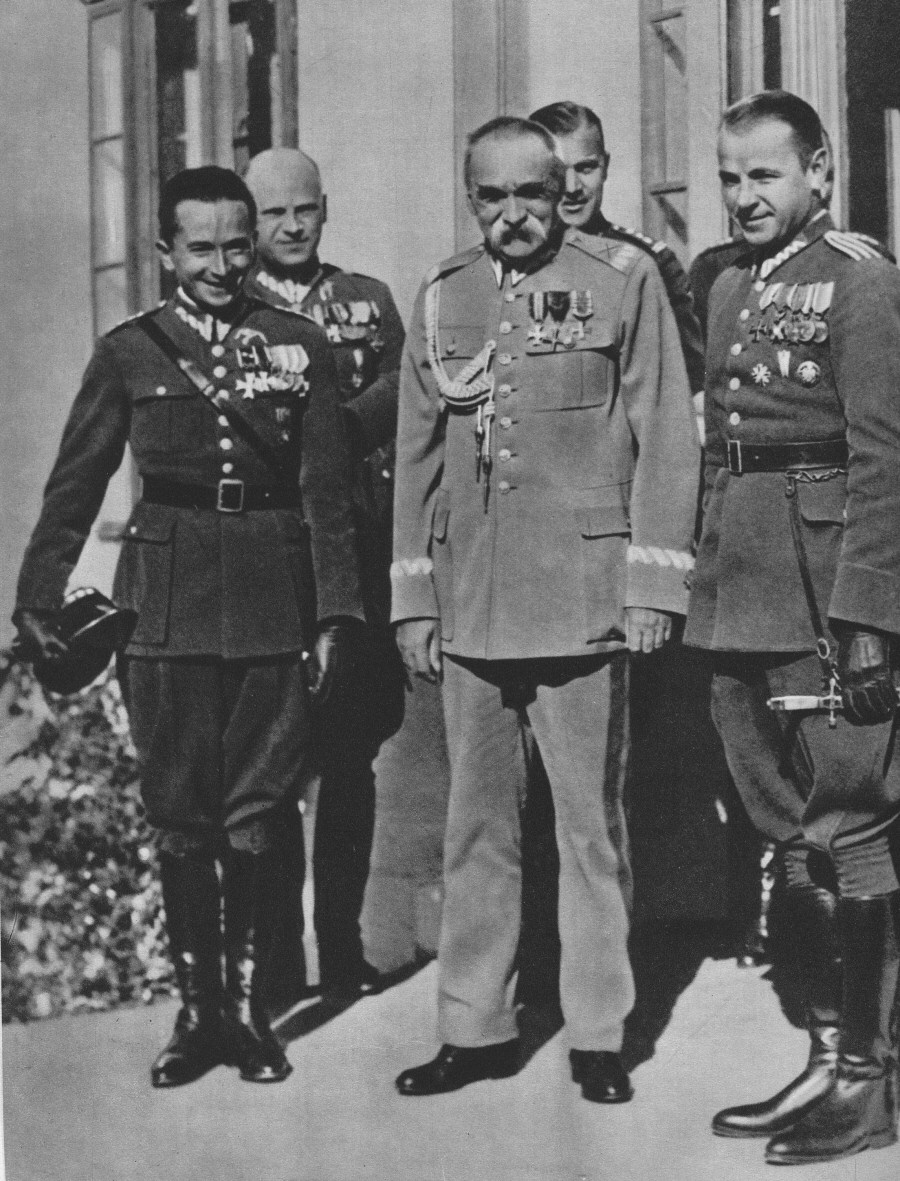
Bajan (left) with Marshal Józef Piłsudski (centre) and Gustaw Pokrzywka (right) after Challenge in 1934

Bajan list is a list of Polish fighter aces of World War II. It was released in 1946 and is named after the officer who supervised the project, colonel Jerzy Bajan.

== History ==
The list of Polish Air Force and Polish Air Forces in Great Britain fighter pilots air victories was compiled for the Polish Air Force Historical Commission by colonel Jerzy Bajan of the Fighter Claim Commission, and a liaison officer at the RAF Fighter Command headquarters. The publication, released in 1946, was titled Polish Fighter Pilots Achievements during the Second World War. Not all documents (particularly for the first years) could be recovered at that time, so some of the data was based on interviews; after reviewing earlier documents and statistics Bajan's methodology attempted to reduce the number of false reports.

== List ==
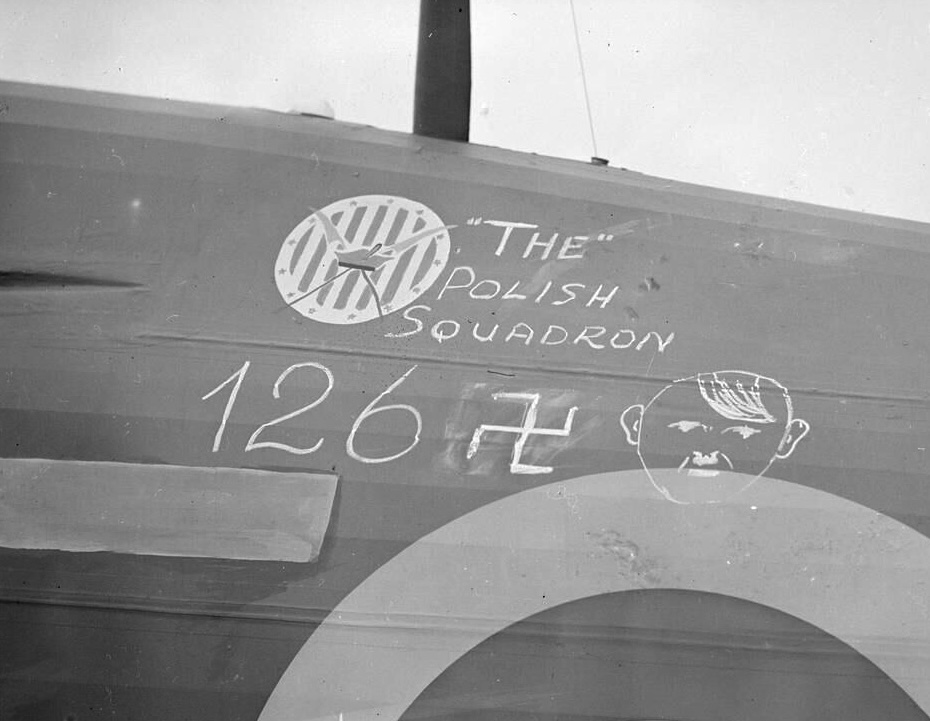
126 German aircraft or "Adolfs" were claimed as shot down by No. 303 Squadron pilots during the Battle of Britain. This is the score of "Adolfs" chalked onto a Hurricane.

According to the final list Polish pilots accounted for 105 aircraft destroyed during the Polish September Campaign (most of these occurred during the first six days of the war). The number of kills during the Battle of Britain is estimated at 2698, many of them by the No. 303 Fighter Squadron.

The list includes 447 entries, with one Czech pilot, Josef František (who joined Polish Air Force as a volunteer), and five entries for the rare cases where victories attributed to the units, rather than individuals. The leading Polish ace, according to the list, is general Stanisław Skalski, with almost 19 confirmed kills. 42 Polish pilots scored 5 or more victories during the war.

The top 50 pilots from the Bajan list are (revised following updated scores during the Battle of Britain):

Lp	Rank	Name	Confirmed kills	Probable kills	Damaged
1	gen	Stanisław Skalski	18 11/12	2	4 1/3
2	gen	Witold Urbanowicz	14	1	-
3	ppor	Josef František	8 1/2	1	-
4	kpt	Eugeniusz Horbaczewski	16 1/2	1	1
5	kpt	Bolesław Gładych	17	2	1/2
6	ppłk	Jan Zumbach	8 11/24	5	1
7	ppłk	Marian Pisarek	3 1/2	1	2
8	płk	Aleksander Gabszewicz	9 1/2	1 1/3	3
9	por	Michał Maciejowski	9 1/2	1	1
10	por	Mirosław Ferić	6 11/24	1	1
11	mjr	Henryk Szczęsny	9 1/3	1	2
12	chor	Aleksander Chudek	9	1	1
13	ppłk	Jan Falkowski	9	1	1
14	por	Stanisław Brzeski	8 1/2	2	1
15	ppłk	Wacław Król	8 1/2	1	1/3
16	mjr	Zdzisław Henneberg	3 1/2	1	1
17	mjr	Antoni Głowacki	8 1/3	3	4
18	por	Eugeniusz Szaposznikow	3	-	1
19	por	Adolf Pietrasiak	8 1/10	-	2/5
20	mjr	Witold Łokuciewski	5	3 1/2	-
21	chor	Henryk Pietrzak	7 1/2	1	1
22	mjr	Józef Jeka	7 1/2	-	3
23	mjr	Bolesław Drobiński	7	1 1/3	-
24	ppor	Marian Bełc	7	-	-
25	kpt	Witold Łanowski	6	-	-
26	mjr	Karol Pniak	6 3/4	2	2 5/6
27	mjr	Wacław Łapkowski	5 1/3	-	1
28	ppłk	Stefan Janus	6	-	1
29	por	Ludwik Witold Paszkiewicz	2 1/8	-	-
30	ppłk	Kazimierz Rutkowski	5 1/2	2	1
31	por	Czesław Główczyński	5 1/2	2	1
32	por	Michał Cwynar	5 1/2	1	-
33	płk	Stefan Witorzeńć	5 1/2	-	2
34	ppłk	Mieczysław Mümler	5 1/2	-	1 1/2
35	ppor	Bolesław Własnowolski	5 1/2	-	-
36	por	Mieczysław Adamek	5 9/20	1	-
37	por	Franciszek Surma	5	3 1/3	1
38	kpt	Stanisław Blok	5	1	3
39	por	Kazimierz Sporny	5	1	1
40	por	Grzegorz Sołogub	5	1	-
41	st.sierż	Jakub Bargiełowski	5	-	3
42	mjr	Jerzy Popławski	5	-	2
43	por.	Jan Kremski	4 14/15	1/3	1/15
44		Eugeniusz Nowakiewicz	4 5/6	1	1
45		Władysław Potocki	4 3/4		1
46		Tadeusz Nowak (pilot)	4 1/2	1	1
47	por.	Kazimierz Wünsche	4 1/2	1	-
48		Mirosław Ignacy Wojciechowski	3 5/8		
49		Jan Kowalski	1/8	4	3
50		Tadeusz Koc	4 1/3	3	-

== See also ==
- List of World War II aces from Poland
