= List of World War II aces from Poland =

This is a list of fighter aces in World War II from Poland.

== A ==
| Name | Kills | Awards | Notes |
|---|---|---|---|
| Adamek, Mieczyslaw | 8 | | KIA 18 May 1944 |
| Akenamdy, Prince Stefan | | | |
| Arct, Bogdan Stanislaw | 5 | | |

== B ==
| Name | Kills | Awards | Notes |
|---|---|---|---|
| Bargielowski, Jakub | 6 + 2 V-1s | | |
| Bartlomiejczyk, Czeslaw | 1 + 6 V-1s | | |
| Belc, Marian | 6 1/8 | DFC | KIFA 27 August 1942 |
| Beyer, Andrzej | 8 | | |
| Blok, Stanislaw | 6 | | |
| Brzeski, Stanislaw | 13 1/2 | DSO, DFC** | |

== C ==
| Name | Kills | Awards | Notes |
|---|---|---|---|
| Chalupa, Stanislaw Jozef | 7 | | |
| Cholajda, Antoni "Ghandi" | 8 | | |
| Chudek, Aleksandr | 9 | | KIA 23 June 1944 |
| Cwynar, Michal | 13 | | |
| Czerwubski, Tadeusz | 7 | | |

== D ==
| Name | Kills | Awards | Notes |
|---|---|---|---|
| Drobinski, Boleslaw H "Ski" | 7 | | |
| Dudwal, Hieronim | 6 | | KIA in France 7 June 1940 |

== F ==
| Name | Kills | Awards | Notes |
|---|---|---|---|
| Falkowski, Jan Pavel | 9 | DFC | |
| Ferić, Mirosław "Ox" | 6 11/24 | VM, KW**, DFC | KIFA 14 February 1942 |
| Feruga, Jozef | 5 | | |

== G ==
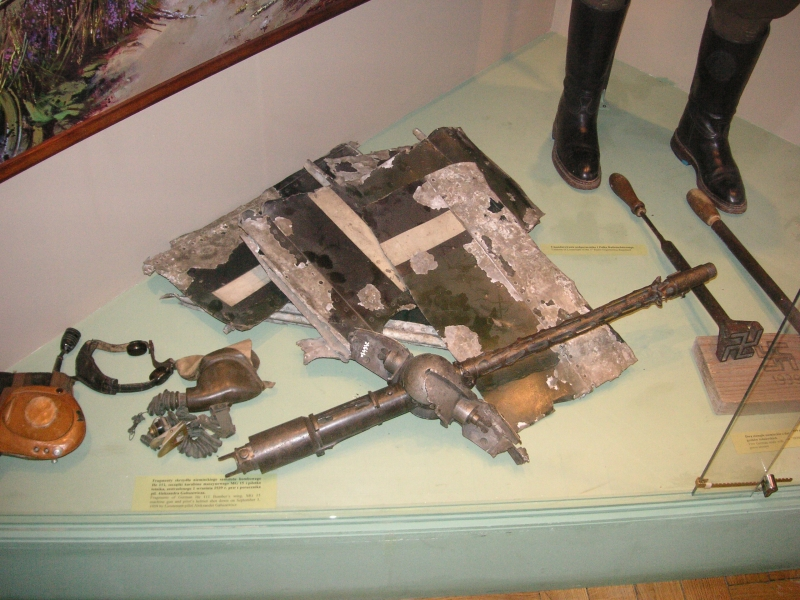
German MG 15 aerial machine gun, pilot's cap and some debris of a German Heinkel He 111 downed by Aleksander Gabszewicz on September 1, 1939

| Name | Kills | Awards | Notes |
|---|---|---|---|
| Gabreski, Francis Stanley "Gabby" | 28 | DSC, DSM, LM, DFC, AM | (Polish-American) |
| Gabszewicz,Aleksander Klemens | 11 | DFC, DSO*, CdG, VM* | |
| Gładych, Bolesław Michal "Mike" | 17 | VM***, DFC, AM***, CdG | incorrectly listed as 14 kills in Lista Bajana |
| Głowacki, Antoni | 10+1/3 | DFC, DFM, VM, KW*** | Głowacki, New Zealander Brian Carbury and Ronald Hamlyn and Archie McKellar, both British pilots, were the only four "aces in a day", (Note: The term "ace in a day" is used to designate a pilot who has shot down five or more airplanes in a single day, based on usual definition of a "flying ace") in the Battle of Britain. |
| Glowczynski, Czeslaw | 6 | | |
| Gnyś, Władysław | | CdG, DFC, KW*, VM | |

== H ==
| Name | Kills | Awards | Notes |
|---|---|---|---|
| Horbaczewski, Eugeniusz 'Dziubek' | 16.5+4V-1 | VM*, KW***, DSO, DFC* | KIA 18 August 1944 |

Herbst, Witold Aleksander

== I ==
| Name | Kills | Awards | Notes |
|---|---|---|---|
| Idrain, Ryszard | 6 | | |

== J ==
| Name | Kills | Awards | Notes |
|---|---|---|---|
| Jankowski, Tadeusz | 13 | | KIA 20 September 1944 |
| Janus, Stefan | 6 | | |
| Jastrzebski, Franciszek | 6 | | KIA 25 October 1940 |
| Jeka, Jozef | 8 | | KIA 13 April 1958 |

== K ==
| Name | Kills | Awards | Notes |
|---|---|---|---|
| Kalinowski, Victor | 12 | | |
| Karnkowski, Stefan | 7 | | |
| Klawe, Wlodzimierz | 7 | | |
| Kosinski, Kazimierz Bronislaw | 5 | | KIA 26 January 1942 |
| Kotz, Tadeusz | 6 | VM, DFC | |
| Kremski, Jan Bernard | 9 | | |
| Krol, Waclaw Szczepan | 9 | | |
| Kustrzynski, Zbigniew "Zbyshek" | 18 | VM***, DFC | Shot down over France, POW 6.4.42. Escaped Stalag Luft 3 SAGAN with Robert Stanford Tuck in December 1944. Reached England February 1945. |

== L ==
| Name | Kills | Awards | Notes |
|---|---|---|---|
| Lanowski, Witold Aleksander | 6 | KW & bar, DFC, AM & 10 bars | plus 1.6 AIR unclaimed (in USAAF records) & 4.6 GROUND unclaimed (in USAAF records). Unknown number of Bf 109’s destroyed on the ground recorded in 317 squadron records. incorrectly listed as 2 kills in Lista Bajana |
| Lapkowski, Waclaw | 5 1/3 | | KIA 2 July 1941 |
| Lokuciewski, Witold "Tolo" | 5 | VM, KW***, PR, DFC, CdG | |

== M ==
| Name | Kills | Awards | Notes |
|---|---|---|---|
| Maciejowski, Michal Miroslaw | 11 | | POW 1943 |
| Majewski, Longin | 7 | | |
| Mielnecki, Jerzy Andrzej | 7 | | all V-1s |
| Mumler, Mieczyslaw | 9 | | |
| Murkowski, Antoni | 7 | DFC | including 4 x V-1s |

== N ==
| Name | Kills | Awards | Notes |
|---|---|---|---|
| Nowak, Tadeusz | 5 | | KIA 21 September 1941 |
| Nowakiewicz, Eugenieusz Jan Adam | 6 | | |
| Tadeusz Nowierski | 5 | | |
| Nowoczyn, Witold | 6 | | |

== P ==
| Name | Kills | Awards | Notes |
|---|---|---|---|
| Pietrasiak, Adolf | 11 | VM, Cross of Valour, DFM | 29/11/1943 |
| Pietrzak, Aleksander | 9 | | 02/08/1945 |
| Pietrzak, Henryk J | 14 | DFC, KW***, VM | |
| Piotrowski, Maciej | 6 | | |
| Pniak, Karol | 8 | | |
| Pomietlarz, Jan | 5 | VM, KW** | 12/16/2012 |
| Popek, Mieczyslaw | 5 | | 15/01/1944 |
| Poplawski, Jerzy | 5 | VM (Silver), KW**, DFC | 21/6/2004 |
| Potocki, Wladyslaw Jan | 6 | | 23/2/1996 |

== R ==
| Name | Kills | Awards | Notes |
|---|---|---|---|
| Rogowski, Jan Aleksander | 1 | | |
| Rudowski, Stanislaw | 12 | | |
| Rutkowski, Kazimierz | 6 | DFC, VM, KW | |

== S ==
| Name | Kills | Awards | Notes |
|---|---|---|---|
| Schmidt, Jerzy | 6 | | KIA 6 December 1944 |
| Siekierski, Jan | 11 | | |
| Siwek, Kazimierz | 11 | | |
| Stanisław Skalski | 21 | DSO, DFC**, VM*, KW*** | |
| Smigielski, Jan | 5 | | |
| Sologub, Grzegorz "George" | 5 | DFC, VM, KW** | 306 Squadron |
| Sporny, Kazimierz | 5 | DFC, VM, KW** | 15/5/1949 |
| Surma, Franciszek | 5 | | KIA 8 November 1941 |
| Szczesny, Henryk "Sneezy" | 11 | | |
| Sztramko, Kazimierz | 7 | | |
| Szymankiewicz, Teofil | 7 | | |
| Szymanski, Tadeusz | 10 | | |

== T ==
| Name | Kills | Awards | Notes |
|---|---|---|---|
| Tronczynski, Stefan | 6 | | |

== U ==
| Name | Kills | Awards | Notes |
|---|---|---|---|
| Urbanowicz, Witold Aleksander | 14 | VM, DFC | |

== W ==
| Name | Kills | Awards | Notes |
|---|---|---|---|
| Wczelik, Antoni | 5 | | KIA 14 April 1942 |
| Wesolowski, Marian | 6 | | |
| Witorzenc, Stefan | 6 | | |
| Wiza, Franciszek | 6 | DFC | 12/12/1956 |
| Wlasnowolski, Boleslaw Andrzej | 6 | | KIA 1 November 1940 |
| Wunsche, Kazimierz | 6 | DFC, VM (Silver), KW** | |

== Z ==
| Name | Kills | Awards | Notes |
|---|---|---|---|
| Zalebski, Jozef | 10 | | |
| Zumbach, Jan Eugeniusz Ludwig | 8 11/24 | DFC, VM, KW*** | 3/1/1986 |
| Żurakowski, Janusz | 6 | DFC, VM, KW** | |

== Key to Awards Abbreviations ==
| Abbreviation | Award |
|---|---|
| AFC | Air Force Cross |
| AM | Air Medal |
| CdG | Croix de Guerre |
| DFC | Distinguished Flying Cross |
| DFM | Distinguished Flying Medal |
| DSC | Distinguished Service Cross |
| DSM | Distinguished Service Medal |
| DSO | Distinguished Service Order |
| KW | Krzyż Walecznych (Polish Cross of Valor) |
| LM | Legion of Merit |
| PR | Polonia Restituta (Order of Poland Reborn) |
| VM | Virtuti Militari (Polish Medal: "To Military Valour") |

== See also ==
- Bajan's list
