= Henryk Szczęsny =

Polish fighter ace

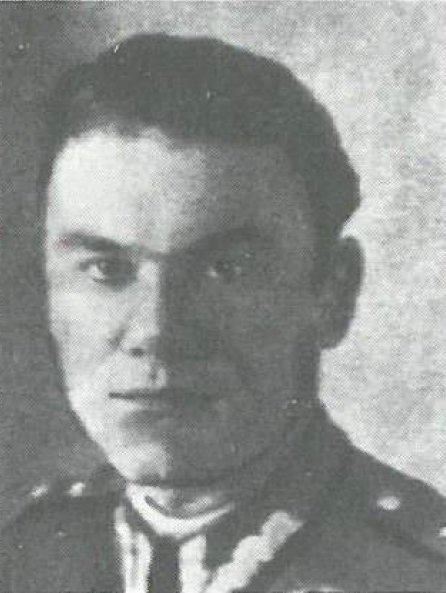
- Born: 27 March 1909; Ruszkowo, Russian Empire (present-day Poland)
- Died: 25 July 1996 (aged 87); London
- Military career
- Allegiance: Poland; United Kingdom
- Branch: Polish Air Force; Royal Air Force
- Service years: 1933–1965
- Rank: kapitan
- Service number: 76781
- Units: No. 302 Polish Fighter Squadron; No. 317 Polish Fighter Squadron
- Commands: No. 317 Polish Fighter Squadron
- Conflicts: Polish Defensive War, World War II
- Awards: Virtuti Militari; Cross of Valour; Distinguished Flying Medal (UK)

Henryk Szczęsny (27 March 1909 – 25 July 1996) was a Polish fighter ace of the Polish Air Force in World War II with 9 confirmed kills and one shared.

== Biography ==
Szczęsny was born in Ruszkowo near Ciechanów in Poland. He was the son of Stanisław and Marianna. In January 1931 he entered to Polish Air Force Academy in Dęblin. He was promoted first lieutenant (podporucznik) on 15 August 1933. During the Invasion of Poland he flew old PZL P.7. On 3 September 1939 he was credited with a "probable" victory over a Ju 87. On 14 September, flying a PZL P.11 he shot down a He 111. He injured his leg in the next day.

On 17 September, he crossed the border with Romania, in Bucharest he healed his wound. On 12 November 1939 he arrived in Marseille. He came to England in February 1940. On 6 August he was assigned to a fighter squadron. One week later he shot down a Do 17. On 19 December he was posted to No. 317 Polish Fighter Squadron. Between 20 August 1941 and 28 February 1942 he was made Commanding Officer of his squadron.

On 4 April 1943 his plane was damaged in combat with two enemy planes, he had to parachute and was captured by the Germans. He was sent to Stalag Luft III. After his release from internment in 1945 he returned to England. He served in the RAF until 1965.

Henryk Szczęsny died on 25 July 1996 in London. He was buried at the Gunnersbury Cemetery.

His son, Bradley Curtis (born Zdzisław Szczęsny; July 9, 1938 – August 19, 1980), was the flight engineer of Saudia Flight 163 that claimed the lives of 301 people, including Curtis.

== Aerial victory credits ==
- Ju 87 – 3 September 1939 probably destroyed and 1 damaged
- He 111 – 14 September 1939
- He 111 – 15 September 1939
- Do 17 – 13 August 1940
- Bf 110 – 11 September 1940
- ^{1}/_{3} x Do 215 – 5 October 1940
- Bf 109 – 1 December 1940
- Bf 109 - 2 December 1940 damaged
- Bf 109 – 5 December 1940
- ^{1}/_{2} x Bf 109 – 10 July 1941
- ^{1}/_{2} x Ju 88 – 14 July 1941
- 2 x Fw 190 – 4 April 1943

== Awards ==
Virtuti Militari, Silver Cross
Cross of Valour (Poland), four times
Distinguished Flying Medal
