= Grzegorz Sołogub =

Polish military aviator

Grzegorz Sołogub DFC
- Born: 10 May 1918; Mołodeczno
- Died: 25 November 1986 (aged 68); Cinderford
- Military career
- Allegiance: Poland; United Kingdom
- Branch: Polish Air Force; Royal Air Force
- Rank: Flight Lieutenant
- Service number: P-1624
- Units: No. 317 Polish Fighter Squadron; No. 306 Polish Fighter Squadron; No. 302 Polish Fighter Squadron
- Conflicts: Polish Defensive War, World War II
- Awards: Virtuti Militari; Cross of Valour; Distinguished Flying Cross (UK)

Grzegorz Sołogub DFC (1918-1986) was a Polish fighter ace of the Polish Air Force in World War II with 5 confirmed kills.

== Biography ==
Sołogub was born in Mołodeczno in the family of a former Imperial Russian army officer. In 1938 he entered the Polish Air Force Academy in Dęblin. After the September Campaign he was evacuated to the UK via Romania and France. After training he joined No. 317 Polish Fighter Squadron in April 1941. On 26 May he was transferred to No. 306 Polish Fighter Squadron. Sołogub scored his first victory on 27 September and was commissioned four days later. Having completed a combat tour, from 21 April 1943 he served as instructor at No. 58 OTU and then from October at No. 61 OTU. On 20 October he returned to No. 306 Squadron. From 9 July 1944 to 20 December 1944 he flew in No. 302 Polish Fighter Squadron then he came back to No. 306, where on 5 January 1945 he took command of B Flight.

After demobilisation he acquired a farm at Mitcheldean and became a farmer.

Grzegorz Sołogub died on 25 November 1986.

== Aerial victory credits ==
- Bf 109 – 27 September 1941
- Bf 109 – 30 December 1941 (probably destroyed)
- 2 Bf 109 – 16 April 1942
- Bf 109 – 7 June 1944
- Fw 190 – 23 June 1944

== Awards ==
Virtuti Militari, Silver Cross
Cross of Valour (Poland), four times
Distinguished Flying Cross (United Kingdom)
