= Stanisław Brzeski =

Polish World War II flying ace

Stanisław Brzeski DSO DFC**
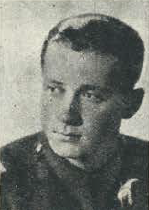
- Stanisław Brzeski
- Born: 21 April 1918; Lipnik, Austria-Hungary
- Died: 3 December 1972 (aged 54); Norwich, England
- Military career
- Allegiance: Poland; United Kingdom
- Branch: Polish Air Force; Royal Air Force
- Service years: 1932-
- Rank: Squadron Leader
- Service number: P-1902 (RAF)
- Units: No. 307 Polish Fighter Squadron; No. 303 Polish Fighter Squadron; No. 317 Polish Fighter Squadron; No. 302 Polish Fighter Squadron
- Conflicts: Polish Defensive War, World War II
- Awards: Virtuti Militari; Polonia Restituta; Cross of Valour; Distinguished Flying Cross (UK) with two bars; Distinguished Service Order

Stanisław Brzeski (21 April 1918 – 3 December 1972) DFC** was a Polish fighter ace of the Polish Air Force in World War II with 8 confirmed kills and one shared.

== Biography ==
Stanisław Brzeski was born in Lipnik near Staszów in 1918. In 1932 he entered the Non-Commissioned Officer's School for minors in Nisko. Then he served in the 77th Infantry Regiment. In 1936 he was transferred to the Polish Air Force. Initially he became a glider pilot, then he was trained as a fighter pilot.

At the outbreak of World War II, Brzeski served in the Modlin Army. On 3 September 1939 he destroyed a German Observation balloon. The next day he escorted bombers PZL.23 Karaś, his plane was hit and damaged by flak, Brzeski was forced to land, but the same day he came back to his unit. On 9 September he damaged a plane near Lublin. On the night of 18/19 September, he crossed the border with Romania, then on 19 November he came to France via Yugoslavia. He was assigned to a new unit only on 18 May 1940. Due to the difficult situation in France Brzeski was evacuated to the UK.

Initially he was assigned to No. 307 Polish Night Fighter Squadron, but on 14 October he was transferred to No. 303 Polish Fighter Squadron where he began training on Hurricane. On 10 February 1941 he downed a Messerschmitt Bf 109 over Dunkirk. On 25 February he was moved to No. 317 Polish Fighter Squadron. Since 23 April 1943 he served in No. 302 Polish Fighter Squadron and on 28 December he came back to No. 303 squadron.

On 21 May 1944, he was hit by flak over Abbeville, Brzeski slightly wounded, managed to land. After four hours he was captured by Germans and sent to Stalag Luft III. In January 1945 he was deported to the West. After the liberation, he returned to England and served in RAF as instructor and flight controller.

Stanisław Brzeski died on 3 December 1972 in Norwich and was buried in the cemetery of Dereham.

== Aerial victory credits ==
- He 111 - 9 September 1939 and one probably destroyed
- Bf 109E - 10 February 1941
- Bf 109 - 18 February 1941
- 1/2 Bf 109 - 10 July 1941
- 1/2 Ju 88 - 14 July 1941
- Bf 109F - 8 November 1941 and one damaged
- Ju 88 - 6 December 1941
- Fw 190 - 25 April 1942
- Fw 190 - 26 July 1943 probably destroyed
- He 111 - 19 August 1942
- Fw 190 - 2 May 1943
- Fw 190 - 24 June 1943
- 1/2 Fw 190 - 4 September 1943
- Fw- 190 - 23 September 1943 probably destroyed

== Awards ==
Virtuti Militari, Silver Cross
Cross of Valour (Poland), four times
Distinguished Flying Cross (United Kingdom), with two bars,
Distinguished Service Order (United Kingdom)
