= Jerzy Popławski =

Polish fighter ace

Jerzy Popławski DFC
- Born: 1 October 1919; Model
- Died: 21 June 2004 (aged 84); Buenos Aires
- Military career
- Allegiance: Poland; United Kingdom
- Branch: Polish Air Force; Royal Air Force
- Rank: Squadron Leader
- Service number: 76751
- Units: No. 302 Polish Fighter Squadron; No. 111 Squadron RAF; No. 229 Squadron RAF; No. 308 Polish Fighter Squadron; No. 315 Polish Fighter Squadron
- Commands: No. 308 Polish Fighter Squadron; No. 315 Polish Fighter Squadron
- Conflicts: Polish Defensive War, World War II
- Awards: Virtuti Militari; Cross of Valour; Distinguished Flying Cross (UK)

Jerzy Popławski (1 October 1919 – 21 June 2004) DFC was a Polish fighter ace of the Polish Air Force in exile during World War II with 5 confirmed kills.

== Biography ==
Jerzy Popławski was born in 1919. In 1938 he entered the Polish Air Force Academy in Dęblin and was commissioned on 1 September 1939. After the Soviet Invasion of Poland he was evacuated to Romania, and on 29 October 1939 arrived in Marseille via Beirut. He went to Britain in one of the first groups of Polish airmen, on 27 January 1940. He received service no. 76751. After training Popławski was posted to the No. 302 Polish Fighter Squadron on 30 July. He was transferred to the No. 111 Squadron RAF on 10 September and on 26 to the No. 229 Squadron RAF. In November 1940 he returned to No. 302 Squadron. On 6 November he was injured in an accident landing a Hurricane. On 16 March 1941 he was assigned to the No. 308 Polish Fighter Squadron. Popławski scored his first victory on 4 September 1941 shooting down a Bf 109. On 30 April he took command of his squadron. On 1 September he was sent as instructor to No. 58 Operational Training Unit. On 17 April 1943 he was given command of the No. 315 Polish Fighter Squadron.

After the war ended Popławski emigrated to Argentina. He died in Buenos Aires.

== Aerial victory credits ==
- Bf 109 – 4 September 1941
- Bf 109 – 16 September 1941
- Bf 109 – 21 September 1941
- Bf 109 – 27 September 1941
- Bf 109 – 13 October 1941
- Bf 109 – 8 November 1941 (damaged)
- Fw 190 – 20 April 1943 (damaged)

== Awards ==
Virtuti Militari, Silver Cross
Cross of Valour (Poland), three times
Distinguished Flying Cross (United Kingdom)
