= Antoni Głowacki =

Polish WWII fighter ace

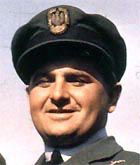
- Antoni Głowacki c. 1945
- Born: Antoni Głowacki; 10 February 1910; Warsaw, Poland
- Died: 27 April 1980 (aged 70); Wellington, New Zealand
- Military career
- Allegiance: Poland; United Kingdom; New Zealand
- Branch: Polish Air Force; Royal Air Force; Royal New Zealand Air Force
- Service years: 1935–1945 1946–1960
- Rank: Wing Commander
- Nickname: Antek (Polish nickname) Toni (RAF nickname)
- Service number: P-1527
- Units: No. 501 Squadron RAF No. 303 Polish Fighter Squadron; No. 308 "City of Kraków" Polish Fighter Squadron No. 307 "City of Lwów" Polish Night Fighter Squadron
- Commands: No. 309 "Land of Czerwień" Polish Fighter-Reconnaissance Squadron; No. 302 Polish Fighter Squadron
- Conflicts: Second World War: Battle of Poland; Battle of Britain; European Theatre
- Awards: Distinguished Flying Cross; Distinguished Flying Medal; Virtuti Militari; Cross of Valor & Three Bars
- Other work: New Zealand Department of Civil Aviation Airfield Inspector

Wing Commander Antoni (Toni) Głowacki (10 February 1910 – 27 April 1980) DFC, DFM, was a Polish Second World War fighter pilot flying with Polish Squadrons attached to the Royal Air Force, who is notable for shooting down five German aircraft on 24 August 1940 during the Battle of Britain, becoming one of only four pilots who gained "ace-in-a-day" status during that battle, the others being New Zealander Brian Carbury, Englishman Ronald Hamlyn and Scot Archie McKellar.

== Early years ==
Głowacki was born on 10 February 1910 in Warsaw, attending a local primary school and graduating from the Radio Engineering School. He attended the Wawelberg and Rotwand Advanced Constructing and Electronics School, a technical school and between 1928 and 1930 he was the head of the laboratory in the Philips plants in Poland.

After enrolling in basic military training, Głowacki entered air training at Lublinek airfield near Lodz. After 1935, he became an officer serving in 1 Air Wing in Warsaw. In 1938, Głowacki completed a specialist course at the Air Force Training Centre No.1 in Dęblin, and was retained there as a flying instructor, as the Polish Air Force was in great need of new recruits. He joined other instructors such as Jan Zumbach and Janusz Żurakowski.

== Second World War ==
During "Black September", (September 1939), the Dęblin unit was unable to mount a defence and Głowacki joined a reconnaissance platoon of the Warsaw Armoured-Motorised Brigade, commanded by Flight Lieutenant Julian Lagowski. At the collapse of the Polish resistance in late September, Głowacki fled to Romania where along with thousands of other Polish soldiers and airmen, he was interned. He made his way to France via the sea, as the Battle of France was imminent, and was ordered to join the first 100 pilots selected to train as a bomber pilot in England. On arrival in England on 28 January 1940, they were transferred by the RAF to fighter squadrons which were rapidly being deployed in anticipation of an attack on Britain in 1940.

After initial training at No. 6 OTU in Sutton Bridge, Głowacki was posted to No. 501 RAF "County of Gloucester" Fighter Squadron on 5 August 1940 as a sergeant pilot flying Hawker Hurricanes.

=== Battle of Britain ===
Głowacki was immediately involved in uneventful daily sorties for 10 days (building up his total flying time on Hurricanes to 50 hours), until 15 July when the squadron intercepted Junkers Ju 87 dive-bombers. His first combat sorties in Hurricane I, SD-A (VZ124) resulted in a Ju 87 and later in the same day, a Dornier Do 215 destroyed. His squadron was deployed four times throughout the day, intercepting raiders over Dover.

Unlike other RAF pilots, Głowacki preferred to fly one aircraft exclusively, SD-A (V7234), which he considered his "lucky Hurricane." During three sorties on 24 August 1940, flying SD-A, Głowacki shot down three Bf 109s and two Junkers Ju 88 bombers over Ramsgate, to become the first "One-day Ace" of the Battle of Britain.

On 28 August 1940 Głowacki shot down another Bf 109 when flying SD-O (P5193). On 31 August 1940, during an attack on group of Dornier Do 17 bombers, he claimed a bomber that dived out of the formation (although the claim was later reverted to a probable), but he was shot down over Gravesend and was injured when his Hurricane SD-P (P3208) crashed and was burnt out. After returning from hospital, he was again rotated into regular duty but had a difficult time regaining his scoring touch. Głowacki was promoted to Pilot Officer and on 10 February 1941 was posted to No. 55 OTU at Aston Down, where he was a flying instructor specialising in combat tactics.

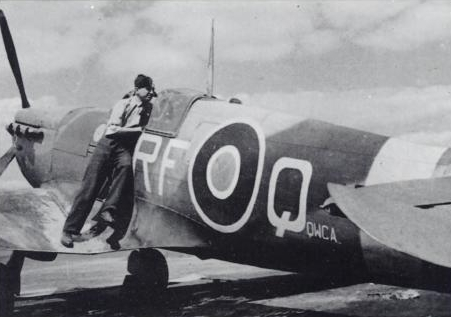
Głowacki's Spitfire, August 1942

=== European Theatre ===
On 7 November 1941, along with other Poles who had been attached to RAF squadrons, Głowacki was transferred to No. 303 Polish Fighter Squadron where he eventually flew Supermarine Spitfires. On 27 April and 19 August 1942, Głowacki had two probables over Dieppe, claiming Focke-Wulf Fw 190s. He also shared in the downing of a Heinkel He 111.

On 7 February 1943 Squadron Leader Głowacki was transferred to No. 308 "City of Kraków" Polish Fighter Squadron (Krakowski), serving as flight commander until 22 February 1944. After an exchange posting with the USAAF in May 1944, he was posted to No. 61 OTU. From 9 September 1944 till 16 July 1945, Głowacki was the commanding officer at No. 309 "Land of Czerwień" Polish Fighter-Reconnaissance Squadron (Ziemi Czerwieńskiej). The squadron was equipped with long-ranging North American Mustang Mk III fighters. From 23 July 1945 he served in No. 60 OTU and between October and November 1945 he served in No. 307 "City of Lwów" Polish Night Fighter Squadron (Lwowskich Puchaczy).

== Postwar ==
From 1 December 1945 Głowacki was a liaison officer to 13 RAF Fighter Group. At the end of 1946, Głowacki was the commanding officer of No. 302 "City of Poznań" Polish Fighter Squadron (Poznański). His last rank in the Royal Air Force was Squadron Leader. Głowacki's wartime victories involved a number of disputes but he is credited with eight victories, one shared, three probable and three damaged. After the war, he completed his memoirs which detailed his combat missions.

After demobilisation, Głowacki emigrated to New Zealand where he joined the Royal New Zealand Air Force. As a Flight Lieutenant he was an instructor at OTU at Ohakea Air Base, converting new pilots from piston-engined trainers to Vampire jets. He retired from the RNZAF in 1960 and became an airfield inspector with the New Zealand Department of Civil Aviation where he was responsible for sport and executive aviation. Głowacki died on 27 April 1980 in Wellington, New Zealand.

== Honours and tributes ==
In recognition of his service in the Battle of Britain and later campaigns, Głowacki received several awards:

Distinguished Flying Medal
Silver Cross of the Virtuti Militari (War Order No. 08814, 23 December 1940)
Cross of Valour (Poland) and three bars
Distinguished Flying Cross (United Kingdom) (15 November 1942)

== See also ==
- List of RAF aircrew in the Battle of Britain
- Non-British personnel in the RAF during the Battle of Britain
