= Bolesław Drobiński =

Polish World War II flying ace

Bolesław Drobiński DFC
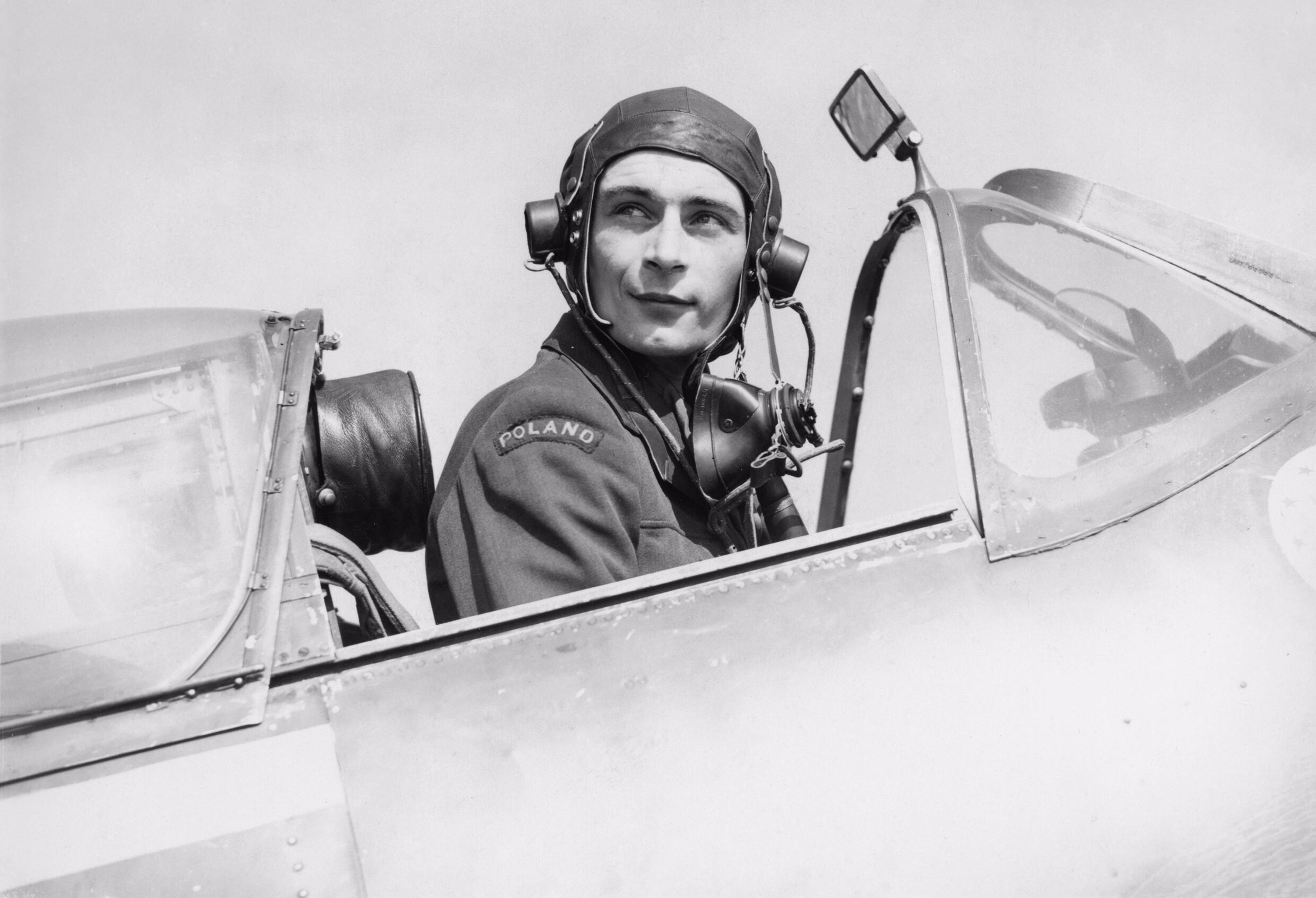
- Born: 23 October 1918; Ostroh, Poland
- Died: 26 July 1995 (aged 76); England
- Military career
- Allegiance: Poland; United Kingdom
- Branch: Polish Air Force; Royal Air Force
- Service years: 1937-1948
- Rank: Major
- Service number: 76731
- Units: No. 65 Squadron RAF; No. 303 Polish Fighter Squadron; No. 317 Polish Fighter Squadron
- Conflicts: Polish Defensive War, World War II
- Awards: Virtuti Militari; Cross of Valour; Distinguished Flying Cross (UK)

Bolesław Drobiński DFC (23 October 1918 – 26 July 1995) was a Polish fighter ace of the Polish Air Force in World War II with 7 confirmed kills and one shared.

== Biography ==
Drobiński made his first flight on a glider in 1934. On 2 January 1938 he entered the Polish Air Force Academy in Dęblin. After the Invasion of Poland he was evacuated to France via Romania and Italy, then he came to England.

On 11 September 1940 Drobiński was assigned to the No. 65 Squadron RAF and took part in the Battle of Britain. On 2 March 1941 he was posted to the No. 303 Polish Fighter Squadron. On 15 May 1941 he damaged a Ju 52 which was on the ground. On 21 June 1941 Drobiński heavily damaged the plane flown by German ace Adolf Galland and forced him to a crash-landing. From 18 March 1942 to 9 August 1942 he was an instructor in No. 58 Operational Training Unit at RAF Grangemouth. On 18 October 1943 he was ordered to No. 317 Polish Fighter Squadron. On 3 April 1944 he began to work in the Ministry of Defence. On 26 September 1944 he took command of No.303 Polish Fighter Squadron.

Drobiński was demobilized in 1948. He worked in the oil industry in America. In 1950's he settled in a village in Surrey. In 1960 he obtained British citizenship. In 1969 he acted as a technical advisor for the Battle of Britain, where he reunited with Galland, who was also a technical advisor for the movie. In 1943 he married a South African woman, they had two sons and a daughter.

== Aerial victory credits ==
- 18 June 1941 – 2 Bf 109
- 21 June 1941 – Bf 109
- 22 June 1941 – Bf 109
- 25 June 1941 – Bf 109
- 3 July 1941 – Bf 109
- 6 July 1941 – 1/3 Bf 109 (probably destroyed)
- 7 July 1941 – 1/2
- 24 July 1941 – Bf 109 (probably destroyed)
- 24 October 1941 – Bf 109 (probably destroyed)
- 13 March 1942 – Bf 109

== Awards ==
Virtuti Militari, Silver Cross
Cross of Valour (Poland), three times
Distinguished Flying Cross (United Kingdom)

== Bibliography ==
- Tadeusz Jerzy Krzystek, Anna Krzystek: Polskie Siły Powietrzne w Wielkiej Brytanii w latach 1940–1947 łącznie z Pomocniczą Lotniczą Służbą Kobiet (PLSK-WAAF). Sandomierz: Stratus, 2012, p. 161. ISBN 9788361421597
- Jerzy Pawlak: Absolwenci Szkoły Orląt: 1925-1939. Warszawa: Retro-Art, 2009, pp. 231–232. ISBN 8387992224
- Piotr Sikora: Asy polskiego lotnictwa. Warszawa: Oficyna Wydawnicza Alma-Press. 2014, p. 282-285. ISBN 9788370205607
- Zieliński, Józef (1994). Asy polskiego lotnictwa (in Polish). Warsaw: Agencja Lotnicza ALTAIR. p. 43. ISBN 83-86217-2. LCCN 95149065. OCLC 34751125. OL 865104M.
- Józef Zieliński: Lotnicy polscy w Bitwie o Wielką Brytanię. Warszawa: Oficyna Wydawnicza MH, 2005, pp. 39–40. ISBN 8390662043
- Józef Zieliński: 303 Dywizjon Myśliwski Warszawski im. Tadeusza Kościuszki. Warszawa: Bellona, 2003 ISBN 8311096309
