= Michał Maciejowski =

Polish fighter

Michał Maciejowski DFC** DFM
- Born: 29 October 1913; Gródek Jagielloński
- Died: 26 April 2001; Winnipeg, Manitoba, Canada
- Military career
- Allegiance: United Kingdom
- Branch: Royal Air Force
- Rank: podporucznik
- Service number: P-1912
- Units: 6 Pułk Lotniczy No. 111 Squadron RAF; No. 249 Squadron RAF; No. 317 Polish Fighter Squadron No. 316 Polish Fighter Squadron
- Conflicts: World War II
- Awards: Virtuti Militari; Polonia Restituta; Cross of Valour; Distinguished Flying Medal (UK); Distinguished Flying Cross (UK)

Michał Mirosław Karol Maciejowski DFC** DFM Lt. pilot. F / L. P-1912 was a Polish fighter ace of the Polish Air Force in World War II.

== Early life ==
Maciejowski (Michael Manson) was born on 29 October 1913, in Gródek Jagielloński. In Rzeszów, he completed the 6-year Jan Sobieski gymnasium. He completed a 2-year Trade School course in Lviv.

== Military service ==
He was appointed to perform military service in the 40th Infantry Regiment. In 1935, he volunteered to become a pilot to the 6th Pułk Lotniczy in Lviv. From 1936 to 1939 he served in the 6th Aviation Regiment, where he trained as a corpsman. On 9 September, together with the staff of the Regiment, he moved to Łuck and Kleań, and on 12 September to Kuty. On 17 September, he crossed the border of Romania. He was interned there, but escaped and boarded a ship bound for Syria. At the beginning of 1940, he swam to Marseilles. He arrived in Great Britain in February. He trained at RAF Blackpool Center, assigned to the British 111 Fighter Squadron. On 4 September 1940, he shot down his first plane. During the Battle of Britain he shot down three German planes, and probably damaged one. He fought in the British 249 Fighter Squadron. After training in the 52nd OTU, he was assigned to the 317 Fighter Squadron. He also fought in the 316 Fighter Squadron. On 9 August 1943, around 6.30 p.m. during the Ramrod 191 mission he piloted the Spitfire IX designated SZ-E No. BS302. While flying over occupied France, he collided with Lieutenant Lech Kondracki (Spitfire IX marked SZ-R no. BS457). Kondracki died while Maciejowski saved himself by parachuting to the ground. He was captured and Imprisoned in Stalag Luft III. He was liberated and restored to service on 1 June 1945. After a refresher course at 16 FTS Newton, on 21 August, he was assigned to Squadron 309 in Coltishall. He remained in the squadron until its dissolution in January 1947.

He was demobilized from the army with the rank of aviation lieutenant. He changed his name to Michael Manson. He returned to the RAF in June 1951, initially as a test pilot and from 1963 he performed administrative work, before becoming a catering officer. In 1970, he ran the RAF Transit Hotel in Malta. He retired in 1972 as an aviation lieutenant. He lived in England until the death of his wife Christine. In 1987, he moved to Winnipeg, Canada, to live with his only daughter, Karen Schmidt. He died on 26 April 2001, in Winnipeg at age 87.

== Awards ==
- Virtuti Militari, Silver Cross
- Cross of Valour (Poland), three times
- Distinguished Flying Cross (United Kingdom)
- Distinguished Flying Medal
