= Stefan Janus =

Stefan Janus DSO DFC
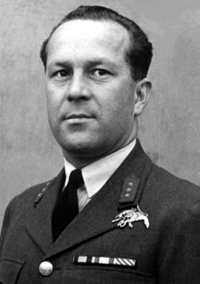
- Stefan Janus
- Born: 22 March 1910; Wola Duchacka, Poland
- Died: 11 November 1978 (aged 68); East Farleigh, England
- Military career
- Allegiance: Poland; United Kingdom
- Branch: Polish Air Force; Royal Air Force
- Service years: 1931–1965
- Rank: wing commander
- Service number: P-0700
- Units: No. 308 Polish Fighter Squadron; No. 315 Polish Fighter Squadron
- Commands: No. 315 Polish Fighter Squadron; No. 131 Wing RAF
- Conflicts: Polish Defensive War, World War II
- Awards: Virtuti Militari; Cross of Valour; Distinguished Flying Cross (United Kingdom); Distinguished Service Order;Air Force Medal for War 1939-45 (Poland)

Stefan Janus (22 March 1910 – 11 November 1978), DSO, DFC was a Polish fighter ace of the Polish Air Force in World War II with 6 confirmed kills.

== Biography ==
=== Early life ===
Janus was born in Wola Duchacka (today a district of Kraków) in 1910. In 1931 he was drafted into army and sent to Volyn Cadet School for Artillery Reserve Officers (Wołyńska Szkoła Podchorążych Rezerwy Artylerii) in Włodzimierz Wołynski. One year later he was assigned to 7th Artillery Regiment in Częstochowa. Then he studied at the artillery school in Toruń. On 15 August 1934 Janus was named second lieutenant (podporucznik).

After his promotion, Janus volunteered for Polish Air Force Academy in Dęblin. In 1935 he was ordered to the 2nd Air Regiment in Cracow where he flew light bomber and reconnaissance aircraft Breguet 19. In 1936 he was sent to flight school in Grudziądz and graduated as fighter pilot. Then he came back to Cracow where he flew PZL P.7. Since October 1938 Janus served as instructor in Air Force Academy.

=== World War II ===
During the Invasion of Poland Janus was evacuated to Hungary via Romania. He was interned in Nagykáta but on 26 October he escaped and arrived in France via Yugoslavia and Greece. In November 1939 he came to the Air Training Centre in Lyon. In February 1940 he was sent to North Africa. After the Battle of France Janus arrived in the United Kingdom.

Initially he was assigned to the No. 308 Polish Fighter Squadron where he flew Hurricanes. From May 1941 Janus flew Spitfires over Europe. In July 1941 he was attacked by three Bf 109s and shot down one of them. In late September he downed another Messerschmitt and in late October he destroyed two German planes. The next month Janus took command of the No. 315 Polish Fighter Squadron. In December 1941 he became a fighter ace downing his 5th plane. In April 1942 he took command of the No. 131 Wing RAF. He scored his last victory on 26 July 1942.

Janus participated in the Dieppe Raid. He received his Distinguished Service Order for the command in operation.

On 26 January 1943 over France, Janus collided with another plane. He jumped with a parachute. Captured by Germans he was sent to Stalag Luft III. He tried to escape on 15 August with a group of prisoners. One of them spoke fluent German, had a stolen uniform and a fake ID. Unfortunately guards sounded the alarm. Janus was liberated in May 1945.

=== Post-war career ===
Janus came back to the United Kingdom on 9 May 1945 and was sent on leave to convalesce. On 17 September he returned to service. In early 1947 he joined the Polish Resettlement Corps. Janus served in the RAF until 1965. In the same year he had a Myocardial infarction and was sent into retirement.

Stefan Janus died on 11 November 1978.

== Awards ==
Virtuti Militari, Silver Cross
Cross of Valour (Poland), four times
Air Force Medal for War 1939-45 (Poland)
Distinguished Flying Cross (United Kingdom)
Distinguished Service Order
