= Kazimierz Sporny =

Kazimierz Sporny DFC
- Born: 17 February 1916; Poznań
- Died: 17 May 1949 (aged 33); Twyford Abbey, London, England
- Military career
- Allegiance: Poland; France; United Kingdom
- Branch: Polish Air Force; France Armée de l'Air; Royal Air Force
- Rank: Flight Lieutenant
- Service number: P-0448
- Units: 3rd Aviation Regiment; No. 303 Polish Fighter Squadron
- Conflicts: Polish Defensive War, World War II
- Awards: Virtuti Militari; Cross of Valour; Distinguished Flying Cross (UK)

Kazimierz Sporny DFC (17 February 1916 – 17 May 1949) was a Polish fighter ace of the Polish Air Force in World War II with 5 confirmed kills.

== Biography ==
Sporny was born in 1916, he was graduated from the Polish Air Force Academy in 1936. He was assigned to the 3rd Aviation Regiment. On 17 September he crossed the border with Romania then via Yugoslavia and Italy he reached France. After the Battle of France he arrived in the UK where he served in the No. 303 Polish Fighter Squadron. Sporny scored his first victory on 30 December 1940 on a Bf 109. He volunteered to the Polish Fighting Team.

On 18 July 1946 he married Margaret McArthur.

Kazimierz Sporny died from a brain cancer on 17 May 1949. On 25 August 2016 his remains were brought to Poznań by Polish Air Force's CASA C-295 and buried in Miłostowo cemetery, with an honorary flypast by the F-16 fighter jets.

== Aerial victory credits ==
- Bf 109 4 – September 1940 (probably destroyed)
- Bf 109 – 30 December 1940
- Bf 109 – 7 April 1943
- 2 Bf 109 – 22 April 1943
- Bf 109 – 24 June 1944
- Fw 190 – 24 June 1944 (damaged)

== Awards ==
Virtuti Militari, Silver Cross
Cross of Valour (Poland), three times
Distinguished Flying Cross (United Kingdom)
