= Stefan Witorzeńć =

Polish fighter pilot and officer (1908–1994)

Stefan Witorzeńć DFC
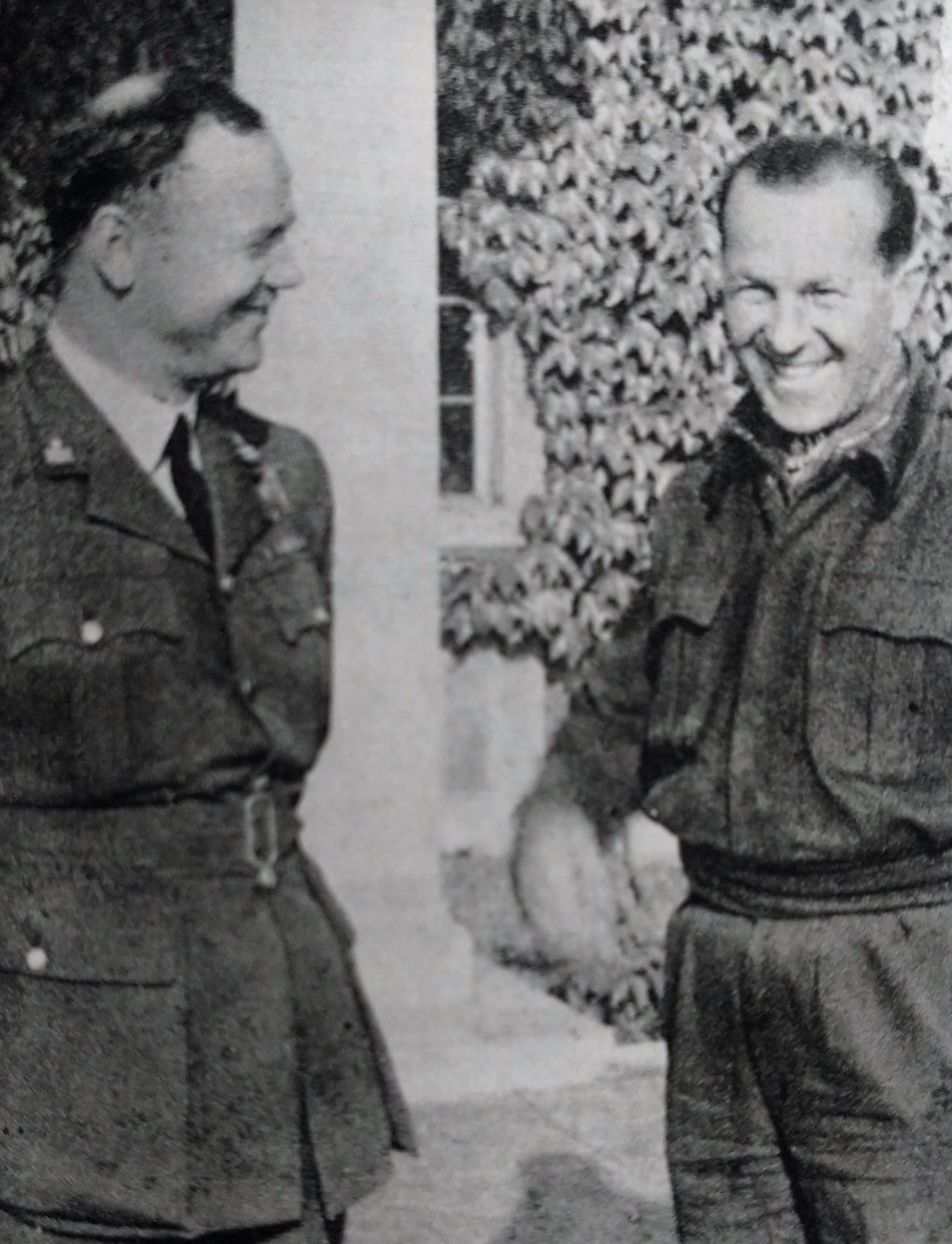
- Witorzenc (left) and Stefan Janus (right)
- Born: 2 January 1908; Lida, Russian Empire
- Died: 30 December 1994 (aged 86); Warsaw
- Military career
- Allegiance: Poland; United Kingdom
- Branch: Polish Air Force; Royal Air Force
- Rank: Group Captain
- Service number: 76730
- Units: No. 501 Squadron RAF; No. 306 Polish Fighter Squadron; No. 302 Polish Fighter Squadron
- Commands: No. 306 Polish Fighter Squadron; No. 302 Polish Fighter Squadron; No. 133 Wing RAF
- Conflicts: Polish Defensive War, World War II
- Awards: Virtuti Militari; Cross of Valour; Distinguished Flying Cross (United Kingdom); Order of Polonia Restituta

Stefan Witorzeńć (2 January 1908 – 30 December 1994) DFC was a Polish fighter ace of the Polish Air Force in World War II with 5 confirmed kills and one shared.

== Biography ==
Stefan Witorzeńć was born in 1908 to a noble family. In 1930 he completed the Reserve Officers School of Infantry. In 1932 he was graduated from the Polish Air Force Academy. He served in the 3rd Aviation Regiment in Poznań, then he was an instructor in the Higher Pilot School in Grudziądz.

In the September Campaign he defended the region of Dęblin. He was evacuated to the UK via Romania and France. On 6 August 1940 he was ordered to the No. 501 Squadron RAF where flew with Stanisław Skalski. During the Battle of Britain Witorzeńć scored 4 victories and one shared. On 18 August he shot down the German ace Horst Tietzen. On 17 November 1940 he was transferred to the No. 306 Polish Fighter Squadron and 5 days after he took command of the A flight. In March 1941 he was promoted captain. On 14 May 1941 he was posted to the No. 302 Polish Fighter Squadron, on 27 May he became commander of his squadron. On 24 November 1941 he was given command of the No. 133 Wing RAF. On 1 June 1942 he received the Distinguished Flying Cross. From 25 September 1942 to 24 April 1944 he was the liaison officer, then he became the training director of the No.61 OTU. From August 1944 he served in command of the No. 133 Wing RAF at the same time he realized combat missions.

On 7 January 1945 Witorzeńć became commander of the No. 25 (Polish) Elementary Flying Training School (EFTS). He came back to Poland in 1948 but it was only in 1957, after the end of Stalinism, he was allowed to join the Polish People's Army Air Force. He served in the Air Force Command then he was given command of the Air Training Centre in Modlin. In 1968 he went into the reserve. In 1991 he became president of the Polish Air Force Association.

Stefan Witorzeńć died on 30 December 1994. He is buried at the Powązki Cemetery

== Aerial victory credits ==
- Bf 110 - 12 August 1940 (damaged)
- 2 x Ju 87 – 15 August 1940
- Bf 109 – 18 August 1940
- Ju 88 - 24 August 1940 (damaged)
- Do 215 – 2 September 1940
- 1/2 Do 215 – 11 September 1940
- Bf 109 – 4 September 1941

== Awards ==
Virtuti Militari, Silver Cross
Cross of Valour (Poland)
Distinguished Flying Cross (United Kingdom)
Commander's Cross with Star of Polonia Restituta
