= Jakub Bargiełowski =

Polish fighter pilot

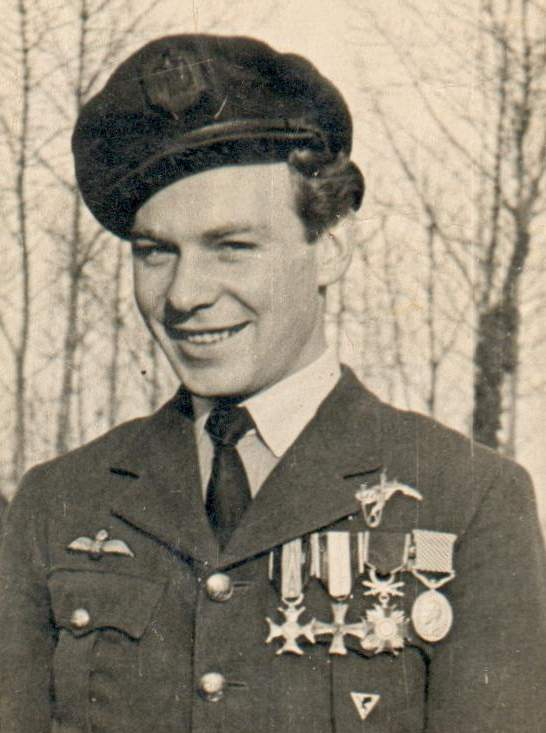
- Born: 25 July 1921; Garbów, Poland
- Died: 21 February 2010; Sydney
- Military career
- Allegiance: Poland; United Kingdom
- Branch: Polish Air Force; Royal Air Force
- Rank: Warrant Officer
- Service number: 794457
- Units: No. 315 Polish Fighter Squadron; No. 303 Polish Fighter Squadron
- Conflicts: Polish Defensive War, World War II
- Awards: Virtuti Militari; Cross of Valour; Cross of Merit with Swords; Distinguished Flying Medal, Air Force Medal 1939-45, 1939–1945 Star, Air Crew Europe Star, Defence Medal, War Medal 1939–1945

Jakub Bargiełowski (1921–2010) was a Polish fighter ace of the Polish Air Force in World War II with 5 confirmed kills.

== Biography ==
Bargiełowski was born in Garbów near Lublin. In 1936 he entered the Air Force Non-Commissioned Officer's School for minors in Bydgoszcz, then he was sent to the High Aviation School in Ułęż. After the Soviet invasion of Poland the school began the evacuation to Romania, unfortunately on 18 September Bargiełowski was captured by Red Army and sent to Yelenovskiye Rudniki on Black Sea, where he worked at a stone pit until May 1940. He was deported to Siberia where he spent 14 months working in taiga. Due to starvation he suffered from blindness, dysentery, and scorbutic paralysis. After the Sikorski–Mayski agreement, Bargiełowski was released on 4 September 1941 and arrived in Scotland by sea on 13 November 1941.

He started training on 20 January 1943 on after a long treatment. On 28 September 1943 he was posted to No. 61 OTU for fighter pilot's operational training. Finally on 24 January 1944 he was assigned to the No. 315 Polish Fighter Squadron. On 12 June 1944 he scored his first double victory shooting down two Fw 190. On 18 August he downed two Fw 190 and damaged two others. He scored his last victory on 11 December. He also shot down three flying bombs V-1. From 2 May 1945 he served as instructor in the No. 61 OTU as instructor, and on 24 July he returned to No. 315. On 17 November he was transferred to the No. 303 Polish Fighter Squadron where he served until it was disbanded on 11 December 1946.

In May 1948 he emigrated to Australia, setting up a business in jewelry. Jakub Bargiełowski died on 21 February 2010 in Sydney.

== Aerial victory credits ==
- 2 Fw 190 – 12 June 1944
- Bf 109 – 24 June 1944 (damaged)
- 2 Fw 190 – 18 August 1944 (and two others damaged)
- Fw 190 – 11 December 1944

== Awards ==
Virtuti Militari, Silver Cross
Cross of Valour, three times
Cross of Merit with Swords
Distinguished Flying Medal
Air Force Medal 1939-45 (Medal Lotniczy)
1939–1945 Star
Air Crew Europe Star
Defence Medal
War Medal 1939–1945
