= Brian Carbury =

New Zealand-born British World War II flying ace

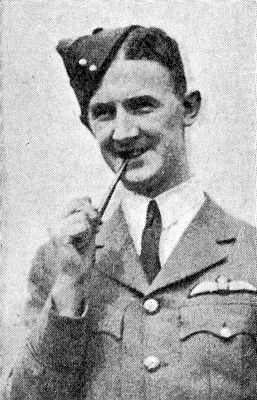
- Born: 27 February 1918; Wellington, New Zealand
- Died: 31 July 1961 (aged 43); Bourne End, Buckinghamshire, England
- Military career
- Allegiance: United Kingdom
- Branch: Royal Air Force
- Service years: 1937–1941
- Rank: Flying Officer
- Units: No. 41 Squadron; No. 603 (City of Edinburgh) Squadron
- Conflicts: Second World War; Battle of Britain
- Awards: Distinguished Flying Cross & Bar

Brian Carbury, DFC & Bar (27 February 1918 – 31 July 1961) was a New Zealand fighter ace of the Royal Air Force (RAF) during the Second World War. He was officially credited with destroying 15 1/2 German aircraft.

Born in Wellington, Carbury joined the RAF in 1937 after being rejected by the Royal Navy. After completion of his flight training, he was posted to No. 41 Squadron where he learnt to fly Supermarine Spitfire fighters. He was later sent to No. 603 (City of Edinburgh) Squadron to train its pilots how to handle the Spitfire. During the early stages of the Second World War, the squadron was based in Scotland and patrolled the North Sea during which time Carbury was credited with damaging at least three bombers. The squadron shifted south in August 1940 to join in the Battle of Britain. He shot down a number of German aircraft over the following weeks, including five on 31 August; he was one of three RAF pilots to achieve the feat of destroying five aircraft in one day during the Battle of Britain.

In late 1940, Carbury's squadron moved north and began operating from Scotland. At the end of the year, he was posted to No. 58 Operational Training Unit on instructing duties. In October 1941 he was courtmartialed for dishonesty offences and discharged from the RAF. However, he may have continued on instructing duties until 1944. After the war, he was involved in efforts to illegally export fighter aircraft to Palestine. He died in 1961 of leukaemia.

== Early life ==
Brian John George Carbury was born in Wellington on 27 February 1918, the son of Herbert Carbury, an Irish immigrant who was a veterinarian and worked with horses. He later moved the Carbury family to Auckland, and started specialising in the treatment of small animals. Carbury was educated at King's College but left after three years of schooling. He found employment selling shoes at the Farmers' Trading Company. Tiring of retail work, he headed to the United Kingdom in June 1937 to pursue a military career. He wanted to join the Royal Navy but on being told he was too old, he instead applied for the Royal Air Force (RAF) on a short service commission.

== Military career ==
Accepted for the RAF, Carbury began training in September 1937 and later in the year was appointed an acting pilot officer. His first posting, in June 1938, was to No. 41 Squadron which was based at Catterick in Yorkshire and operated the Hawker Fury bi-plane fighter. His pilot officer rank was confirmed a few months later. The squadron began converting to Supermarine Spitfire fighters in January 1939. In August, Carbury was posted to RAF Turnhouse near Edinburgh, Scotland, to join No. 603 (City of Edinburgh) Squadron of the Auxiliary Air Force (AAF) as a training officer. Being an AAF squadron, the pilots of No. 603 Squadron were weekend 'part-time' airmen from Edinburgh and the surrounding area. Carbury's work, as a by now experienced Spitfire pilot, was to help the amateur airmen convert to the aircraft. As war approached the squadron was mobilised and Carbury's posting, initially just temporary, was made permanent upon the outbreak of the war with Germany in September 1939.

== Second World War ==
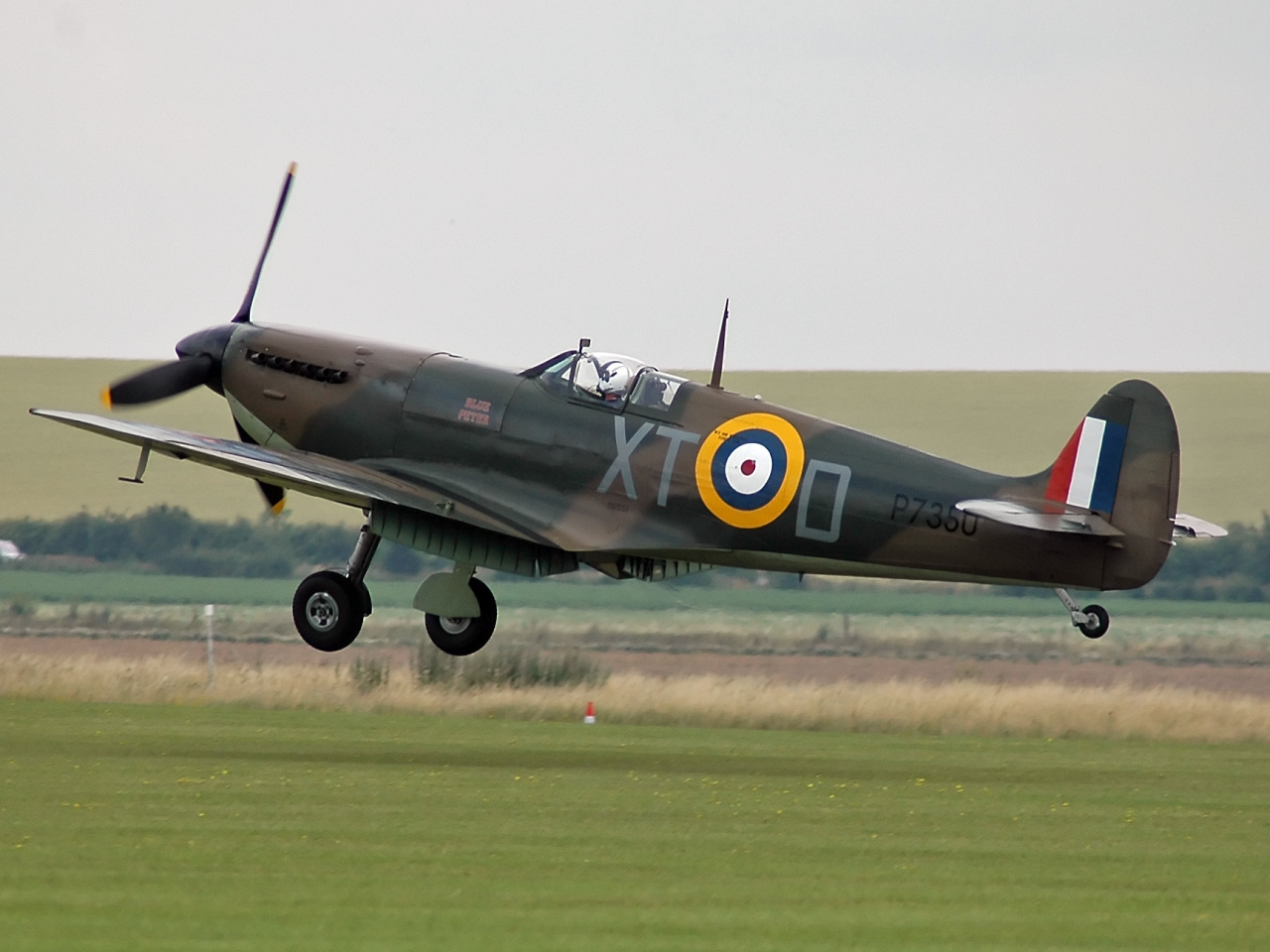
A Spitfire IIA restored in the colours of No. 603 Squadron as it appeared during the Battle of Britain

No. 603 Squadron's first encounter with the enemy was on 16 October 1939, when the Luftwaffe mounted its first raid of the war on Britain. A section of the squadron had taken off to intercept bombers targeting shipping in the Firth of Forth and shot down a Junkers Ju 88 east of Dalkeith. The destroyed German aircraft was the first to be shot down over Britain during the Second World War. Another Ju 88 was badly damaged in the encounter and crashed in Holland. Carbury, although flying that day, was not involved in the action.

In early December, Carbury was part of a detachment of No. 603 Squadron sent to Montrose to provide fighter cover there. In this role, he and two other pilots attacked a group of seven Heinkel He 111 bombers on 7 December. He claimed a damaged He 111, observing smoke coming from both engines of the bomber as it turned away although he was unable to pursue it due to a lack of fuel. On 18 January 1940, reunited with the main body of No. 603 Squadron which was now flying from the RAF station at Dyce, he claimed a third share in the destruction of another He 111. The squadron carried out patrols and training over the spring and summer of 1940. During this time, he was promoted to flying officer and also shared in the destruction of two more German bombers, a He 111 in March and a Ju 88 in July. By this stage, the pilots of No. 603 Squadron were eager to join in the fighting over southern England. Among them was the Australian Richard Hillary, who on arrival at the squadron in early July, was greeted by Carbury and immediately invited to drinks in the mess.

=== Battle of Britain ===
No. 603 Squadron became involved in the Battle of Britain on 27 August 1940, when it redeployed to RAF Hornchurch to replace a battle weary No. 65 Squadron. Carbury flew two patrols the day after the squadron's arrival, encountering a group of Messerschmitt Bf 109 fighters on both occasions. He claimed a damaged Bf 109 but three of the squadron's pilots were killed. He claimed his first solo victory, a Bf 109, over Manston on 29 August. Another Bf 109 was shot down near Canterbury the next day. On 31 August, he flew three patrols. On the first, in the morning, he shot down a Bf 109, one of a group of 20 that the squadron encountered over Canterbury. On the second patrol carried out in the early afternoon, he and several other pilots attacked He 111s that were raiding Hornchurch. He shot down two of the bombers. Then, on the final patrol of the day, he destroyed two Bf 109s near Southend. His own aircraft was damaged in this encounter and he received an injury to his foot. His efforts of the day not only saw him become a fighter ace, but also one of only three pilots of the RAF to be credited with destroying five enemy aircraft in a day during the Battle of Britain. (Note: The other pilots to achieve this feat was the Polish pilot Antoni Glowacki, who later flew with the Royal New Zealand Air Force and Scotsman Archie McKellar, a Hurricane pilot killed in action shortly after the end of the Battle of Britain.)

On 2 September Carbury claimed a Bf 109 as destroyed. Now officially credited with at least eight German aircraft destroyed, his exploits were recognised by the award of the Distinguished Flying Cross (DFC). The award was gazetted on 24 September 1940, and the published citation read:

During operations on the North East coast Flying Officer Carbury led his section in an attack on two enemy aircraft. Both were destroyed. From 28th August, 1940, to 2nd September, 1940, he has, with his squadron, been almost continuously engaged against large enemy raids over Kent, and has destroyed eight enemy aircraft. Five of these were shot down during three successive engagements in one day.

— London Gazette, No. 34951, 24 September 1940.

On 7 September the Luftwaffe mounted its first large scale daylight bombing raid on London. No. 603 Squadron caught part of the bombing formation on its return flight to France and Carbury shot down an escorting Bf 109 and damaged two bombers. He damaged a He 111 on 11 September and destroyed a Bf 109 on 14 September, near London. Towards the end of the month, the pace of the aerial fighting began to slow down with the Luftwaffe changing its tactics by using Bf 109s in a fighter-bomber role for daylight attacks. Carbury's next victory did not occur until 2 October, when he shot down a Bf 109 over the Thames Estuary. He destroyed another over southeast London on 7 October. Flying a patrol on 10 October as the leader of a section of three Spitfires, he spotted a group of 20 Bf 109s returning to northern France. Leading the section into attack, he shot down one of the Bf 109s into the English Channel and a second on to the beach at Dunkirk. On 14 October, he damaged a Ju 88.

By the end of October 1940, Carbury was officially credited with 15 1/2 victories, the fifth highest scoring RAF pilot of the Battle of Britain. He was awarded a bar to the DFC he had received the previous month, one of only a few pilots so recognised during the period of the battle. The award of the bar was gazetted on 25 October 1940, the citation reading:

Flying Officer Carbury has displayed outstanding gallantry and skill in engagements against the enemy. Previous to 8th September, 1940, this officer shot down eight enemy aircraft, and shared in the destruction of two others. Since that date he has destroyed two Messerschmitt 109's and two Heinkel 113's, and, in company with other pilots of his squadron, also assisted in the destruction of yet another two enemy aircraft. His cool courage in the face of the enemy has been a splendid example to other pilots of his squadron.

— London Gazette, No. 34978, 25 October 1940.

=== Move to the North ===
At the start of December 1940, No. 603 Squadron moved to the RAF base at Rochford, near Southend, for two weeks before shifting to Scotland, based at Drem. On Christmas Day, Carbury took off in pursuit of a Ju 88 flying off St Abb's Head. The German aircraft made for home after Carbury inflicted some damage. At the end of the year, he was posted to No. 58 Operational Training Unit, based at Grangemouth, as an instructor and did not fly operationally in combat again. By this time, in addition to his 15 1/2 confirmed kills, he was also credited with two probables and five damaged enemy aircraft. He was the seventh highest scoring New Zealand fighter ace of the Second World War.

In October 1941 Carbury was charged with fraud after being accused of passing false cheques. His wife had expensive tastes and incurred bills that he could not pay. It was also alleged that he had deserted and misrepresented his rank by wearing the markings of a flight lieutenant. He was courtmartialled and dismissed from the RAF, a punishment announced in the London Gazette on 21 October 1941. According to aviation historian Kenneth Wynn, he continued on instructing duties until 1944. He divorced his wife and later remarried.

== Later life ==
After leaving the RAF, Carbury continued to live in England. In 1949, he was involved with an effort to provide military equipment to Palestine. He was reportedly paid £500 to deliver a Bristol Beaufighter heavy fighter to Palestine and flew it there from England, with stops at Corsica and Yugoslavia. Afterwards he was charged with the illegal export of the Beaufighter and fined a total of £100. Three co-offenders received the same sentence. He later worked in London for a heating and ventilation company. He died of leukaemia on 31 July 1961 at Bourne End in Buckinghamshire, survived by his second wife and a son.
