= Bolesław Gładych =

Polish-American World War II flying ace

Bolesław Michal Gładych
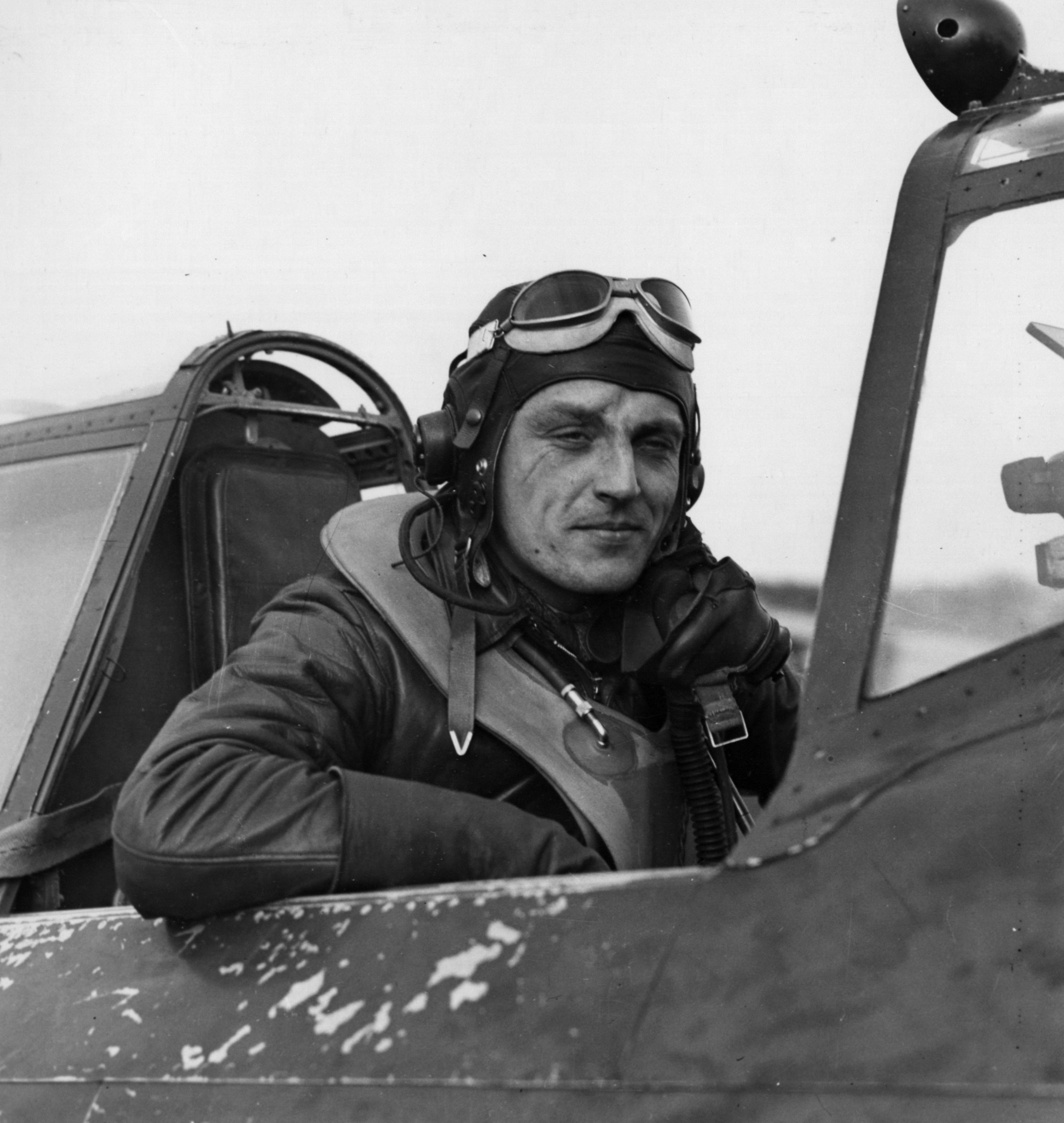
- Born: 17 May 1918; Poland
- Died: 12 July 2011 (aged 93); Seattle, Washington, U.S.
- Military career
- Allegiance: Polish Air Force; Armee de l'Air; Royal Air Force; U.S. Army Air Forces
- Service years: 1939-1946
- Rank: Flight Lieutenant (Flight commander)
- Nickname: Killer Mike
- Service number: P-1392
- Units: Groupe de Chasse I/145; No. 303 Squadron; No. 302 Squadron; 61st Fighter Squadron, 56th Fighter Group
- Conflicts: World War II

Bolesław Michal Gładych (17 May 1918 – 12 July 2011) was a Polish fighter pilot, a flying ace of World War II. He was born in Warsaw.

== Polish Air Force ==
As a boy, Gladych was expelled from various schools, before choosing a military career. He graduated summa cum laude from the Polish Air Force Academy. He was commissioned on 1 September 1939, too late to see active service in the Polish campaign. He led a group of newly commissioned pilots to evacuate the PZL P.7 fighters of the Polish Pilot's School to neutral Romania. Escaping from the Romanian internment camp Turnu Severin (reputedly killing a guard in the process) he reached France, where he joined the recently formed Polish manned "Finnish" Squadron, intended to participate in the Finnish-Soviet war. The squadron became an Armee de l'Air Polish volunteer unit - Groupe de Chasse I/145. The unit was equipped with the experimental Caudron C.714 "Cyclone" fighter.

Later, Gladych recalled an air combat with a Bf 109E on 10 June 1940. After a long dogfight, the Pole's fighter was severely damaged. The pilot of the Messerschmitt - with the number "13" on its side - simply waggled his wings and disengaged. This, according to Gladych, was the first of several encounters with Luftwaffe ace Hauptmann Georg-Peter Eder. (Although according to Luftwaffe records Eder flew his first sorties with JG 51 in September 1940.)

Reputedly, 'Mike' claimed several air victories with the French Air Force, although this cannot be confirmed from surviving records.

== Royal Air Force ==
Gladych did reach the UK in 1940, attending 57 OTU before transferring to the famous No. 303 Polish Fighter Squadron in October 1940, although again records suggest a later arrival in 1941. He claimed 3 Bf 109's shot down and a probable in 2 sorties on 23 June 1941, although after the second sortie he then crashed his damaged Spitfire at RAF Manston, and hit a telegraph pole, receiving a fractured skull, facial cuts, and a fractured collarbone.

Gladych returned to operations in October 1941 and was transferred to 302 Squadron "City of Poznan' in July 1942, joining it after recuperative leave in December 1942. By May he was a flight commander and had been promoted to Flight Lieutenant.

Gladych detailed in a magazine article years later (Real magazine, New York, April–May 1960) another encounter with Hauptmann Georg-Peter Eder. After crippling Gladych's Spitfire in the spring of 1943, yet again Eder flew alongside his victim and waggled his wings, before flying away.

The two aces possibly met in combat once more in 1944, when again Eder shot up Gladych's P-47 aircraft over Vechta, but the Pole cleverly tricked Eder by flying through the German flak barrage to escape. (Apparently in 1950 Eder and Gladych met by chance at a pilots reunion in Frankfurt and managed to confirm they had been adversaries in each case.)

Another story relating to Gladych is that in the autumn of 1943 Gladych mistakenly almost shot down the aircraft carrying Prime Minister Winston Churchill. RAF Fighter Command grounded Gladych as a punishment.

== United States Army Air Forces ==
After ending his second RAF tour in January 1944, Gladych, along with fellow Pole Flt Lt. Witold Lanowski, arranged a wholly unofficial secondment to the 56th Fighter Group of the U.S. Army Air Forces in early 1944. Recruited by Major Francis Gabreski of the 56th, who as a captain had previously been attached to the RAF Polish Fighter Wing in 1942, Gladych helped organized battle training for American replacement pilots, and was assigned to Gabreski's 61st Fighter Squadron. On 21 February 1944 Mike downed 2 Bf 109s in a single sortie.

When the Polish authorities became aware of the arrangement in June 1944 they attempted to discipline the pair with threats of expulsion from the Polish Air Force. Both continued to fly with the Americans, however, and were consequently expelled. Therefore, Gladych's combat claims with the USAAF are not recognised by the Polish Air Force. Gladych was not formally accepted into the USAAF either (his kill credits were officially recognized, however), and continued to fly unofficially until October 1944, when the Polish Air Force finally relented and sanctioned his secondment. Gladych was carried in American records by his RAF rank of squadron leader but was known in the unit by his equivalent American rank of major. He became the leading figure among six Polish pilots flying with the 61st Fighter Squadron, all but one of whom survived the war.

Gladych had claimed a further 10 air kills and 5 ground kills by the end of September 1944. Gladych reported that on 8 March 1944 while escorting bombers to Berlin, he engaged three Focke-Wulf Fw 190s. Low on fuel, he attempted to disengage after shooting down one of the Fw 190s, but the other two fighters boxed him in and tried to force him to land. As he approached a German airfield configured for landing, Gladych suddenly opened fire on the airfield with his remaining ammunition. German flak gunners responded, but missed Gladych and shot down the two following Fw 190s. When he crossed the English coast his P-47 ran out of fuel, forcing Gladych to bail out.

It was then claimed he flew further (unofficial?) operations with an unnamed P-51 group, claiming a Me 262 jet downed, but this is not confirmed by USAAF records and his ten credited kills were all made with the 61st FS. It is also claimed he intentionally understated the total of his air victories lest he be promoted and transferred off combat duties.

He was awarded the Virtuti Militari, Cross of Valour with three bars by the Polish Air Force, the DFC by the RAF, and the Silver Star and two clusters, the Air Medal and three clusters by the USAAF. He also claimed to have been awarded the Croix de Guerre for the sortie on 8 March 1944 when he strafed an airfield after shooting down an Fw 190.

He nicknamed the numerous P-47's assigned to him Pengie, after the nickname of his then girlfriend, a Canadian WAAF, continuing the series up to Pengie V as he received newer aircraft. The name included a cartoon image of a penguin on the left side of the engine cowling.

His wartime 'score' totals 17 claimed destroyed, 2 probables, 1 shared damaged, and 5 ground kills. His ten kills with the 56th FG are officially recognized by the U.S. Air Force, as are the 4 kills by Lanowski. (USAF Historical Study No. 85: USAF Credits for the Destruction of Enemy Aircraft, World War II, Air Force Historical Research Agency).

== Post-war biography ==
After the war ended, Gladych was allegedly involved in black market smuggling across Europe. In the early 1950s, he was recruited by the CIA to join a newly composed Project ARTICHOKE operating from Washington DC.

He also located his brother (a Polish resistance fighter) in a German POW camp in Austria, which had been liberated by the Russians in 1945. Anticipating the fact that most of the Polish resistance falling into the hands of the Soviets were likely to be deported to Siberia, Gladych used his USAAF status to visit the camp and managed to smuggle his brother out to the West.

After the war Gladych emigrated to Seattle, Washington, and became a United States citizen. Until his death, he lived in the area where he practiced psychotherapy. He was a long-term practitioner of Yoga Nidra and integrated yoga into his therapeutic approach.

== Honours and awards ==
Silver Cross of the Virtuti Militari
Cross of Valour (Poland) four awards
Distinguished Flying Cross (United Kingdom)
Silver Star and two clusters (United States)
Distinguished Flying Cross - twice (United States)
Air Medal and three clusters (United States)
Croix de Guerre (France) (personal claim)

== Sources ==
- Chronicles of Courage An interview with Michal Gladych, 13 September 2002
- Horrido- Raymond Toliver & Trevor Constable (bantam Books 1977)
- Aces High- Christopher Shores & Clive Williams (Grub Street 1994)
- Aces High(Volume 2) - Christopher Shores (Grub Street 1999), Page 95.
- The Real Roots of the CIA's Rendition and Black Sites Program
- Tadeusz Jerzy Krzystek, Anna Krzystek: Polskie Siły Powietrzne w Wielkiej Brytanii w latach 1940-1947 łącznie z Pomocniczą Lotniczą Służbą Kobiet (PLSK-WAAF). Sandomierz: Stratus, 2012, s. 196. ISBN 9788361421597
- Jerzy Pawlak: Absolwenci Szkoły Orląt: 1925-1939. Warszawa: Retro-Art, 2009, s. 233. ISBN 8387992224
- Piotr Sikora: Asy polskiego lotnictwa. Warszawa: Oficyna Wydawnicza Alma-Press. 2014, s. 174-181. ISBN 9788370205607
- Zieliński, Józef (1994). Asy polskiego lotnictwa (in Polish). Warsaw: Agencja Lotnicza ALTAIR. p. 14. ISBN 83-86217-2. LCCN 95149065. OCLC 34751125. OL 865104M.
