= Stanisław Blok =

Stanisław Blok DFC
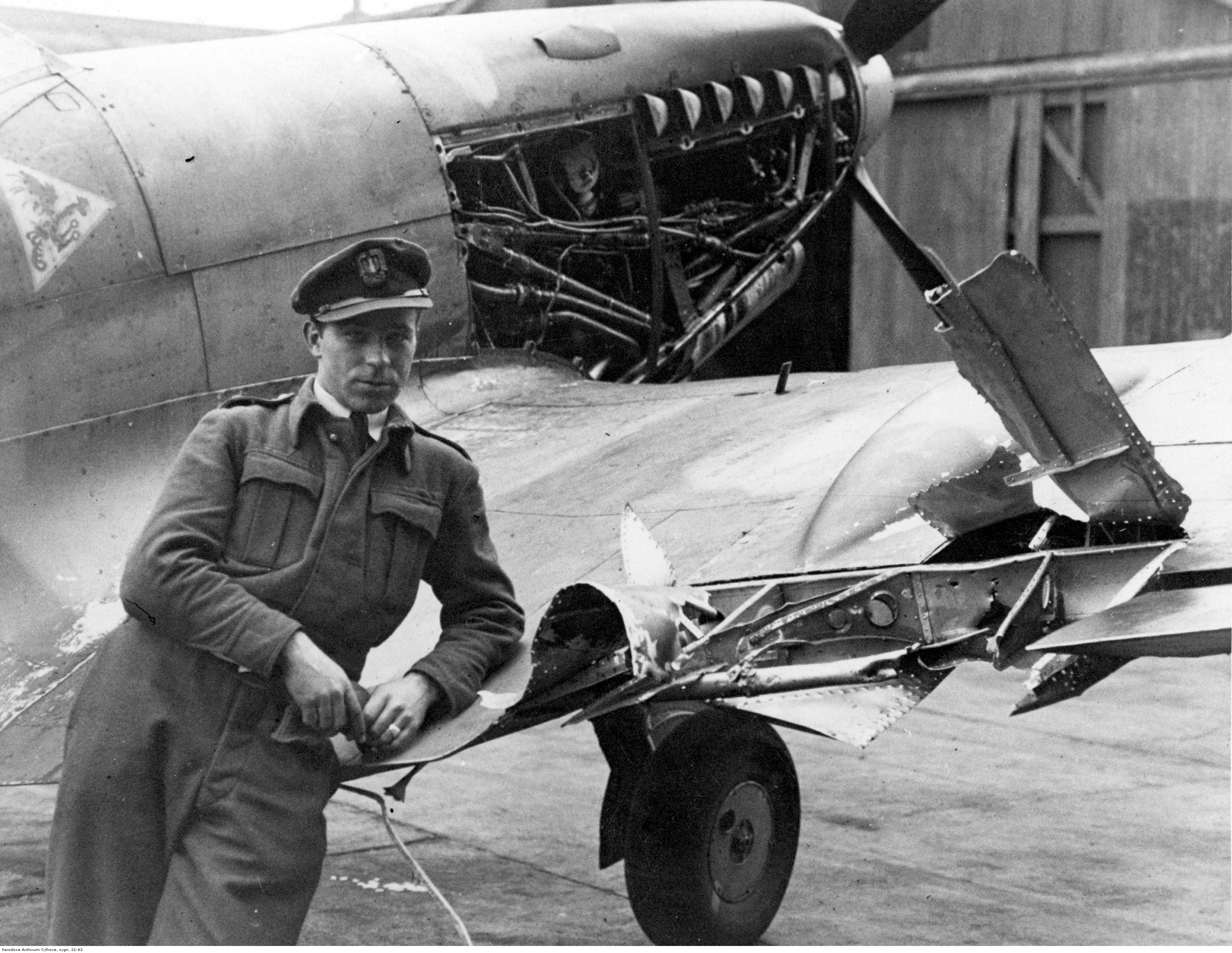
- Born: 15 April 1916; Wejherowo
- Died: 17 September 1994 (aged 78); United Kingdom
- Military career
- Allegiance: Poland; United Kingdom
- Branch: Polish Air Force; Royal Air Force
- Rank: Flight Lieutenant
- Service number: P-1681
- Units: No. 315 Polish Fighter Squadron; No. 164 Squadron RAF; No. 603 Squadron RAF; No. 54 Squadron RAF
- Conflicts: Polish Defensive War, World War II
- Awards: Virtuti Militari; Cross of Valour; Distinguished Flying Cross (UK)

Stanisław Józef Blok DFC (1916-1994) was a Polish fighter ace of the Polish Air Force in World War II with 5 confirmed kills.

== Biography ==
Stanisław Blok was born in 1916. His ancestors came to Gdańsk from Flanders. On 3 January 1939, he entered the Polish Air Force Academy in Dęblin where he trained on PWS-10 and PZL P.7.

After the September Campaign, he was evacuated to the UK via Romania. After training he was assigned to the No. 315 Polish Fighter Squadron in 1941. On 19 August 1941, Blok scored his first victory on a Bf 109 near Dunkirk. On 21 September over Fruges, he shot down a Bf 109 and damaged another one. In the same year, he was promoted podporucznik (pilot officer). He served briefly with No. 603 Squadron RAF in early 1942, moving onto No. 54 Squadron RAF in April of that year. He returned to No. 315 in December 1942.

During World War II, Stanisław Blok downed five aircraft and one flying bomb V-1.

== Awards ==
Virtuti Militari, Silver Cross
Cross of Valour (Poland), three times
Distinguished Flying Cross (United Kingdom)
