= Jan Kowalski =

Jan Kowalski is a Polish-language term for "Average Joe". It is also a plausible name, and notable people with this name include:

- Maria Michał Kowalski (1871–1942), Polish Roman Catholic priest and schismatic religious leader
- Jan Kowalski (footballer) (born 1937), Polish football midfielder and manager
- Tadeusz Jan Kowalski (1889–1948), Polish orientalist, expert on Middle East Muslim culture and languages
- Jan Kowalski (pilot) (1916–2000), Polish World War II pilot
- Stefan Jan Kowalski (born 1945), Polish professor of technical sciences, chemical engineer and mechanic engineer
