= Bolesław Własnowolski =

- Born: 29 November 1916; Kraków, Austria-Hungary
- Died: 1 November 1940 (aged 23); Chichester, United Kingdom
- Military career
- Allegiance: Poland; United Kingdom
- Branch: Polish Air Force; Royal Air Force
- Rank: porucznik (Polish Air Force); pilot officer (RAF)
- Nickname: Vodka (RAF nickname)
- Service number: P.76736 (RAF)
- Units: No. 32 Squadron RAF; No. 607 Squadron RAF; No. 213 Squadron RAF
- Conflicts: September Campaign; Battle of Britain

Bolesław Andrzej Własnowolski, VM, KW, (29 November 1916 – 1 November 1940) was a Polish fighter ace in the Second World War. He fought in the September Campaign and the Battle of Britain. Własnowolski is credited with four individual and one shared victories. He was killed when a German Messerschmitt Bf 109 aircraft shot down his Hawker Hurricane over southern England.

== Life ==
Własnowolski was born on 29 November 1916 in Kraków, which was then part of the Austro-Hungarian Empire. His father, Władysław Własnowolski, was a railway clerk.

Własnowolski joined the Polish Air Force in October 1936 and started training to be a fighter pilot in October 1937. In June 1939 he was posted to 122 Squadron, which flew PZL P.11c fighter aircraft and was part of the III/1 Dywizjon Myśliwski.

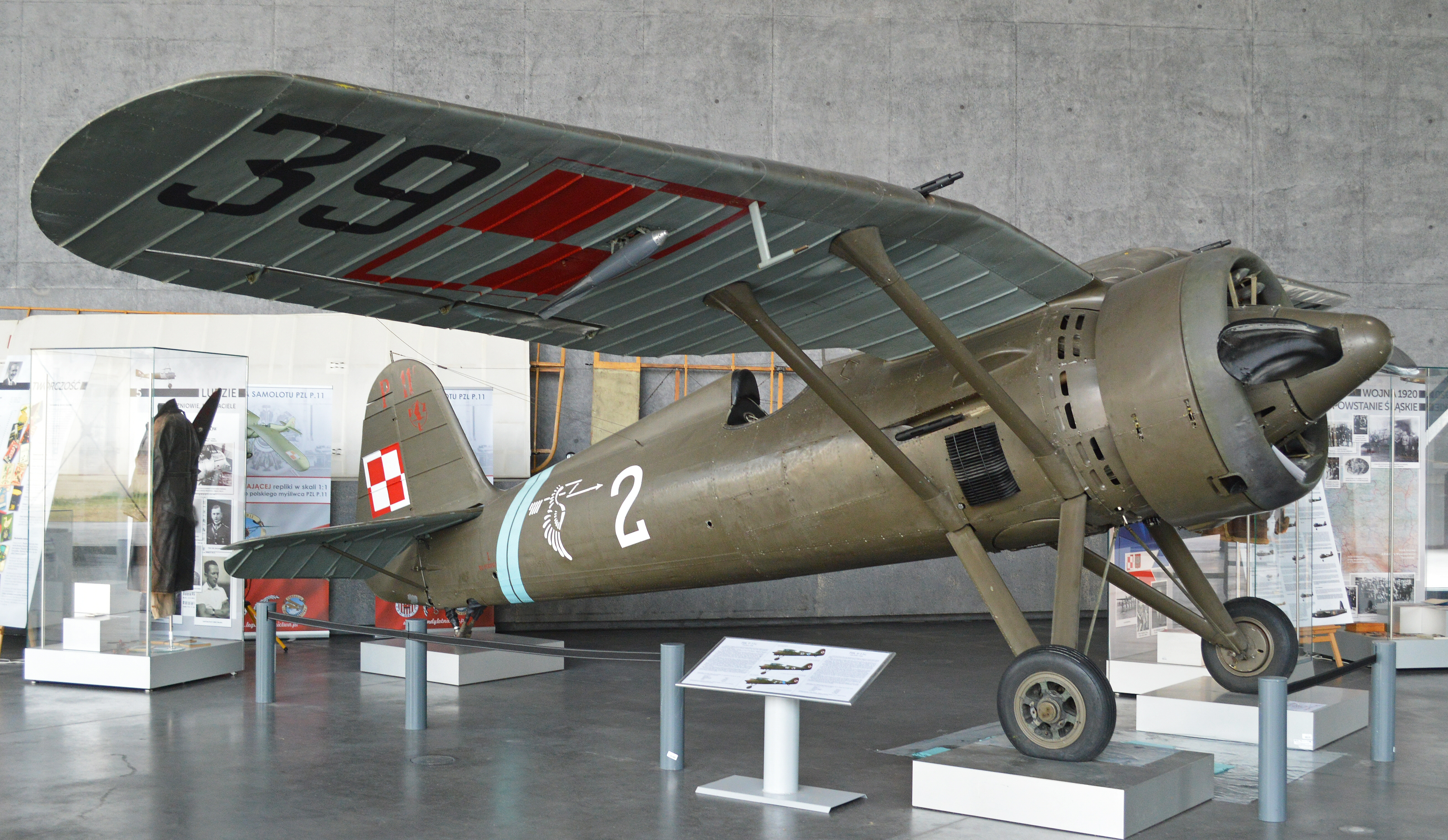
A PZL P.11c fighter in the Polish Aviation Museum at Kraków

In the September Campaign in 1939, 122 Squadron was transferred to an airfield at Balice, west of Kraków. On 2 September, Własnowolski shared the shooting down of a Dornier Do 17 bomber. After the USSR invaded Poland on 17 September, III/1 Division evacuated to Romania.

On 15 October 1939 a large group of Polish airmen including Własnowolski left Romania by ship from the Black Sea port of Balchik. They reached Beirut in French-ruled Lebanon, where they joined a French ship that reached Marseille on 29 October. In France, Własnowolski was initially posted to Salon-de-Provence Air Base.

Late in 1939 Własnowolski left France for England to transfer to the Royal Air Force Volunteer Reserve. He trained at RAF Eastchurch in Kent and RAF Sutton Bridge in Lincolnshire.

On 8 August 1940 Własnowolski joined No. 32 Squadron RAF, which flew Hawker Hurricanes from RAF Biggin Hill in Kent. On 13 September he was transferred to No. 607 Squadron, which flew Hurricanes from RAF Tangmere in West Sussex. In the Battle of Britain he claimed a Messerschmitt Bf 109 on 15 August, and a Do 17 shared (of KG 76) and a Bf 109 (of JG 26) on 18 August. He claimed another Do 17 on 15 September.

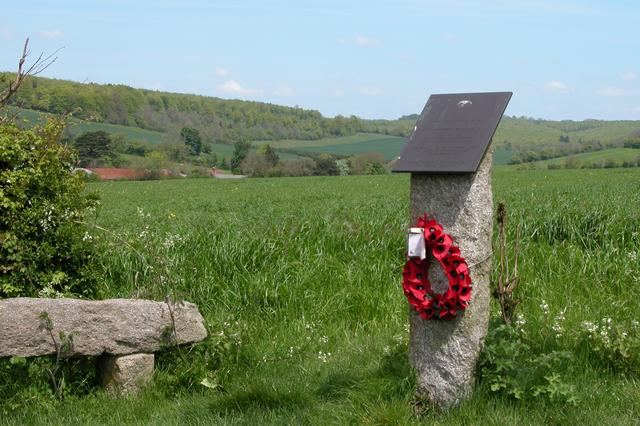
Monument to Bolesław Własnowolski near Stoughton

On 17 September, Własnowolski was transferred to No. 213 Squadron, which also flew Hurricanes from Tangmere. On 1 November 1940 a Bf 109 of I/JG 2 shot him down over the village of Stoughton, West Sussex. He crashed fatally on a farm near the village.

== Grave and monument ==
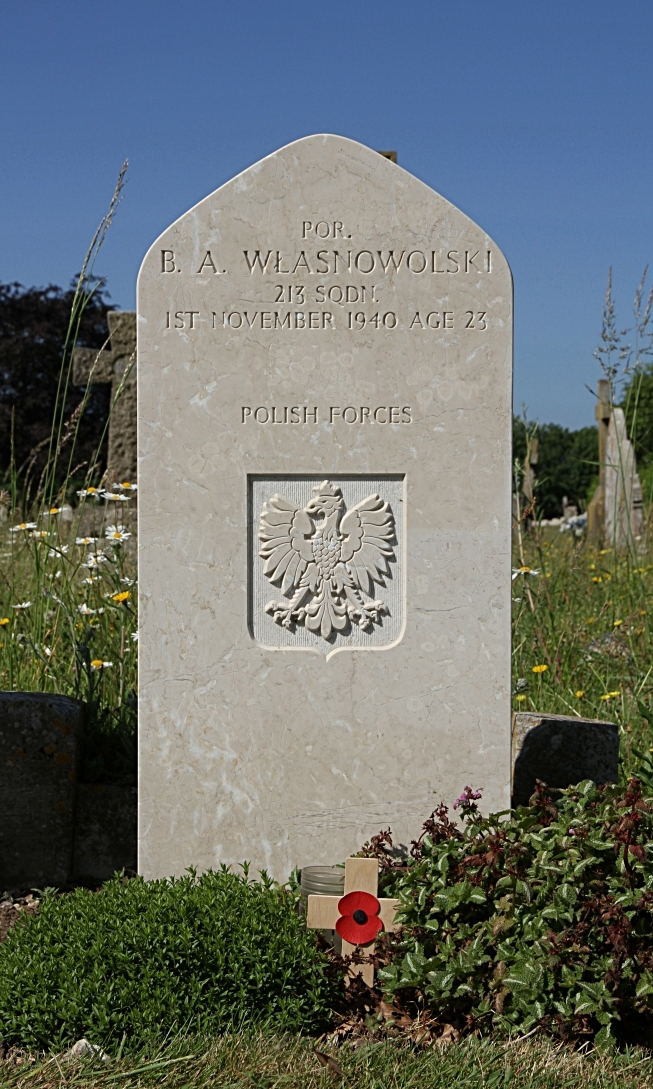
Własnowolski's grave in Chichester Cemetery

Własnowolski is buried in the CWGC Roman Catholic section of the main cemetery in Chichester, England. On 1 February 1941 the Polish government-in-exile posthumously awarded him the Virtuti Militari, 5th Class. On 31 October 1947 he was posthumously awarded the Cross of Valour (Krzyż Walecznych).

There is a monument to Własnowolski beside the path to Kingley Vale from Stoughton, beside the field where his Hurricane crashed.
