= Karol Pniak =

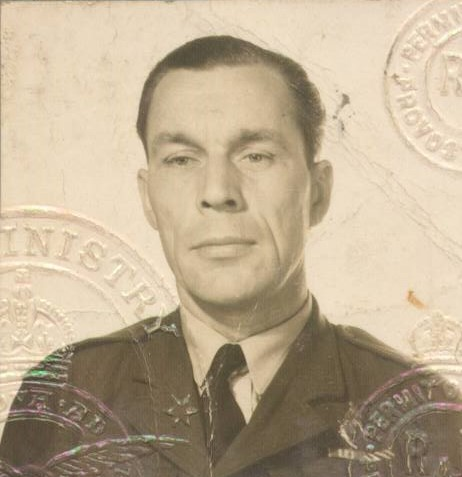
- Born: 26 January 1910; Jaworzno, Poland
- Died: 10 November 1980 (aged 70); Kraków, Poland
- Military career
- Allegiance: Poland; United Kingdom
- Branch: Polish Air Force; Royal Air Force
- Nickname: Cognac (RAF nickname)
- Service number: 76707
- Unit: No. 32 Squadron RAF; No. 308 Polish Fighter Squadron
- Commands: No. 308 Polish Fighter Squadron (29 November 1944 – 30 June 1945)
- Conflicts: Second World War

Karol Pniak (26 January 1910 – 10 November 1980) was a Polish World War II flying ace of the Battle of Britain. Originally a pilot for the Polish Air Force in the September Campaign of 1939, he later flew with No. 32 Squadron of the Royal Air Force, during the Battle of Britain, where he was known by the nickname "Cognac." Karol Pniak claimed five victories in the Battle.

Pilot Officer Pniak then served with 257 Squadron, and was involved in the dogfight with Regia Aeronautica aircraft on 11 November 1940. He attacked one Fiat BR.20M bomber that began to smoke and burn and then turned onto its back before it dived into the North Sea 10 miles east of Harwich after one man had baled out. He then attacked another, which glided in towards the coast, trailing smoke.

Pniak then transferred to 306 Squadron, serving from November 1940 to November 1941. Two months at the Air Fighting Development Unit followed, before a return to 306 until January 1943.

Pniak then served for five months in North Africa with the Polish Fighting Team. From September 1943 to November 1944 he was an instructor at No. 6 Operational Training Unit. From 29 November 1944 until 30 June 1945 he commanded No. 308 "Cracow" Squadron

After the war he was assigned to Headquarters, Polish Air Force in July 1945 and the Polish No. 131 Wing in November 1945. In August 1946 he returned to 308 Squadron as a supernumerary commander, receiving a Bar to his Polish Cross of Valour and Dutch Airman's Cross.

Pniak's final tally was 7 aircraft claimed destroyed, 2 shared destroyed, 2 "probables", 1 damaged, with 2 shared damaged.

He left active service in 1947 and returned to Poland, where he died in Kraków in 1980.
