= Mieczysław Mümler =

Polish air force fighter ace

- Born: 10 December 1899; Lwów
- Died: 5 September 1985 (aged 85); London
- Military career
- Allegiance: Poland; France; United Kingdom
- Branch: Polish Air Force; France Armée de l'Air; Royal Air Force
- Service years: 1918-1946
- Rank: Group Captain
- Service number: P-1288
- Units: III/3 Fighter Squadron; Groupe de Chasse II/7; No. 302 Polish Fighter Squadron
- Commands: III/3 Fighter Squadron
- Conflicts: World War II
- Awards: Virtuti Militari; Croix de Guerre

Mieczysław Mümler (10 December 1899 – 5 September 1985) was a Polish fighter ace of the Polish Air Force in World War II with 5 confirmed kills and one shared.

== Biography ==
Mieczysław Mümler was born in Lwów in 1899. In November 1918 he fought as one of Lwów Eaglets and was wounded in combat. In February 1919 he was assigned to a Legions Field Artillery Regiment. He took part in the Greater Poland Uprising (1918–19). Three years later he was graduated from the Cadets Artillery School and was commissioned as a 2nd lieutenant.

In 1926 he applied for a transfer to the Air Force which was accepted. He completed pilot training in a Fighter Regiment in Lida. In 1929 he took command of a fighter escadrille in Poznań. He was an instructor in the High Aviation School in Grudziądz.

During the September Campaign Mümler commanded the III/3 Fighter Squadron, on 6 September he shot down his first enemy plane, a He 111, six days later he shot down another Heinkel and a Hs 126. He was evacuated to France via Romania. In the Battle of France he flew a Dewoitine D.520, on 1 June he shot down a He 111 and on 15 June he scored a shared victory on a Do 17.

Upon the fall of France he flew across the Mediterranean to North Africa, and then via Casablanca and Gibraltar reached Britain. He received service no. P-1288. He was appointed to organise and command No. 302 Polish Fighter Squadron, with which he took part in the Battle of Britain. On 18 September 1940 he shot down a Do 215. In February 1941 he became commander of the 58 Operational Training Unit then of the 55 OTU. In September 1942 he was given command of the Polish Station in Northolt. He occasionally flew on operations with the wing (on 3 February 1943 he damaged a Fw 190).

Mieczysław Mümler was demobilized in 1946. He settled in London where he worked as a baker. He died on 5 September 1985.

== Aerial victory credits ==
- He 111 - 6 September 1939
- He 111 - 12 September 1939
- Hs 126 - 12 September 1939
- ^{1}/_{2} He 111 - Battle of France (damaged)
- He 111 - 1 June 1940
- ^{1}/_{2} Do 17 – 15 June 1940
- Do 215 (Do 17) - 18 September 1940
- Fw 190 - 3 February 1943 (damaged)

== Awards ==
Virtuti Militari, Silver Cross
Croix de Guerre
