= Aleksander Gabszewicz =

World War 2 polish pilot

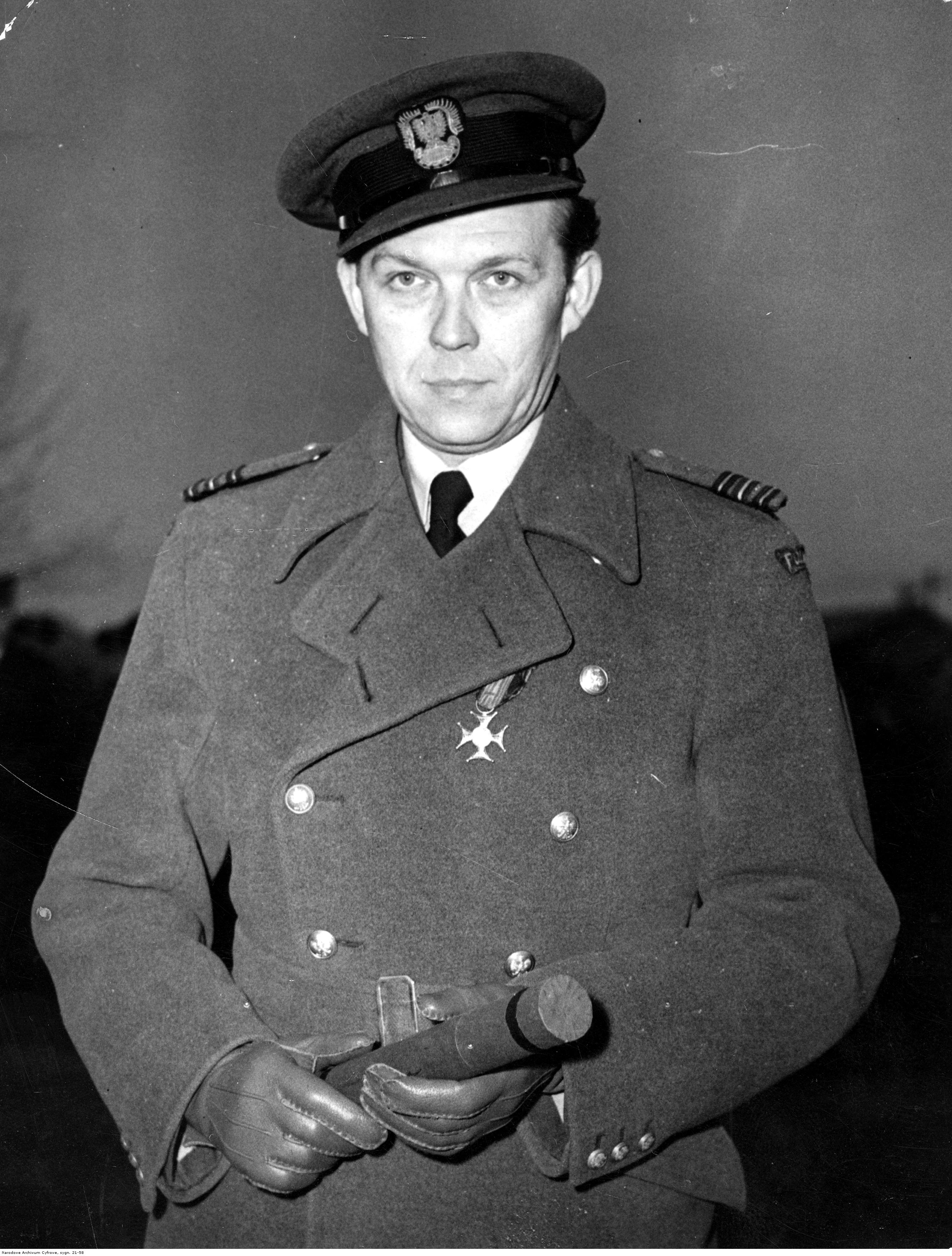
- Born: 6 December 1911; Šiauliai, Russian Empire (now Lithuania)
- Died: 10 October 1983 (aged 71); Malvern, Worcestershire, England
- Military career
- Branch: Polish Land Forces; Royal Air Force
- Rank: Generał brygady
- Service number: P-0163
- Units: Border Defence Corps; No. 607 Squadron RAF; No. 303 Polish Fighter Squadron
- Commands: No. 316 Polish Fighter Squadron; 2nd Polish Wing; 1st Polish Wing; 56th USAAF Fighter Group
- Conflicts: Second World War

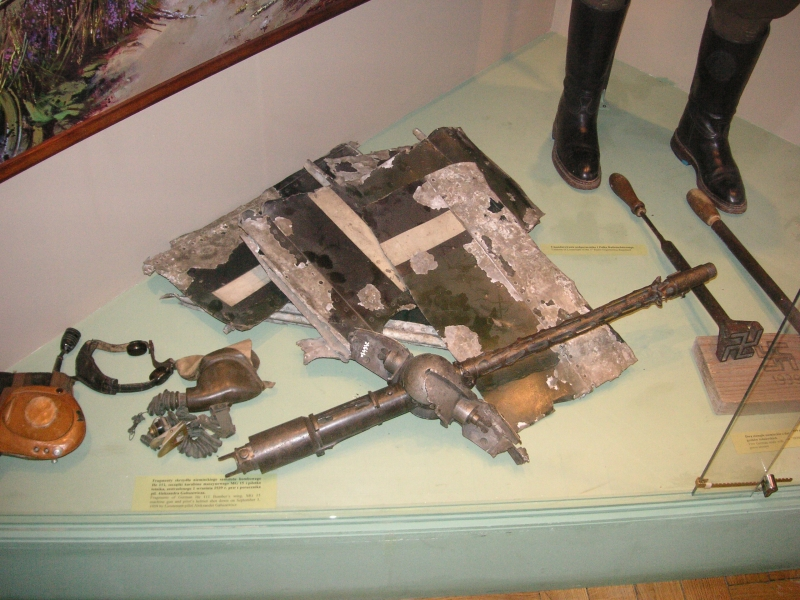
German MG 15 aerial machine gun, pilot's cap and some debris of a German Heinkel He 111 downed by Aleksander Gabszewicz on 1 September 1939

Aleksander Klemens Gabszewicz (6 December 1911 – 10 October 1983) was a Polish fighter pilot and a World War II fighter ace, with a score of 9½ confirmed and 2 probable kills.

== Biography ==
Born in Šiauliai, then in the Russian Empire (now Lithuania), in 1931 he joined the Polish Army. Initially serving as an infantry NCO, in 1938, he graduated from the Dęblin-based Eagles' School and was attached to the air wing of the Border Defence Corps. Just before World War II he was a tactical officer of the IV/1 Fighter Group.

After the outbreak of the Polish September Campaign on 1 September 1939, around 9 AM, he scored his first kill, a Heinkel He 111 of 5.(K)/LG 1 unit over Ciechanów. According to some authors, it was the first kill of a German plane in World War II.

Downed the same day, he made it to France where he became the commanding officer of the 5th key of Groupe de Chasse III/10 covering Besançon. There, while piloting a Bloch 151, he downed a Dornier Do 17.

After the capitulation, he made it to the United Kingdom, where he served in the ranks of No. 607 Squadron RAF and No. 303 Polish Fighter Squadron. In December 1940 he was posted as a flight commander in No. 316 Polish Fighter Squadron. He became the commanding officer in November 1941. He was posted to 11 Group HQ in June 1942, and then as an instructor to 58 OTU until June 1943. He was then made wing commander/flying of the 2nd Polish Wing and finally the 1st Polish Wing. He was also attached to the 56th USAAF Fighter Group in December 1943, and then commanded 131 Wing RAF in February 1944, leading the wing during the invasion of Normandy. He became the commanding officer of RAF Coltishall in February 1945.

He ended the war in the Polish rank of generał brygady and remained in exile in the United Kingdom. He died in Malvern in 1983. His ashes were brought to Poland in 1992 and dispersed over Warsaw and Dęblin.

== Legacy ==
The Battle of Britain Memorial Flight's Spitfire TE311 is painted to represent the aircraft flown by Gabszewicz in Germany from April to June 1945.

== Decorations ==
Distinguished Service Order (with Bar)
Distinguished Flying Cross
Croix de Guerre (France)
Virtuti Militari (Golden Cross)
Virtuti Militari (Silver Cross)
Commander's Cross with Star of the Order of Polonia Restituta
Cross of Valour, four times
