= No. 317 Polish Fighter Squadron =

No. 317 "City of Wilno" Polish Fighter Squadron
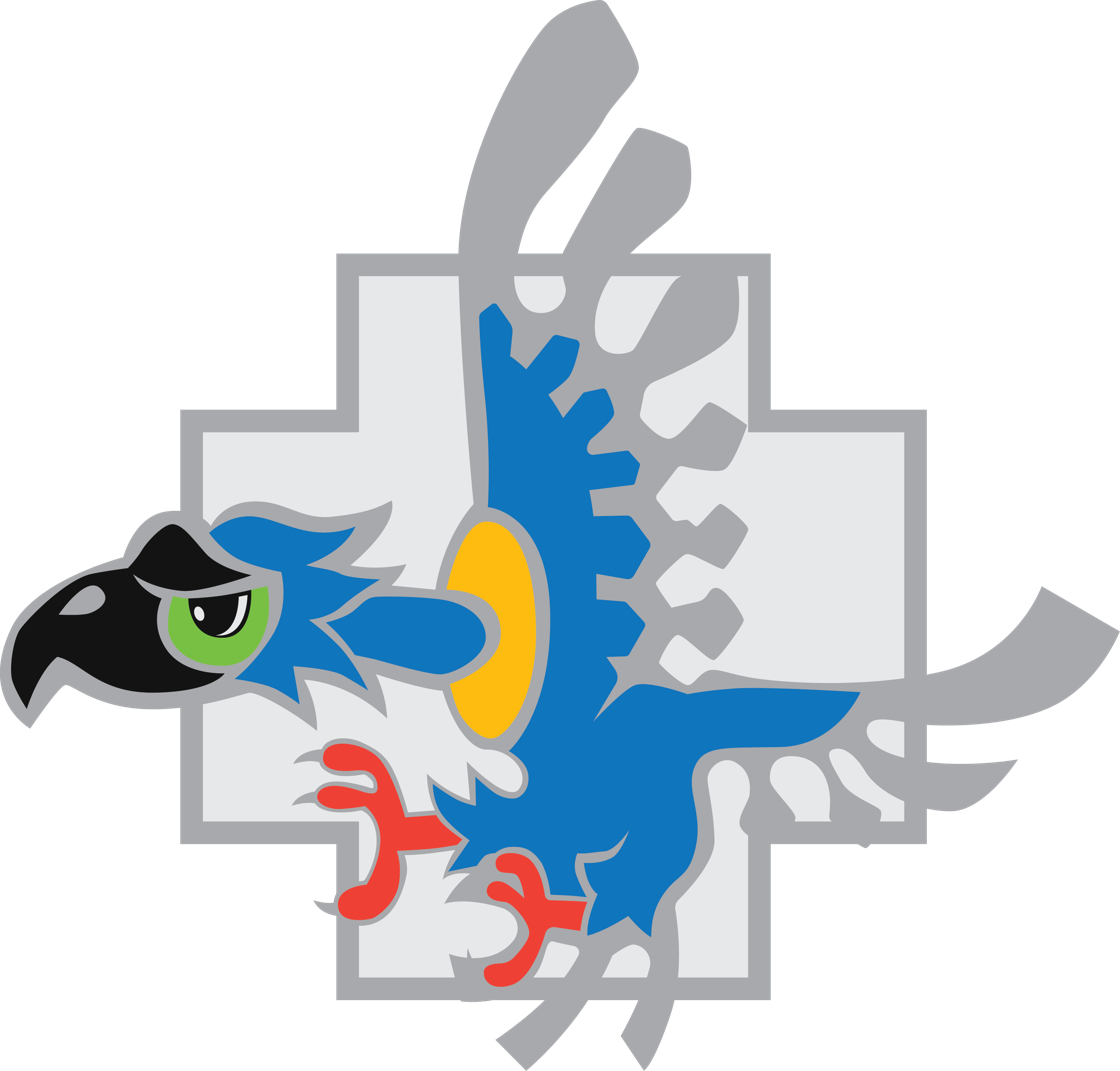
- 317 Squadron logo. Digital vector rendering made from a breast lapel pin.
- Active: 22 February 1941 – 18 December 1946
- Country: United Kingdom
- Allegiance: (Poland) Polish government in exile
- Branch: Royal Air Force
- Role: Fighter Squadron
- Part of: RAF Fighter Command
- Nickname(s): Wilno "Wileński" (of Wilno)

Commanders
- Notable commanders: Stanisław Skalski; Władysław Gnyś

Insignia
- Squadron Codes: JH (February 1941 – December 1946)

No. 317 "City of Wilno" Polish Fighter Squadron (Polish: 317 Dywizjon Myśliwski „Wileński") was a Polish fighter squadron formed in Great Britain as part of an agreement between the Polish Government in Exile and the United Kingdom in 1941. It was one of 15 squadrons of the Polish Air Force in exile that served alongside the Royal Air Force in World War II.

== History ==
The squadron was formed at RAF Acklington on 22 February 1941 and reached operational readiness on 24 April 1941. It was equipped with Hurricane Mk.Is until July when it received Mk.IIs. The squadron moved south in June and received Spitfires in October. As with most Fighter Command squadrons it alternated its operations between offensive sweeps from bases in the south and defensive duties whilst based in the North and Midlands.

In June 1943 the squadron was allocated to the 2nd Tactical Air Force and moved to RAF Heston. During the buildup to the invasion of Normandy the squadron carried out offensive sweeps in preparation for the landings. After the invasion they conducted ground attack operations in support of Allied ground forces, moving to the continent in August. The squadron arrived in Belgium in October 1944 and Germany in April 1945, remaining there as part of the occupation forces until disbanding as a Polish fighter unit on 3 January 1947 (it had earlier disbanded as a RAF fighter unit at RAF Hethel on 18 December 1946).

== Commanding officers ==
From	To	Name	Remark
Mar 1941	Apr 1941	S/Ldr C.J. Mount	British Officer
Apr 1941	Jun 1941	S/Ldr A.N. Cole	British Officer
Jun 1941	Aug 1941	Maj. Stanisław Brzezina	Polish co-commander since formation
Aug 1941	Mar 1942	Kpt. Henryk Szczęsny, KW, VM	
Mar 1942	May 1942	Kpt. Piotr Ozyra	
May 1942	Nov 1942	Kpt. Stanisław Skalski	
Nov 1942	May 1943	Kpt. Zbigniew Czajkowski	
May 1943	Dec 1943	Kpt. Franciszek Kornicki	
Dec 1943	Jan 1944	Kpt. Rutkowski	
Jan 1944	Aug 1944	Kpt. Włodzimierz Miksa	
Aug 1944	Aug 1944	Kpt. Władysław Gnyś	
Aug 1944	May 1945	Kpt. Marian Chełmecki	
May 1945	Oct 1945	Kpt. Paweł Niemiec	
Oct 1945	Dec 1946	Kpt. Marian Trzebiński	

== Aircraft operated ==
From	To	Aircraft	Version
Feb 1941	Jul 1941	Hawker Hurricane	Mk.I
Jul 1941	Oct 1941	Hawker Hurricane	Mks.IIa, IIb
Oct 1941	Sep 1943	Supermarine Spitfire	Mks.Vb, Vc
Sep 1943	May 1945	Supermarine Spitfire	Mk.IXe, LF.IXe
May 1945	Dec 1946	Supermarine Spitfire	Mk.XVI
