= Distinguished Flying Medal =

British military decoration

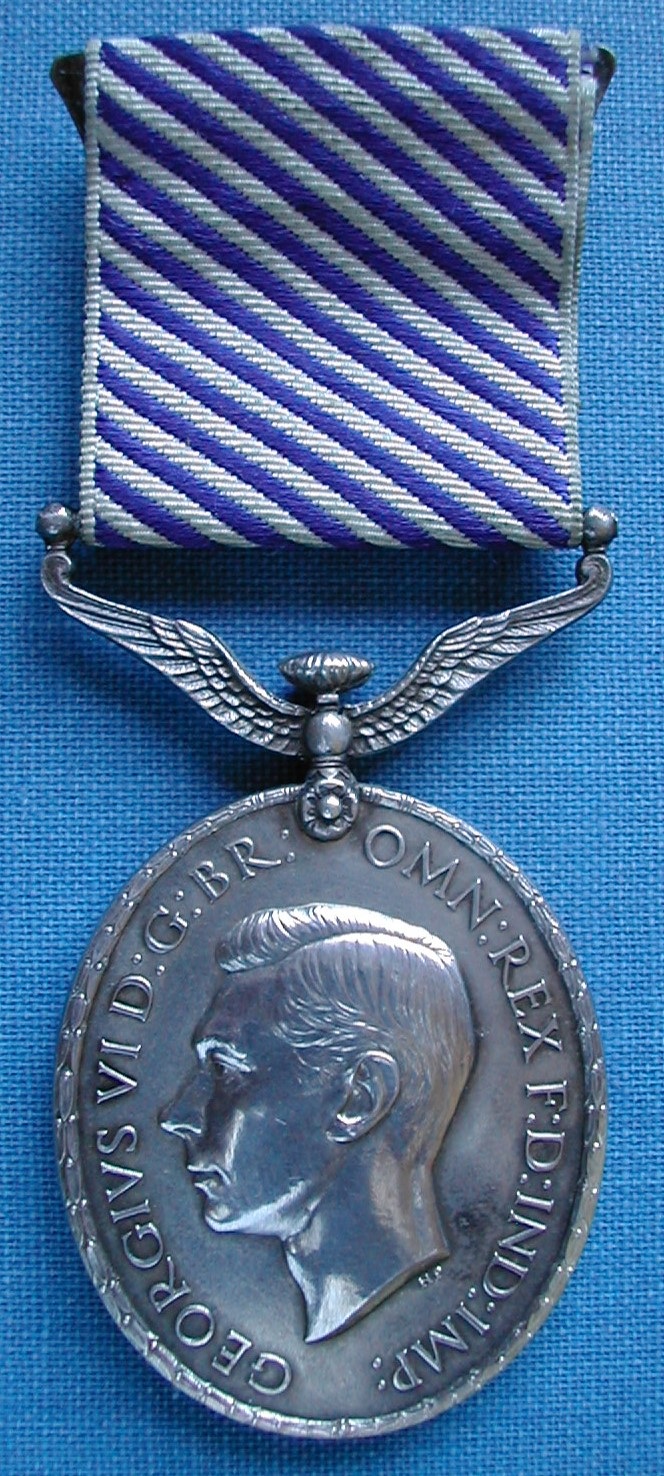
- Obverse of the medal
- Type: Military decoration.
- Awarded for: Exceptional valour, courage or devotion to duty whilst flying in active operations against the enemy
- Presented by: UK and Commonwealth
- Eligibility: British and (formerly) Commonwealth forces
- Status: Discontinued in 1993
- Established: 3 June 1918
- First award: 1918
- Final award: 1993
- Ribbon bar

Order of Wear
- Next (higher): Military Medal
- Next (lower): Air Force Medal
- Related: Distinguished Flying Cross

The Distinguished Flying Medal (DFM) was a military decoration awarded to personnel of the Royal Air Force and other British Armed Forces, and formerly to personnel of other Commonwealth countries, below commissioned rank, for "exceptional valour, courage or devotion to duty whilst flying in active operations against the enemy". The award was discontinued in 1993 when all ranks became eligible for the Distinguished Flying Cross (DFC) as part of the reform of the British honours system.

== History ==
The medal was established on 3 June 1918. It was the other ranks' equivalent to the Distinguished Flying Cross, which was awarded to commissioned officers and Warrant Officers, although the latter could also be awarded the DFM. The decoration ranked below the DFC in order of precedence, between the Military Medal and the Air Force Medal. Recipients of the Distinguished Flying Medal are entitled to use the post-nominal letters "DFM".

Although announced in the London Gazette on 3 June 1918, the actual royal warrants were not published in the London Gazette until 5 December 1919.

In 1979 eligibility for a number of British awards, including the DFM, was extended to permit posthumous awards. Until that time, only the Victoria Cross and a mention in dispatches could be awarded posthumously.

In 1993, the DFM was discontinued, as part of the review of the British honours system, which recommended removing distinctions of rank in respect of awards for bravery. Since then, the Distinguished Flying Cross, previously only open to Commissioned and Warrant Officers, can be awarded to personnel of all ranks.

The DFM had also been awarded by Commonwealth countries but by the 1990s most, including Canada, Australia and New Zealand, had established their own honours systems and no longer recommended British honours.

== Awards ==
There were two categories of award, either "Immediate" or "Non-Immediate".

Immediate

An "Immediate" award was one which was recommended by a senior officer, usually in respect of an act or acts of bravery or devotion to duty deemed to command immediate recognition. In such circumstances, the recommendation for the award was passed as quickly as possible through the laid down channels to obtain approval by the AOC-in-C of the appropriate Command to whom, from 1939, the power to grant immediate awards was designated by King George VI.

An example of an "Immediate" award is that to Leslie Marsh, which was published in the London Gazette on 15 February 1944.

- 1482444 Sergeant Leslie MARSH, Royal Air Force Volunteer Reserve, No. 103 Squadron. "This airman was the mid-upper gunner of an aircraft detailed to attack Mannheim one night in September, 1943. When nearing the target area the aircraft was hit by machine gun fire from a fighter. The rear gunner was killed and Sergeant Marsh was wounded in the legs. Although in great pain Sergeant Marsh remained at his post. Coolly withholding his fire until the attacker came into close range he then delivered an accurate burst which caused the enemy aircraft to break away; later it was seen to be on fire. On two occasions, more recently, his cool and determined work has played a good part in the success of the sortie. Sergeant Marsh is a model of efficiency and his example of courage and resolution has earned great praise."

Non-immediate

"Non-Immediate" awards were made by the monarch on the recommendation of the Air Ministry and were to reward devotion to duty sustained over a period of time. This category of award could be made at any time during an operational tour but, in a large number of instances, the award was given to recognise the successful completion of a full tour of operational flying.

== Numbers of awards ==
Between 1918 and 1993 a total of 6,967 medals, 64 second award bars and one third award bar were awarded. Over 95% of these awards were for service during the Second World War.

During the First World War, 104 Distinguished Flying Medals and two second award bars were awarded to British and Commonwealth servicemen, with a further four honorary awards to foreign combatants, three Belgians and one French airman.

The first awards of the medal appeared in the London Gazette of 3 June 1918, where two recipients are listed.

- F/9689 Acting Air Mechanic W./T. Albert Edward Clark (of Woodford).
- 113763 Serjeant John Charles Hagan (of Ulverston)

The first award of a bar to the Distinguished Flying Medal was announced in the London Gazette on 3 December 1918. It was awarded to Sergeant observer Arthur Newland, DFM who had been awarded the DFM on 21 September 1918.

In the period between the World Wars, 41 awards of the DFM were made between 1920 and 1929 and a further 39 between 1930 and 1939, along with two second award bars.

During the Second World War, a total of 6,637 DFMs were awarded, with 60 second award bars. A unique second bar, representing a third award, was awarded to Flight Sergeant Donald Ernest Kingaby on 7 November 1941.

At least 170 Honorary DFM's and 2 Honorary bars (one of them to Josef Frantisek) were awarded to aircrew from non-Commonwealth countries. 39 were awarded to servicemen of the US, 66 Polish plus one bar, 33 French, 14 Czechoslovak plus one bar, 7 Dutch, 6 Norwegian, 4 Russian and one Belgian.

142 DFMs were earned between 1946 and 1993 when the award was discontinued.

== Description ==
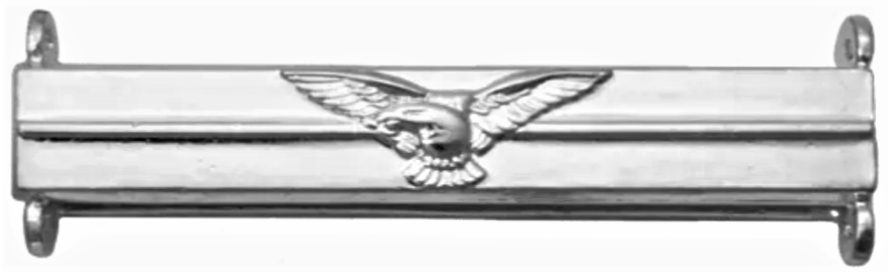
Ribbon bar for a 2nd award

The DFM is an oval silver medal, 35 mm wide and with a height of 41 mm, with the following design:

- The obverse shows the effigy and titles of the reigning sovereign. There are five distinct versions:

- King George V bare headed (1918-29)
- King George V in crown and robes (1930–1937)
- King George VI with 'IND: IMP:' (Indian Emperor) in the inscription (1938–1949)
- King George VI without 'IND: IMP:' in the inscription (1949–1953)
- Queen Elizabeth II (1953–1993)
The three most common obverse designs were:

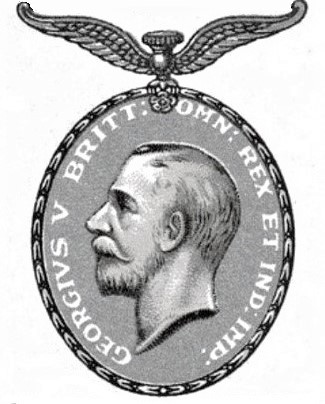
George V 1918-30

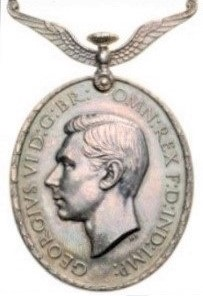
George VI 1938-49

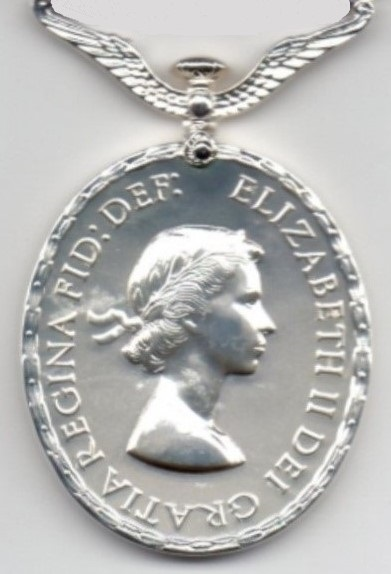
Elizabeth II 1953-93
- The reverse shows Athena Nike seated on an aeroplane, a hawk rising from her right arm above the words 'FOR COURAGE', all within a narrow laurel wreath band. From 1938, when the George VI obverse was introduced, the date '1918' was added to the reverse design.
- The suspension consists of two outstretched wings.
- The ribbon is 32 mm wide, and consists of alternate violet and white stripes (1/16-inch wide) leaning 45 degrees to the left. A violet stripe is to appear in the bottom left and upper right corners when viewed on the wearer's chest. Until July 1919, the stripes were horizontal.
- Further awards are signified by a straight slip-on silver bar with an eagle in the centre.
- All awards have the name and service details of the recipient engraved or impressed on the rim.

Distinguished Flying Medal ribbon bars
	DFM	DFM and Bar
1918–1919		
1919–1993		

== See also ==
- Category:Recipients of the Distinguished Flying Medal
- British and Commonwealth orders and decorations

== Bibliography ==
- Abbott and Tamplin (1981). British Gallantry Awards. Nimrod Dix & Co. ISBN 0902633740.
- Duckers, Peter (2001). British Gallantry Awards, 1855–2000. London: Osprey Publishing. ISBN 978-0-7478-0516-8.
- Mussell, John (ed). (2015). Medal Yearbook 2015. Honiton, Devon: Token Publishing. ISBN 978-1-908-828-16-3.
- Tavender, Ian (1990). The Distinguished Flying Medal, a record of courage 1918–82. JB Hayward. ISBN 0903754479.
