= No. 302 Polish Fighter Squadron =

No. 302 (City of Poznan) Polish Fighter Squadron
- Active: 10 July 1940 – 18 December 1946
- Country: United Kingdom
- Allegiance: (Poland) Polish Government in exile
- Branch: Royal Air Force
- Role: Fighter and escort
- Part of: RAF Fighter Command
- Nickname: Poznan; Dywizjon Myśliwski "Poznański"
- Aircraft: Hawker Hurricane; Supermarine Spitfire
- Engagements: Battle of Britain; Operation Jubilee; Bomber escort Battle of Normandy; Crossing the Rhine

Commanders
- Notable commanders: Piotr Łaguna, Wacław Król

Insignia
- Squadron Codes: WX (1940 - Jan 1945); QH (Jan 1945 - Dec 1946)

No. 302 (City of Poznan) Polish Fighter Squadron RAF (Polish: 302 Dywizjon Myśliwski "Poznański") was a Polish fighter squadron formed in the United Kingdom as part of an agreement between the Polish Government in Exile and the United Kingdom in 1940. It was one of several Polish fighter squadrons fighting alongside the Royal Air Force during the Second World War.

== History ==
The squadron inherited the traditions, along with the emblem and a large part of the initial crew, of the pre-war Polish III/3 Fighter Squadron composed of the 131st and 132nd Fighter Escadrilles.

The Squadron was one of the four Polish-cored Royal Air Force squadrons that participated in the Battle of Britain. It consisted mostly of Polish pilots, many of whom were veterans. The backbone of the squadron was formed by 13 pilots who served with the I/145 Polish Fighter Squadron and were evacuated from France during the last stages of the German invasion of France.

The squadron was formed on 10 July 1940, equipped with Hawker Hurricanes the squadron was part of No. 12 Group RAF. As the combat became more fierce, the 302 was moved to RAF Duxford, north of London. The squadron operated from there as part of the Duxford Wing, 12 Group's 'Big Wing' formation, from 14 September through 25 September. Having enjoyed some success on East Coast patrols following the Battle of Britain, No. 302 Squadron re-located to RAF Jurby, Isle of Man, where they commenced night flying training and low level work.

On the 17th May 1943, whilst the squadron was at RAF Hutton Cranswick, there was a change of flight commanders. ‘A’ flight commander Zulikowski was replaced by Witold Łanowski who transferred from 317 sq and ‘B’ flight commander Chełmecki was replaced by Bolesław Gładych. Łanowski and Gładych would both transfer to the USAAF in early 1944 both flying with the famous ‘Zemke’s Wolfpack’, the 56th Fighter Group.

At some point afterwards the squadron operated from RAF Chailey. On 11 June 1944, 302 became the first Polish Squadron to land in France, five days after D-Day. It was fighting as part of No. 131 Polish Fighter Wing when its airfield was attacked by Jagdgeschwader 1 during Operation Bodenplatte in January 1945.

No. 302 Polish Squadron lost 20 pilots killed, 12 missing and 9 taken prisoners, 63 aircraft destroyed and 43 damaged by the enemy's air defence.

It was disbanded on 18 December 1946, at RAF Hethel. A replica Hurricane in 302 squadron markings was the gate guardian at the Imperial War Museum Duxford until it was repainted in 242 squadron markings in February 2018.

No. 302 Polish Squadron is mentioned in the historical novel Leaden Skies (Italian: Cieli di Piombo) by Italian novelist Mathilde Bonetti as the Squadron her main character, a Polish fighter pilot, flies for.

== Commanders ==
- overall general command (British) 13 July 1940 - Squadron Leader William A. J. Satchell
- 1 January 1941 S/Ldr (kpt.) Piotr Łaguna
- 13 July 1940 - S/Ldr (mjr) Mieczysław Mümler
- 7 December 1940 - S/Ldr (kpt.) Piotr Łaguna
- 19 May 1941 - F/Lt (kpt.) (15 June 1941 - Acting S/Ldr) Stefan Witorzeńć
- 28 November 1941 - S/Ldr (kpt.) Julian Kowalski
- 25 August 1942 - S/Ldr (kpt.) Stanisław Łapka
- 16 May 1943 - S/Ldr (kpt.) Wieczysław Barański
- 18 October 1943 - S/Ldr (kpt.) Wacław Król
- 7 July 1944 - S/Ldr (kpt.) Marian Duryasz
- 30 January 1945 - S/Ldr (kpt.) Zygmunt Bieńkowski
- 24 February 1945 - S/Ldr (kpt.) Ignacy Olszewski
- 24 March 1945 - S/Ldr (kpt.) Bolesław Kaczmarek
- 1 August 1945 - S/Ldr (kpt.) Jerzy Szymankiewicz (until disbanding)

== Aircraft operated ==
Aircraft
From	To	Aircraft	Version
July 1940	March 1941	Hawker Hurricane	Mk.I
March 1941	May 1941	Hawker Hurricane	Mk.IIa
May 1941	July 1941	Hawker Hurricane	Mk.I
July 1941	October 1941	Hawker Hurricane	Mk.IIb
October 1941	September 1943	Supermarine Spitfire	Mks.Vb, Vc
September 1943	February 1945	Supermarine Spitfire	Mk.IX
February 1945	December 1946	Supermarine Spitfire	Mk.XVI

== See also ==
- List of Royal Air Force aircraft squadrons
- Polish Air Forces in France and Great Britain
- Polish contribution to World War II
