= Polish Air Force University =

University for the Polish Air Force

Coordinates: 51°33′27″N 21°51′35″E

Polish Air Force University in Dęblin
- Motto: Pro Patria Semper (Latin), Always For Fatherland (English)
- Type: Military academy
- Established: 1927
- Commendant: Brig. Gen. Pil. Dr. Krzysztof CUR
- Location: Dęblin, Poland
- Campus: Dęblin AFB
- Nickname: School of Eagles
- Website: https://law.mil.pl
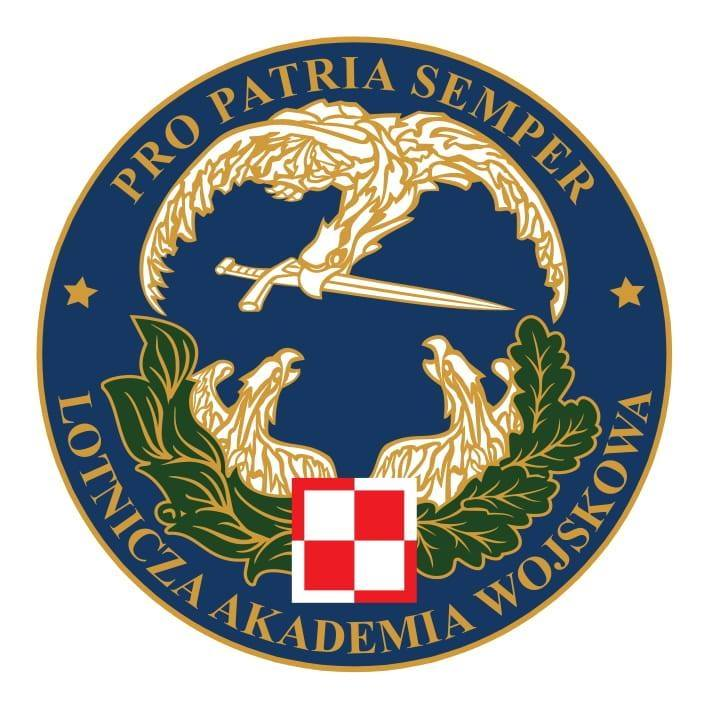

The Polish Air Force Academy (Polish: Wyższa Szkoła Oficerska Sił Powietrznych (1994–2018); Lotnicza Akademia Wojskowa (since 2018)), The School of the Eaglets, is located in Dęblin, eastern Poland. Established in 1927 during the interwar period, the Polish Air Force University is an accredited university for the undergraduate education of officers for the Polish Air Force.
