= Jan Falkowski =

Polish fighter ace

Jan Falkowski DSO DFC**
- Born: 26 June 1912; Pohulanka, Russian Empire
- Died: 27 July 2001 (aged 89); Peterborough, Ontario, Canada
- Military career
- Allegiance: Poland; France; United Kingdom
- Branch: Polish Air Force; France Armée de l'Air; Royal Air Force
- Service years: 1934-1947
- Rank: major
- Service number: P-0493
- Units: Polish 114th Fighter Escadrille; No. 32 Squadron RAF; No. 315 Polish Fighter Squadron; No. 316 Polish Fighter Squadron; No. 303 Polish Fighter Squadron
- Commands: 3rd Polish Fighter Wing
- Conflicts: Polish Defensive War, World War II
- Awards: Virtuti Militari; Polonia Restituta; Cross of Valour; Distinguished Flying Cross (UK)

Jan Paweł Falkowski DFC** (26 June 1912 – 27 July 2001) was a Polish fighter ace of the Polish Air Force in World War II with 9 confirmed kills.

== Biography ==
Falkowski was born in Pohulanka near Vilnius in 1912. In 1934 he entered to Polish Air Force Academy in Dęblin. He was promoted first lieutenant (podporucznik) in October 1936. Then he began his career in Toruń. In 1938 he was sent to Dęblin as instructor. During the Invasion of Poland, on 3 September 1939, he flew a PWS-26, three German planes attacked him. Falkowski reduced the flight almost to the ground and using aircraft maneuverability caused that one German fighter crashed into the ground, and the other interrupted the attack and turned back, most likely due to the small amount of fuel.

After the Soviet invasion of Poland he crossed the border with Romania, then he came to France where he became instructor at Polish School in Lyon–Bron Airport. On 31 May 1940 he took command of section no. 10. When France capitulated, he arrived in the United Kingdom on 27 June 1940. He was assigned to No. 32 Squadron RAF. He shot down his first plane on 16 January 1941. During the battle, his plane was badly damaged, Falkowski had to jump with a parachute and broke his leg on landing. After treatment he was sent to the No. 315 Polish Fighter Squadron. In August 1941 he downed three Bf 109 over France. In September he scored two victories. On 22 September he became commander of "A" Flight. He also served in No. 316 Polish Fighter Squadron and No. 303 Polish Fighter Squadron. On 30 January 1945 he was named commander of the 3rd Polish Fighter Wing. During one flight over the Netherlands, on 9 March 1945, he was hit by flak, due to the failure of the aircraft, Falkowski had to save himself by jumping with a parachute once again. He was fired upon by the Germans. One of the bullets wounded him in the leg. He was taken POW. On 9 May 1945 he came back to England.

After the demobilization in 1947, he settled in Canada and had a farm 20 miles away from Toronto. In the 1960s he wrote an autobiographic book, Z wiatrem w twarz (With the wind in my face), edited in Poland in 1990.

Jan Falkowski died on 27 July 2001 in Peterborough, Canada.

== Awards ==
Virtuti Militari, Silver Cross
Cross of Valour (Poland), four times
Distinguished Flying Cross (United Kingdom)

== Bibliography ==
- Bartłomiej Belcarz: Grupa Myśliwska Montpellier 1940. Sandomierz: Wydawnictwo Stratus, 2012 ISBN 9788361421658
- Tadeusz Jerzy Krzystek, Anna Krzystek: Polskie Siły Powietrzne w Wielkiej Brytanii w latach 1940-1947 łącznie z Pomocniczą Lotniczą Służbą Kobiet (PLSK-WAAF). Sandomierz: Stratus, 2012, p. 174. ISBN 9788361421597
- Jerzy Pawlak: Absolwenci Szkoły Orląt: 1925-1939. Warszawa: Retro-Art, 2009, p. 153. ISBN 8387992224
- Piotr Sikora: Asy polskiego lotnictwa. Warszawa: Oficyna Wydawnicza Alma-Press. 2014, pp. 223–228. ISBN 9788370205607
- Józef Zieliński: Asy polskiego lotnictwa. Warszawa: Agencja lotnicza ALTAIR, 1994, p. 27.
- Józef Zieliński: Lotnicy polscy w Bitwie o Wielką Brytanię. Warszawa: Oficyna Wydawnicza MH, 2005, pp. 44–45. ISBN 8390662043
