= 3rd Polish Fighter Wing =

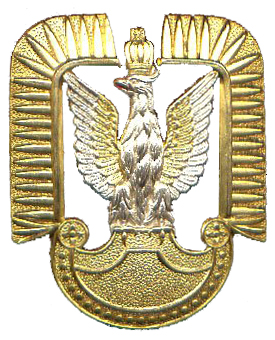
- Eagle of the Polish Air Force
- Active: 1943–1946
- Disbanded: December 1946
- Countries: Poland, United Kingdom
- Allegiance: Royal Air Force
- Branch: Air force
- Engagements: Western Front (World War II)

The 3rd Polish Fighter Wing (Polish: 3 Polskie Skrzydło Myśliwskie) was a mainly Polish formation of the Royal Air Force during the Second World War, that flew Supermarine Spitfires. It was part of the Polish Air Forces in France and Great Britain.

It was formed in June 1943, as the 2nd Polish Fighter Wing, from two Polish squadrons, the No. 302 Polish Fighter Squadron and No. 317 Polish Fighter Squadron. In September it was merged into the 1st Polish Fighter Wing (which was soon thereafter renamed the 131 Wing). It was reorganized in February 1944.

Initially, it protected the central part of England also patrolling coastal waters and securing sea convoys.

Its composition would not be stable, as Polish Squadrons were frequently exchanged between three Polish wings (the No. 131 Wing RAF (1st Polish) wing, the No. 133 Wing RAF (2nd Polish) wing, and the 3rd Polish Fighter Wing).

At various times, this wing included other Polish squadrons, such as the No. 303 Squadron RAF and No. 316 Polish Fighter Squadron. The number of wings was also not constant, as it varied from at one to two.

== The composition after reforming ==
- 15 July 1944: 316
- August 1944: Divisions 303 and 316
- 24 October 1944: Divisions 303 and 315
- 16 January 1945: Division 303
- 16 May 1945: Divisions 303 and 316 (to solve)

== Generals ==
- capt. pil. Walerian Żak (29 VI – 4 X 1943)
- maj. pil. Jan Zumbach (5 X 1943 – 14 VI 1944)
- capt. pil. Tadeusz Sawicz (15 VI – 10 X 1944)
- maj. pil. Kazimierz Rutkowski (11 X 1944 – 30 I 1945)
- maj. pil. Jan Falkowski (31 I – 9 III 1945)
- maj. pil. Wacław Król (10 III – 17 VII 1945)

== Bibliography ==
- Izydor Koliński: Regular units of the Polish Army (aviation). Formation, combat operations, organization and armament, records of air units. A short historical guide about the Polish Army during World War II. Vol. 9. Warsaw: Publishing House of the Ministry of National Defense, 1978.
- Wacław Król: Polskie dywizjony lotnicze w Wielkiej Brytanii 1940-1945. Warsaw: Publishing House of the Ministry of National Defense, 1982.
- Wacław Król: Walczyłem pod niebem Europy i Afryki, Warsaw: People's Publishing Cooperative, 1991. ISBN 83-205-4344-4, OCLC 830063243.
