= Wacław Król =

Polish flying ace

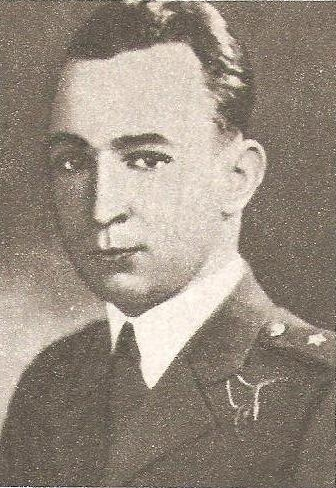
- Born: 25 December 1915; Sandomierz, Poland
- Died: 15 June 1991 (aged 75); Warsaw, Poland
- Military career
- Allegiance: Poland; France; United Kingdom
- Branch: Polish Air Force; France Armée de l'Air; Royal Air Force
- Service years: 1935–1947
- Rank: Colonel
- Service number: P1299
- Units: No. 303 Polish Fighter Squadron; No. 316 Polish Fighter Squadron; Polish Fighting Team; 3rd Polish Fighter Wing; No. 131 Wing RAF
- Conflicts: Polish Defensive War, World War II
- Awards: Virtuti Militari; Cross of Valour; Distinguished Flying Cross (UK)

Wacław Król (25 December 1915 – 15 June 1991) was a Polish military pilot and an air colonel of the Polish Air Force. A veteran of the Polish Air Forces in France and Great Britain during World War II, he served with distinction alongside the Royal Air Force and rose to the rank of wing commander. He also became one of the Polish fighter aces of the war (ranked 15th on Bajan's list). After the war he became a successful historian and author of numerous books.

== Life ==
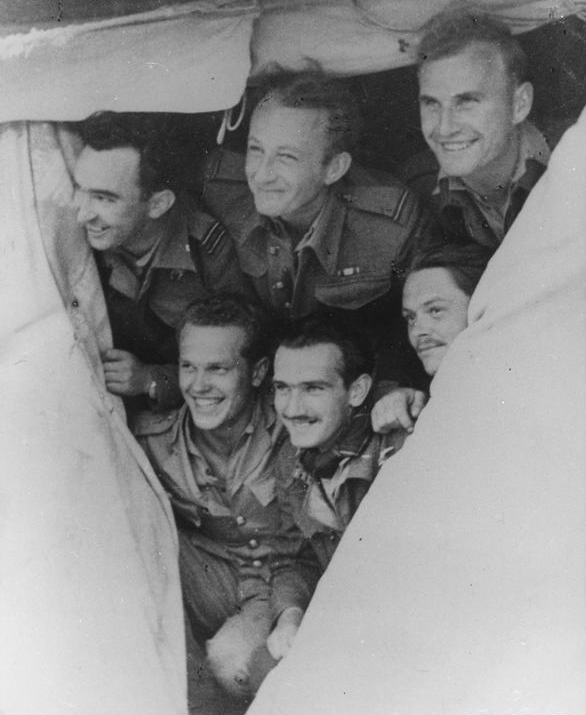
Polish pilots in North Africa during World War 2. Wacław Król is the first one on the left in the upper row.

Wacław Król graduated from the Polish Air Force Academy of Dęblin in 1935 and joined the Polish Air Forces. A deputy commander of the Polish 121st Fighter Escadrille, he scored his first aerial victory on the very first day of World War II (a Henschel Hs 126, shared with Corporal Paweł Kowala). During the Nazi and Soviet invasion of Poland, he downed one additional Heinkel He 111 bomber. After September 17 he escaped with his unit to Romania. Interned there, he managed to escape and reach France, where he re-joined the Polish Air Forces. Temporarily attached to the French Groupe de Chasse II/7, he took part in the Battle of France. During the German invasion of that country he shot down two enemy bombers (Heinkel He 111 and Dornier Do 17) and a probable kill of another Do 17.

Evacuated to North Africa and then to Great Britain, he joined the Polish units stationed there and took part in the Battle of Britain as member of the No. 302 Polish Fighter Squadron. During the battle, he shot down one Messerschmitt Bf 109 over London and one Junkers Ju 88 (shared with two other pilots). For the remainder of the war he served with various other Polish units. First with No. 316 Polish Fighter Squadron (one Bf 109 and one Focke-Wulf Fw 190), then with No. 315 Polish Fighter Squadron and eventually with the Polish Fighting Team, better known as "Skalski's Circus" in North Africa. While there he downed two German Messerschmitts Bf 109 and one Italian Macchi C.202.

Upon his return to Europe in October 1943 he rejoined the 302 Polish Fighter Sqn as its commanding officer, eventually rising to the rank of CO of the entire 3rd Polish Fighter Wing (10 March 1945) and the No. 1 Polish Wing (July 1945). Altogether during the war Wacław Król flew 286 missions, is credited with 8.5 or 9 confirmed shootdowns of enemy planes with 3 additional probable kills.

After the war he returned to communist-controlled Poland and took a series of menial jobs. After the end of Stalinism he was allowed to join the Polish Army and eventually rose to the rank of Colonel. Retired, he became a successful author of over 30 books documenting the history of Polish World War II air units.

== Bibliography ==
- Tadeusz Jerzy Krzystek, Anna Krzystek: Polskie Siły Powietrzne w Wielkiej Brytanii w latach 1940-1947 łącznie z Pomocniczą Lotniczą Służbą Kobiet (PLSK-WAAF). Sandomierz: Stratus, 2012, p. 313. ISBN 9788361421597
- Jerzy Pawlak: Absolwenci Szkoły Orląt: 1925-1939. Warsaw: Retro-Art, 2009, p. 168. ISBN 8387992224
- Piotr Sikora: Asy polskiego lotnictwa. Warsaw: Oficyna Wydawnicza Alma-Press. 2014, pp. 242–249. ISBN 9788370205607
- Gretzyngier, Robert; Matusiak, Wojtek; Zieliński, Józef (2012). Asy lotnictwa polskiego (in Polish). Warsaw: Dom Wydawniczy "Bellona". ISBN 978-83-11-12394-6. OCLC 828978115.
- Józef Zieliński: Lotnicy polscy w Bitwie o Wielką Brytanię. Warsaw: Oficyna Wydawnicza MH, 2005, pp. 101–102. ISBN 8390662043
