= Kazimierz Rutkowski =

Polish World War II fighter ace (1914–1995)

Kazimierz Rutkowski DFC
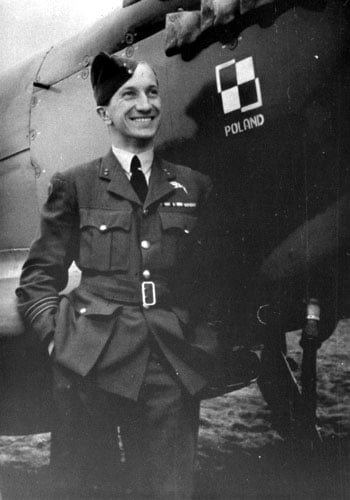
- Born: 24 May 1914; Liszno Russian Empire (present-day Poland)
- Died: 3 May 1995 (aged 80); San Diego, California, U.S.
- Military career
- Allegiance: Poland; United Kingdom; United States of America
- Branch: Polish Air Force; Royal Air Force; United States Air Force
- Rank: Wing commander
- Service number: 784518
- Units: Polish 132nd Fighter Escadrille; Polish 36th Observation Escadrille; No. 306 Polish Fighter Squadron; No. 317 Polish Fighter Squadron; 61st Fighter Squadron; 56th Fighter Group
- Commands: No. 306 Polish Fighter Squadron; 3rd Polish Fighter Wing; No. 133 Wing RAF
- Conflicts: Polish Defensive War, World War II
- Awards: Virtuti Militari; Cross of Valour; Distinguished Flying Cross (United Kingdom); Victory Medal (United Kingdom)

Kazimierz Rutkowski DFC (24 May 1914 – 3 May 1995) was a Polish fighter ace of the Polish Air Force in World War II with 5 confirmed kills and one shared.

== Biography ==
Kazimierz Rutkowski was born in Liszno near Lublin. In 1938 he was graduated from the Polish Air Force Academy in Dęblin and assigned to the Polish 132nd Fighter Escadrille in Poznań. During the August 1939 mobilization he was posted to the Polish 36th Observation Escadrille where he flew Lublin R-XIII planes. On 9 September he was hit and crash-landed.

After the Invasion of Poland Rutkowski arrived in the UK, since 4 September 1940 he served in the No. 306 Polish Fighter Squadron. On 19 May 1941 he was wounded. After Rutkowski returned to health he was ordered to the No. 317 Polish Fighter Squadron. On 18 December 1941 he shot down his first plane. From 23 August 1942 to 17 March 1943 he was commander of the No. 306 Squadron. On 11 May 1944 he volunteered to join the USAAF 61st Fighter Squadron where he flew P-47. From 11 October 1944 to 30 January 1945 Rutkowski was commander of the 3rd Polish Fighter Wing. He was also the commander of the No. 133 Wing RAF.

Kazimierz Rutkowski died on 3 May 1995 in San Diego.

== Aerial victory credits ==
- Bf 109 – 16 June 1941 (damaged)
- Bf 109 – 18 December 1941
- Bf 109 – 30 December 1941
- He 111 – 19 August 1942
- Do 217 – 19 August 1942
- Fw 190 – 21 January 1943 (probably destroyed)
- Fw 190 – 15 February 1943
- 1/2 Bf 109 – 18 October 1944
- Fw 190 – 7 December 1944 (probably destroyed)

== Awards ==
Virtuti Militari, Silver Cross
Cross of Valour (Poland), three times
Distinguished Flying Cross (United Kingdom)
Victory Medal (United Kingdom)
