= Velennes =

Velennes may refer to the following places in France:

- Velennes, Oise, a commune in the Oise department
- Velennes, Somme, a commune in the Somme department
