= Bohdan Arct =

Polish fighter pilot and writer

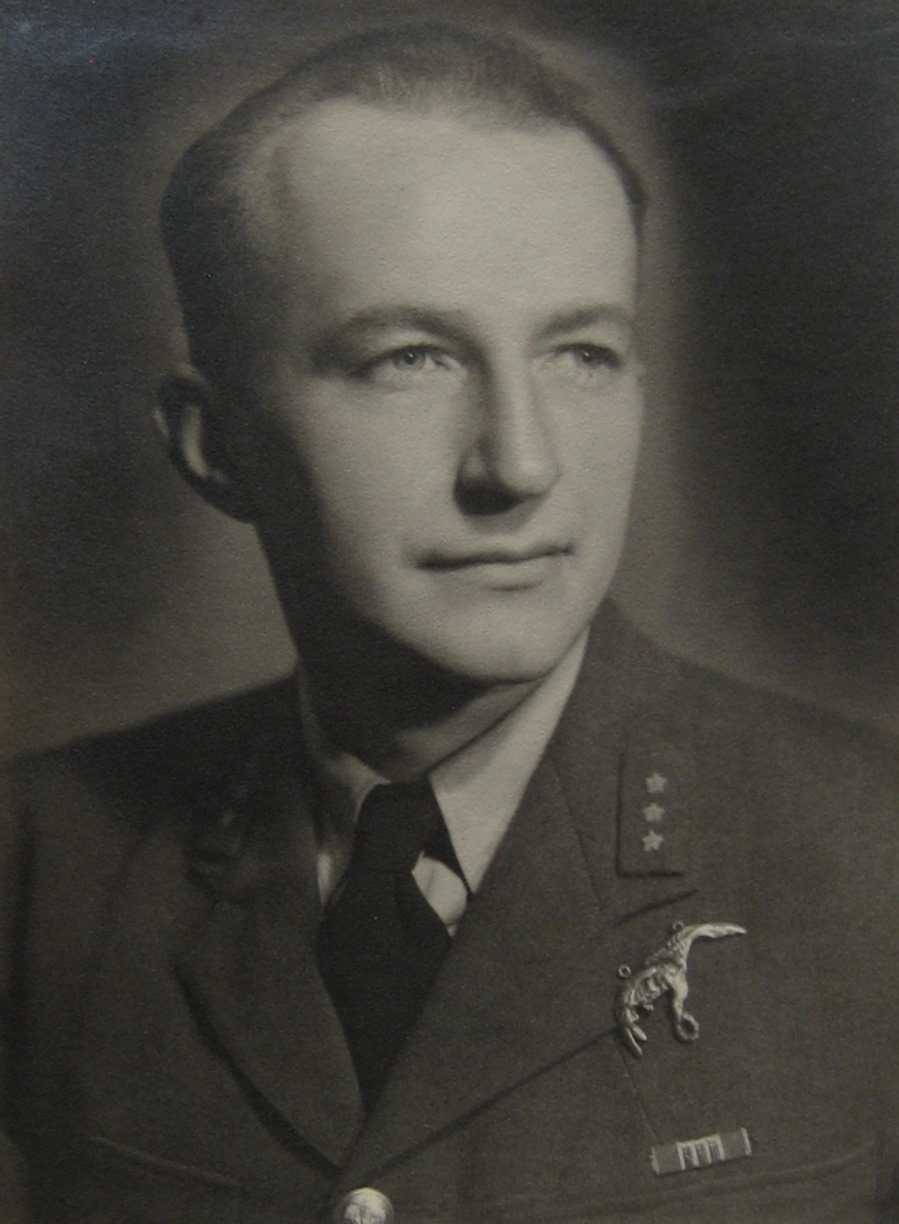
- Arct in 1943
- Born: 27 May 1914; Warsaw, Poland
- Died: 14 May 1973 (aged 58); Siedlce, Poland
- Military career
- Allegiance: Poland
- Branch: Polish Air Force
- Commands: Polish No. 316 Squadron
- Awards: Virtuti Militari, Silver Cross; Krzyż Walecznych (Cross of Valour), and three bars
- Other work: Author and Historian

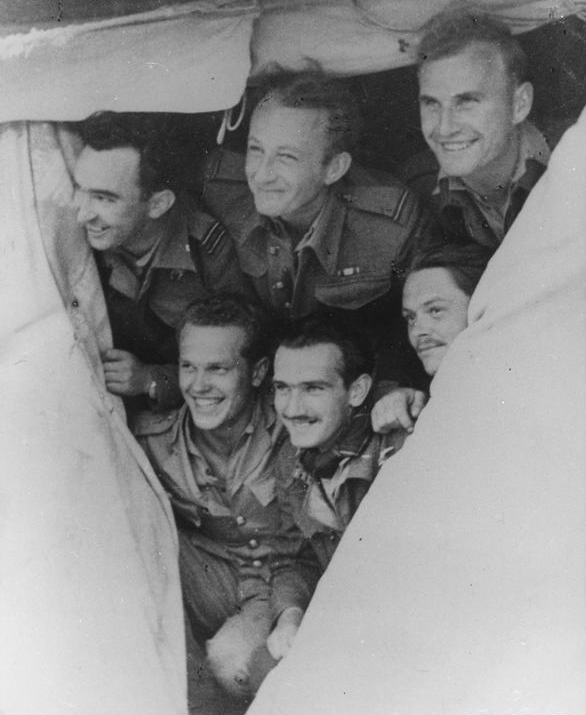
Arct (top row, middle) with fellow pilots of the Polish Fighting Team in Tunisia (1943)

Bohdan Arct (born 27 May 1914 in Warsaw – 14 May 1973 in Siedlce, Poland) was a Polish fighter pilot of the Polish Air Forces in France and Great Britain in World War II, and writer.

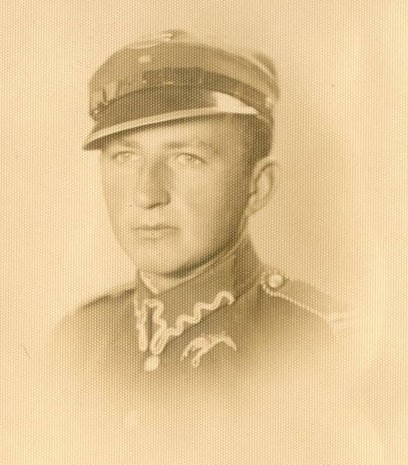
Bohdan Arct during his studies at the Academy of Fine Arts

Arct fought in the Polish armed forces until the fall of Poland at the beginning of World War II. He escaped to France and served as a flight instructor with the French Air Force in French North Africa. After France capitulated in June 1940, Arct flew to Great Britain and became a fighter pilot at the beginning of 1941, attending Royal Air Force (RAF) Operational Training Unit 61, and then joined the No. 306 Polish Fighter Squadron (RAF) in October 1941.

During mid-1943, Arct flew missions in North Africa with the Polish Fighting Team, which was attached as "C" Flight to No. 145 Squadron RAF. He claimed one Bf 109, one probable, and two damaged at this time. In July 1943 he returned to No. 306 as a flight commander, and in August was posted to Polish No. 303 Squadron RAF, claiming a FW 190 on 17 August.

In June 1944, Arct took command of the No. 316 Polish Fighter Squadron (RAF). He shot down two V-1 flying bombs in mid 1944, and a Bf 109 on 14 August 1944. On 6 September 1944 he was forced to bail out over the Netherlands due to his P-51 Mustang suffering engine failure. He was interned as a prisoner of war in Stalag Luft I.

When Arct was released from internment in 1945 he returned to England. In 1947, Arct moved with his English wife Beryl and their daughter to Communist Poland, first to Wrocław, then Warsaw and finally Dobrzanów, where he joined his mother. Like many other Poles who had fought in the armed forces of the Western Allies, he suffered repression from the new government of the People's Republic of Poland until the 1956 Khrushchev Thaw and De-Stalinization.

Between 1944 and 1973 he wrote forty four books, mostly on wartime aviation, including his memoirs, with four million copies sold overall.

Arct died suddenly in 1973 at the age of 58.

== Awards ==
Virtuti Militari, Silver Cross
Krzyż Walecznych (Cross of Valour), and three bars

== Works (partial) ==
- W pogoni za Luftwaffe (1946)
- Messerschmitty w słońcu (1947)
- Cyrk Skalskiego (1957)
- W pościgu za V-1 (1957)
- Wielki dzien dywizjonu 303 (1957)
- W podniebnej chwale (1958)
- Rycerze biało-czerwonej szachownicy
- Kamikadze – Boski Wiatr (1961)
- Cena życia (1964)
- Skrzydła nad Warszawą (1964)
- Polacy w bitwie o Anglie (1967)
- Niebo w ogniu (1970)
- Alarm w Saint Omer (1971)
- Obce niebo (1971)
- Polacy w walce z bronią V (1972)
- Jeniec wojenny (2003)
