= Cwynar =

Cwynar is a surname. Notable people with the surname include:

- Michał Cwynar (1915–2008), Polish fighter ace
- Sara Cwynar (born 1985), Canadian contemporary artist
