= Tadeusz Sawicz =

Polish fighter pilot

Tadeusz Władysław Sawicz
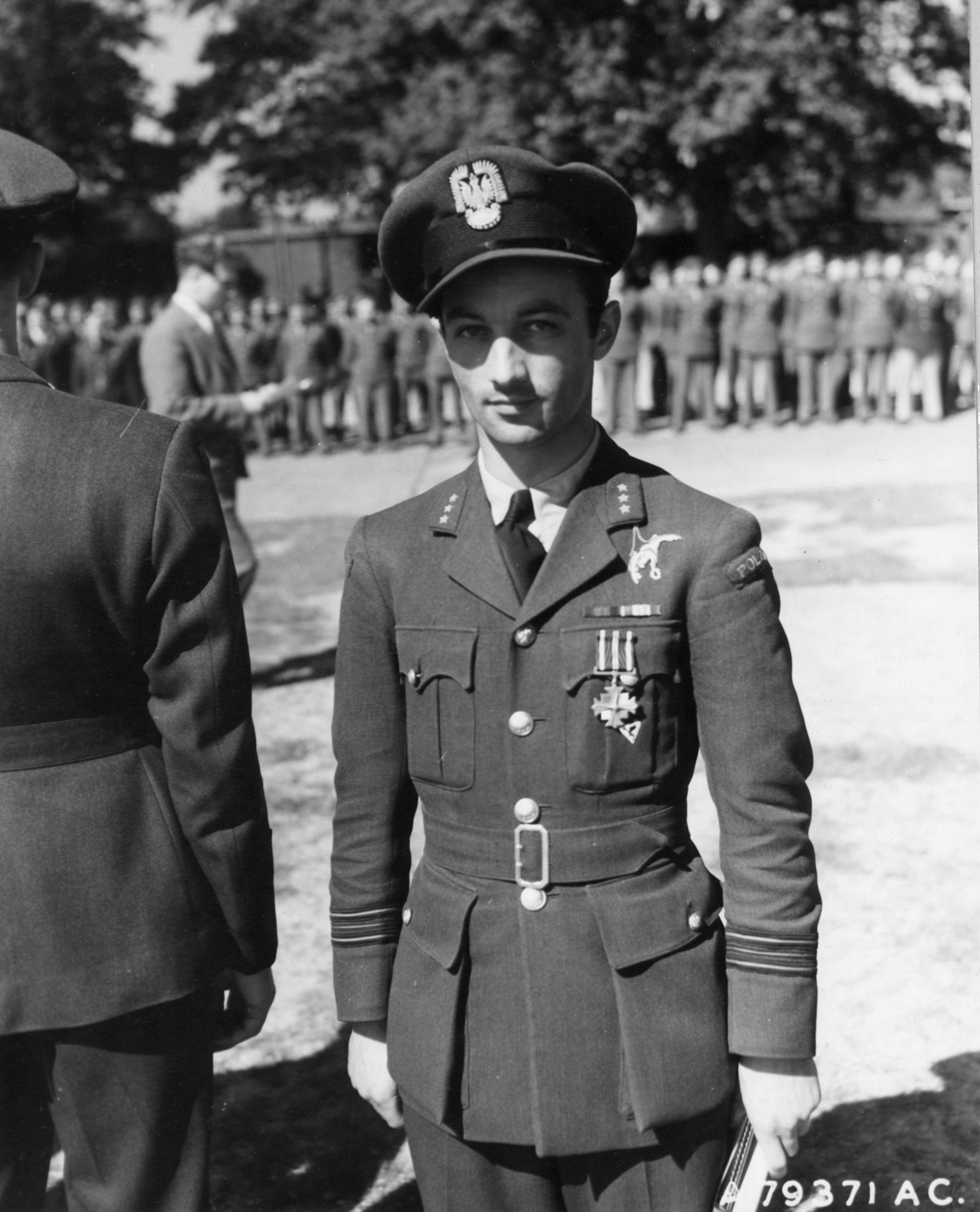
- Sawicz in July, 1943
- Born: 13 February 1914; Warsaw, Poland
- Died: 19 October 2011 (aged 97); Toronto, Ontario, Canada
- Military career
- Allegiance: Poland, Allied Powers
- Branch: Polish Air Force; French Air Force; Royal Air Force; US Army Air Forces
- Service years: 1934–1947
- Rank: Wing Commander, Brigadier General (Hon)
- Units: 111th Fighter Escadrille; 114th Fighter Escadrille; Groupe de Chasse III/10; No. 303 Squadron; No. 316 Squadron; 56th Fighter Group
- Commands: No. 315 Squadron; No. 131 Wing; No. 133 Wing
- Conflicts: World War II: Invasion of Poland; Battle of France; Battle of Britain

Tadeusz Władysław Sawicz (13 February 1914 – 19 October 2011) was a Polish World War II fighter pilot. He served in the Polish Air Force, and after the fall of Poland, he served in the Polish and allied units in France and United Kingdom. He was the commander of several air units, including the No. 315 Polish Fighter Squadron, 1st Polish Fighter Wing, 3rd Polish Fighter Wing, 131st (Polish) Fighter Wing and 133rd Fighter Wing. He participated in the Battle of Britain and was ranked as the 82nd highest scoring Polish fighter pilot of the war.

In addition to receiving Poland's highest military decoration, the Virtuti Militari, he was awarded a British Distinguished Flying Cross, an American Distinguished Flying Cross and the Dutch equivalent, the Airman's Cross or Vliegerkruis. In 2006 Sawicz was appointed honorary brigadier-general in the Polish Air Force.

After the war, he emigrated to Canada. At his death, he was believed to have been the last surviving Polish pilot to have fought in the Battle of Britain.

== Biography ==
=== In Poland and France ===
Sawicz was born on 13 February 1914 in Warsaw. In 1934, he joined the Polish Army in the Second Polish Republic, as an officer and in 1934, began training in the air force. In August 1936, he received the rank of podporucznik and joined the 111th Fighter Escadrille. In 1937, he was transferred to the 114th Fighter Escadrille.

During the Polish September Campaign in September 1939 he served (from 5 September) as the deputy commander of the 114th Escadrille, which together with several other air units was a part of the Pursuit Brigade. He claimed a half-share in damaging a German Messerschmitt Bf 109 on the first day of the war, while flying a PZL P.11c. Over the next week he was reported to have shot down two Dorniers Do 17 bombers, damaging two more. On 14 September, he was assigned a courier mission, delivering messages to General Juliusz Rómmel, and Marshal Edward Rydz-Śmigły, flying into the encircled pocket at Młynów. After the Soviet invasion of Poland on 17 September, the Polish government decided to evacuate the country and ordered the remaining airforce to evacuate as well. Travelling via Romania, Yugoslavia and Italy, Sawicz eventually reached France where he was assigned to the French Air Force (see also Polish Army in France). After training in Lyon, on 1 June 1940 he was assigned to Groupe de Chasse III/10 stationed in Deauville.

=== In Great Britain ===
After the fall of France, like many other Polish pilots he did not surrender and took a Bloch MB.152 across the Mediterranean to Algeria, from where he went to Casablanca in Morocco and via Gibraltar to Great Britain, arriving on 17 July. After four months training at No.5 OTU at Aston Down, he joined the newly recreated Polish Air Force in the Great Britain.

In Great Britain he was assigned on 20 October to No. 303 Polish Fighter Squadron during the Battle of Britain. On 22 February 1941m he was transferred to No. 316 Polish Fighter Squadron. On 9 April he shot down a Heinkel He 111 bomber, which was reported as the new squadron's first confirmed kill. In July he was awarded the first Cross of Valour and promoted. From 9 November 1941 he served as commander of the Escadrille A of the No. 316 Squadron.

From June 1942, he served as a flight instructor with No. 58 OTU. On 25 September 1942, he became commander of No. 315 Polish Fighter Squadron. During his time with 315 Squadron he damaged a Focke-Wulf Fw 190 on 4 April. On 16 April 1943, he became the deputy commander of the 1st Polish Fighter Wing, and was awarded the Poland's highest military decoration, the Virtuti Militari. From June 1943, he was a liaison officer with No. 12 Group RAF. From 18 October 1943, he served in a training capacity at Rednal. On 3 April 1944, he was attached to the headquarters of the 9th Air Force of the USAAF as liaison officer.

He was then assigned to the 56th Fighter Group, under Polish-American fighter ace Francis Gabreski where he formed a Polish section. For his time with the 56th Group, he was awarded the US Air Medal and Distinguished Flying Cross. On 14 June 1944, he was given the command of the 3rd Polish Fighter Wing, and on 10 October 1944, became commander of the 131st (Polish) Fighter Wing. Soon after taking the command, he was injured in a crash. On 16 July 1945, he returned to duty as the commander of the Polish 3rd Wing. Later he commanded the 133rd Fighter Wing.

During the war he had claimed 3 confirmed victories and 3 and a half "damaged". He is ranked (on Bajan's list) as the 82nd highest scoring Polish fighter pilot of the war.

=== After the war ===
He was demobilized in January 1947 with the rank of major. He chose not to return to Poland, where the new communist government was hostile towards those who had served in the Polish Armed Forces in the West. In 1957 he emigrated to Canada, where he worked in the air industry, living in Montreal and Etobicoke.

In 2006 Sawicz was appointed honorary brigadier-general by then-Polish president Lech Kaczyński. At his death on 19 October 2011 he was believed to have been the last surviving Polish pilot to have fought in the Battle of Britain.

== Decorations ==
Virtuti Militari Silver Cross
Cross of Valour – four awards
Air Force Medal (for War 1939–1945)
Polish Armed Forces in the West Military Action Cross
Distinguished Flying Cross – United Kingdom
Distinguished Flying Cross – United States
Air Medal with oak leaf cluster – United States
Airman's Cross – Netherlands
