= Michał Cwynar =

Polish fighter ace

Michał Cwynar DFC
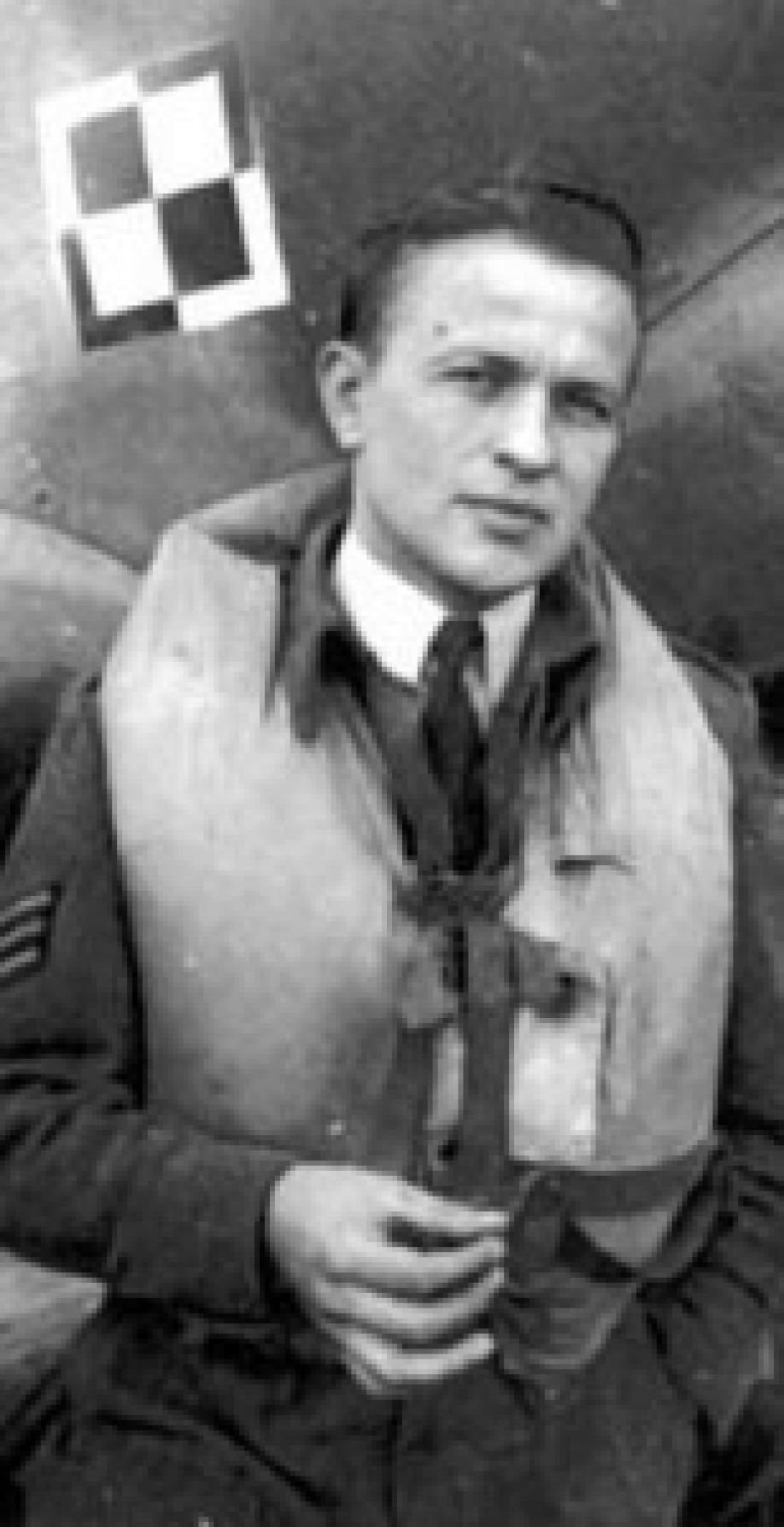
- Born: 14 November 1915; Orzechówka, Austria-Hungary (present-day Poland)
- Died: 26 May 2008 (aged 92); Dumfries
- Military career
- Allegiance: Poland; France; United Kingdom
- Branch: Polish Air Force; France Armée de l'Air; Royal Air Force
- Service years: 1933–1948
- Rank: Flight Lieutenant
- Service number: P-1903
- Units: Polish 114th Fighter Escadrille; Polish 113th Fighter Escadrille; No. 315 Polish Fighter Squadron; No. 316 Polish Fighter Squadron
- Commands: No. 316 Polish Fighter Squadron
- Conflicts: Polish Defensive War, World War II
- Awards: Virtuti Militari; Cross of Valour; Distinguished Flying Cross (United Kingdom); Cross of Merit with Swords (Poland)

Michał Cwynar DFC was a Polish fighter ace of the Polish Air Force in World War II with 5 confirmed kills and one shared.

== Biography ==
Michał Cwynar, born in 1915 was the son of Jan and Maria. In 1933 he entered the Air Force Non-Commissioned Officer's School for minors in Bydgoszcz. After he completed his fighter pilot training in 1937 he was assigned to the Polish 114th Fighter Escadrille where he flew PZL P.11. On 6 December 1938 he was posted to the Polish 113th Fighter Escadrille.

On the first day of World War II Cwynar shot down a Ju 87. On 17 September 1939 he crossed the border with Romania. On 29 October 1939 he arrived to France via Beirut. After a training on Caudron C.714 and MS-406 he took part in the Battle of France where he flew MS-406 and later Dewoitine D.520. On 19 June 1940 he flew to Algiers and finally via Casablanca and Gibraltar he came in the UK on 17 July 1940.

Initially Cwynar was sent to the 15 EFTS in Carlisle then to the No 10 Bombing and Gunnery School in Dumries. On 15 April 1941 he was ordered to the No. 315 Polish Fighter Squadron. On 14 August 1941 he shot down a Bf 109, on 16 September another one. On 1 June 1942 he was promoted second lieutenant (podporucznik). On 3 February 1943 he scored a Fw 190 near Calais. From 5 May 1943 he was an instructor with No. 58 Operation Training Unit in Balado Bridge. He returned to his squadron on 20 November 1943. On 3 July 1945 he was given command No. 316 Polish Fighter Squadron.

Michał Cwynar was demobilized in 1948, settled in Dumfries and founded his own company: "EMSEE Upholsterers & Coach Trimmers". He died on 26 May 2008.

== Aerial victory credits ==
- Ju 87 – 1 September 1939
- Bf 110 – 3 September 1939 (probably)
- Bf 109 – 14 August 1941
- Bf 109 – 16 September 1941
- Fw 190 – 3 February 1943
- Bf 109 – 30 July 1944
- 1/2 Bf 109 – 30 July 1944 (shared with second lieutenant Gwidon Świstuń)

== Awards ==
Virtuti Militari, Silver Cross
Cross of Valour (Poland), four times
Distinguished Flying Cross (United Kingdom)
Silver Cross of Merit with Swords

== Bibliography ==
- Bartłomiej Belcarz: Grupa Myśliwska Montpellier 1940. Sandomierz: Wydawnictwo Stratus, 2012 ISBN 9788361421658
- Tadeusz Jerzy Krzystek, Anna Krzystek: Polskie Siły Powietrzne w Wielkiej Brytanii w latach 1940–1947 łącznie z Pomocniczą Lotniczą Służbą Kobiet (PLSK-WAAF). Sandomierz: Stratus, 2012, s. 137. ISBN 9788361421597
- Jerzy Pawlak: Polskie eskadry w Wojnie Obronnej 1939. Warszawa: Wydawnictwa Komunikacji i Łączności, 1991 ISBN 8320607957
- Jerzy Pawlak: Absolwenci Szkoły Orląt: 1925–1939. Warszawa: Retro-Art, 2009, s. 299. ISBN 8387992224
- Piotr Sikora: Asy polskiego lotnictwa. Warszawa: Oficyna Wydawnicza Alma-Press. 2014, s. 329-332. ISBN 9788370205607
- Józef Zieliński: Asy polskiego lotnictwa. Warszawa: Agencja lotnicza ALTAIR, 1994, s. 61.
