= Eugeniusz Horbaczewski =

Polish flying ace (1917–1944)

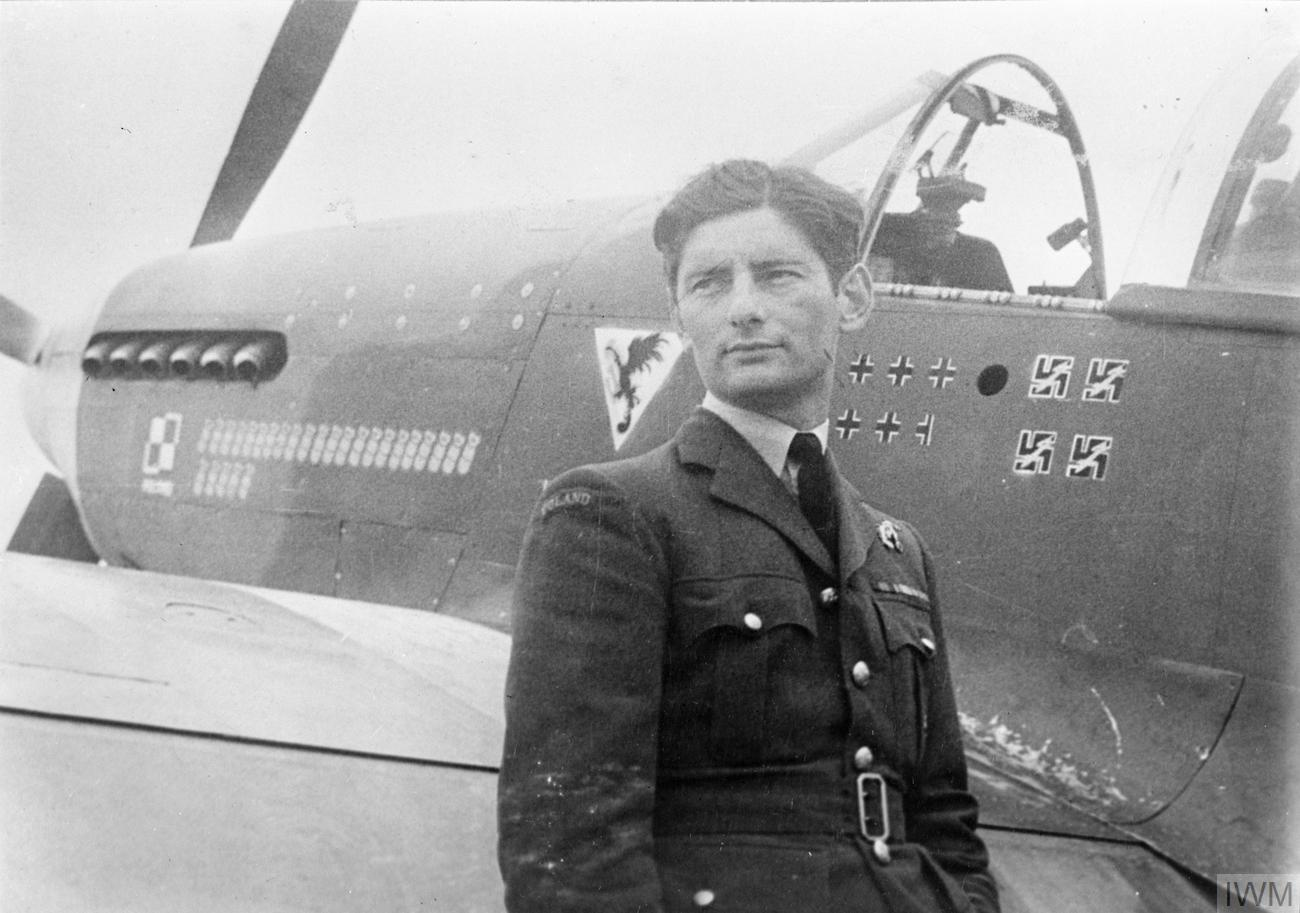
- Born: 28 September 1917; Kyiv, Russian Empire (now Ukraine)
- Died: 18 August 1944 (aged 26); Near Velennes, Oise, France
- Military career
- Allegiance: Poland; United Kingdom
- Branch: Polish Air Force; Royal Air Force
- Nickname: "Dziubek"
- Service number: P-0273
- Units: No. 303 Polish Fighter Squadron; No. 145 Squadron RAF; No. 43 Squadron RAF; No. 315 Polish Fighter Squadron
- Conflicts: Polish Defensive War; Second World War
- Awards: Virtuti Militari; Cross of Valour (4); Distinguished Service Order (United Kingdom); Distinguished Flying Cross (United Kingdom)

Eugeniusz Horbaczewski (28 September 1917 – 18 August 1944), also known as "Dziubek" (the diminutive of 'the beak' in Polish), was a Polish fighter pilot and flying ace of the Second World War. According to official lists, Horbaczewski was the third highest scoring Polish fighter ace, with 16.5 confirmed aerial victories (16 individual and one shared) and one probable. He was the Virtuti Militari IV class and V class, four times the Cross of Valour, and the British Distinguished Service Order and Distinguished Flying Cross (twice).

== Biography ==
Horbaczewski was born in Kyiv in the Russian Empire (now Ukraine), but grew up in Brest. At school, he completed a gliding course. In 1938 he entered cadet flying school in Dęblin, from which he graduated in 1939.

During the Invasion of Poland in 1939 he was made a Podporucznik (2nd lieutenant), but saw no combat. He was evacuated through Romania, Yugoslavia and Greece to France. Still without a combat assignment he was then evacuated on 27 June 1940 to Britain. After training on Royal Air Force (RAF) aircraft, on 21 August 1941 Horbaczewski was posted to the Polish No. 303 Squadron, flying the Spitfire Mk.V. He probably shot down his first aircraft, a Messerschmitt Bf 109 fighter, on 6 November over France. His first confirmed kill was a Focke-Wulf Fw 190 on 4 April 1942. He shot down a Bf 109 on 16 April and a Fw 190 on 19 August.

In February 1943 Horbaczewski volunteered for the Polish Fighting Team, also known as the "Skalski's Circus", attached to the Desert Air Force. Fighting from March 1943 in the Tunisia Campaign, the flight were attached to No. 145 Squadron RAF. On 28 March he shot down a Junkers Ju 88, then four Bf 109s (on 2 April, 6 April, and two on 22 April). On 6 April his Spitfire Mk.IX was hit and started burning, but as he prepared to jump the wind extinguished the fire and he managed to land on an airfield.

Remaining in Africa after the flight was disbanded, Horbaczewski was transferred to No. 601 Squadron, before becoming a flight commander in No. 43 Squadron RAF. He commanded the flight from May 1943 then in August he became a squadron leader (being one of three Poles commanding British squadrons). He fought with No. 43 squadron over Malta, Sicily and Italy. On 4 September he shot down a Fw 190 and on 16 September two more. In October he handed over command and returned to Britain.

On 16 February 1944 Horbaczewski took command of the Polish No. 315 Squadron, flying the new P-51 Mustang Mk. III. On 12 June 1944 he shot down a Fw 190, and on 30 July one Bf 109 individually and one with his wingman (counted as 0.5 'share'). During this period, he also shot down four V-1 flying bombs.

=== Death ===
On 18 August 1944 Horbaczewski led his squadron of 12 aircraft over France on a 'Rodeo' mission, despite being ill with flu. The squadron, using the element of surprise, attacked a group of 60 Fw 190s of Jagdgeschwaders 2 and 26 over an airfield near Beauvais. Horbaczewski quickly shot down three Focke-Wulfs, but went missing during the dogfight. In 1947, the wreck of his Mustang with his body was found crashed near Velennes (Oise).

Exact circumstances are unclear; he was probably shot down in combat by an aircraft of II./JG 26. The squadron was credited with shooting down 16 aircraft in this encounter, with their only loss being the squadron leader (according to German documents, eight Fw 190 of JG 26 and four of JG 2 were destroyed).

== Awards ==
Virtuti Militari IV class (posthumously)
Virtuti Militari V class
Cross of Valour (Poland) 4 times
Distinguished Service Order (posthumously)
Distinguished Flying Cross (United Kingdom) and bar

== See also ==
- List of solved missing person cases (pre-1950)

== Bibliography ==
- Tadeusz Jerzy Krzystek, Anna Krzystek: Polskie Siły Powietrzne w Wielkiej Brytanii w latach 1940–1947 łącznie z Pomocniczą Lotniczą Służbą Kobiet (PLSK-WAAF). Sandomierz: Stratus, 2012, p. 225. ISBN 9788361421597
- Jerzy Pawlak: Absolwenci Szkoły Orląt: 1925–1939. Warszawa: Retro-Art, 2009, p. 234. ISBN 8387992224
- Piotr Sikora: Asy polskiego lotnictwa. Warszawa: Oficyna Wydawnicza Alma-Press. 2014, pp. 167–173. ISBN 9788370205607
- Grzegorz Śliżewski, Grzegorz Sojda: Cyrk Skalskiego. Przyczynek do monografii. Warszawa: ZP Grupa Sp. z o.o., 2009 ISBN 978-83-61529-30-9
- Józef Zieliński: Asy polskiego lotnictwa. Warszawa: Agencja lotnicza ALTAIR, 1994, pp. 12–13.
