= Janusz Żurakowski =

Russian-Polish-British-Canadian fighter and test pilot

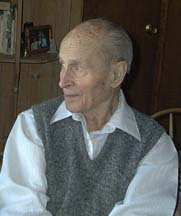
- Żurakowski c. 2003
- Born: 12 September 1914; Ryżawka, Russian Empire
- Died: 9 February 2004 (aged 89); Barry's Bay, Ontario
- Occupations: Aviator; Lodge owner
- Spouse: Anna Żurakowska
- Children: George Żurakowski and Mark Żurakowski
- Parents: Adam Żurakowski (father); Maria Antonina Szawłowska (mother)
- Relatives: Bronisław Żurakowski (brother) Adam Żurakowski (brother)
- Awards

Janusz Żurakowski (12 September 1914 – 9 February 2004) was a Polish fighter and test pilot. At various times in his life he lived and worked in Poland, the United Kingdom, and Canada.

== Early life ==
Żurakowski was born in 1914 to Polish parents in Ryżawka near Uman, which had been a village in the Russian Empire since 1793, when it was removed from Poland in the Second Partition. In 1921, following the Polish–Soviet War, the Treaty of Riga established the frontier between Soviet Russia and the Second Polish Republic. The new border placed Ryżawka in Soviet territory, so the Żurakowski family left their home and escaped into the newly established Polish Republic.

Żurakowski was educated at a high school in Lublin, where he learned to fly gliders. In 1934, he joined the Polish Air Force and entered the Polish Air Force Officers' School. After learning to fly powered aircraft, he graduated in 1935 as a sub-lieutenant. He went on to serve as a fighter pilot posted to 161 Fighter Squadron in Lwów, and in 1939 he served as a flying instructor at Dęblin.

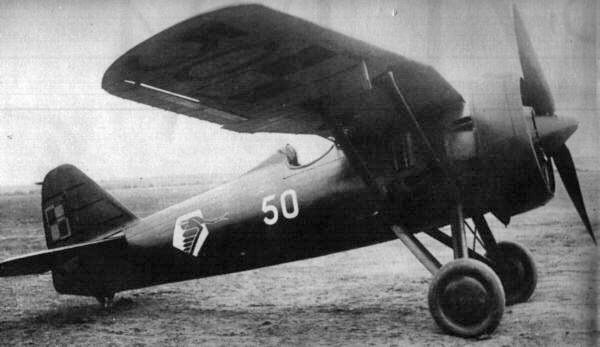
PZL P.7

== Second World War ==
In September 1939, "Black September", Żurakowski had his combat debut in an outmoded PZL P.7 trainer against a squadron of seven German Dornier Do 17s attacking Dęblin on 2 September. He was able to damage one of the Do 17s but was forced to break off combat when his guns jammed.

Following the defeat of Poland, Żurakowski made his way to England via Romania and France. Like many of his compatriots, he was smuggled out of the war zone with false documents and a new identity as a forester. Żurakowski was originally posted to a fighter unit in France before he was selected to train as a bomber pilot in England. Once he arrived in England, the RAF changed its mind and sent him and the first group of Poles to fighter squadrons, which were rapidly being deployed in anticipation of an attack on Britain in 1940.

Żurakowski was first posted as a pilot officer to 152 Squadron before joining No. 234 Squadron initially stationed at RAF St Eval, Cornwall.The squadron was moved to RAF Middle Wallop on 13 August 1940. He flew the Supermarine Spitfire Mk. 1 against the Luftwaffe, shooting down a Messerschmitt Bf 110 over the Isle of Wight on 15 August 1940. After being shot down nine days later, (Note: Zurakowski's lifelong friend, Stanislaw Wujastyk, a colleague of Żurakowski's at flying school in Dęblin, recalled in 2011, that on parachuting to the ground, Żurakowski was approached by an Englishman who said, "This is private property, you know. But never mind, come in and have a cup of tea.") he returned to duty, shooting down two Messerschmitt Bf 109Es on the 12th and 13th day after that. Near the conclusion of the Battle of Britain, he scored a "probable" over a Bf 110C on 29 September 1940. Following the decimation of 234 Squadron and its transfer to the north, Żurakowski asked for a transfer to No. 609 Squadron RAF, a Spitfire unit still in the front lines. From there he was reposted as a flight instructor to a succession of Flight Training Units, where he passed on his knowledge of combat flying to a new group of fighter pilots.

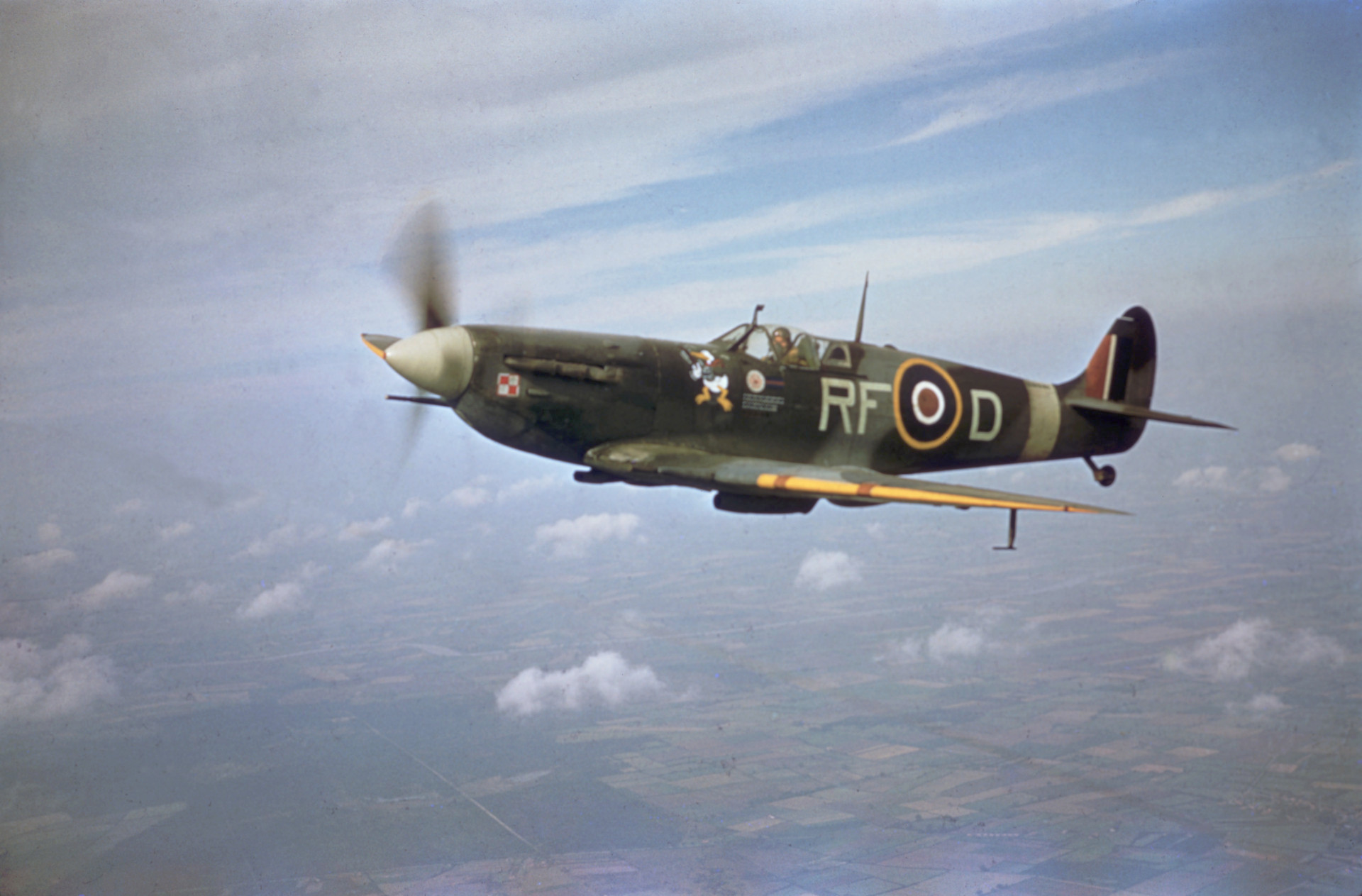
303 Squadron Spitfire V, circa 1942

In 1942, now Flying Officer Żurakowski flew again with his countrymen on Spitfire IIs in No. 315 Squadron, rising to the post of squadron leader of No. 316 Polish Fighter Squadron and deputy wing leader of Polish No. 1 Fighter Wing stationed at RAF Northolt. He often escorted USAAF bombers on daylight bombing raids. Żurakowski scored a probable over a Messerschmitt Bf 109G on 17 May 1943 while acting as the wing gunnery officer. He was awarded the Virtuti Militari, the Polish equivalent of the Victoria Cross in 1943. He also received the Polish Cross of Valour (Krzyż Walecznych) and Bar (1941) and Second Bar (1943).

== Postwar ==
After the war, Żurakowski, among many other Polish veterans, chose to stay in Britain. In 1944, he was posted to the Empire Test Pilots' School, graduating from No. 2 Course on 5 January 1945. From 1945 to 1947, Żurakowski worked as a test pilot with "C" Squadron of the Aeroplane and Armament Experimental Establishment (A&AEE) at RAF Boscombe Down, testing naval aircraft for the Air Ministry. As he had never landed on an aircraft-carrier, he practised landing in a deck-sized area painted on a runway at Naval Air Station East Haven. Following a brief training period, he landed a Supermarine Seafire, a navalised Spitfire, on the deck of HMS Ravager.

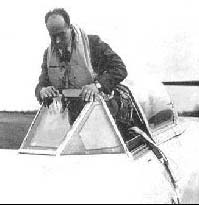
Żurakowski at work: Gloster Meteor London–Copenhagen–London record flight 1950

While still at Boscombe Down, Żurakowski flew over 30 different types of aircraft, including the Vampire, the de Havilland Hornet, and the Gloster Meteor. He never let pass "an opportunity to give the staff a display that included single engine aerobatics". Acknowledged as one of the best aerobatic pilots in the UK, he gave a notable display at the Farnborough Airshow in June 1946 flying a Martin-Baker MB 5, a piston-engined fighter designed too late to enter war production.

After retiring from the RAF as a squadron leader in 1947, Żurakowski was employed as chief experimental test pilot for Gloster Aircraft Company reporting to Chief Test Pilot Bill Waterton. When Waterton was in Canada on assignment, Żurakowski assumed the role of acting chief test pilot, flying the Gloster E.1/44 and experimental versions of the Gloster Meteor and Javelin fighters. He set an international speed record: London–Copenhagen–London, 4–5 April 1950. The attempt was organised by Gloster to help sell the Meteor IV to the Danish Air Force, which subsequently bought 20 aircraft.

At the 1951 at Farnborough Airshow, Żurakowski demonstrated a new aerobatics manoeuvre, the "Zurabatic cartwheel", in which he suspended the Gloster Meteor G-7-1 prototype he was flying in a vertical cartwheel. "This jet manoeuvre was the first new aerobatic in 20 years." The cartwheel used the dangerously asymmetric behaviour the Meteor had with one engine throttled back. It started with a vertical climb to 4,000 ft (1,200 m), by which point the aircraft had slowed to only 80 mph (130 km/h). Cutting the power of one engine caused the Meteor to pivot. When the nose was pointing downwards, the second engine was throttled back. The aircraft continued to rotate through a further 360 degrees on momentum alone, having lost nearly all vertical velocity. Carrying out the cartwheel and recovering from it without entering an inverted spin (which the Meteor could not be brought out of) required great skill.

In April 1952, Żurakowski and his family left for Canada, where he became a test pilot for A.V. Roe Canada, concentrating on experimental testing. He broke the sound barrier on 18 December 1952 as a first pilot in Canada, diving the CF-100 fighter, the first straight-winged jet aircraft to achieve this feat. While testing an experimental rocket pack on 23 August 1954, Zura survived an explosion that killed his observer, John Hiebert.

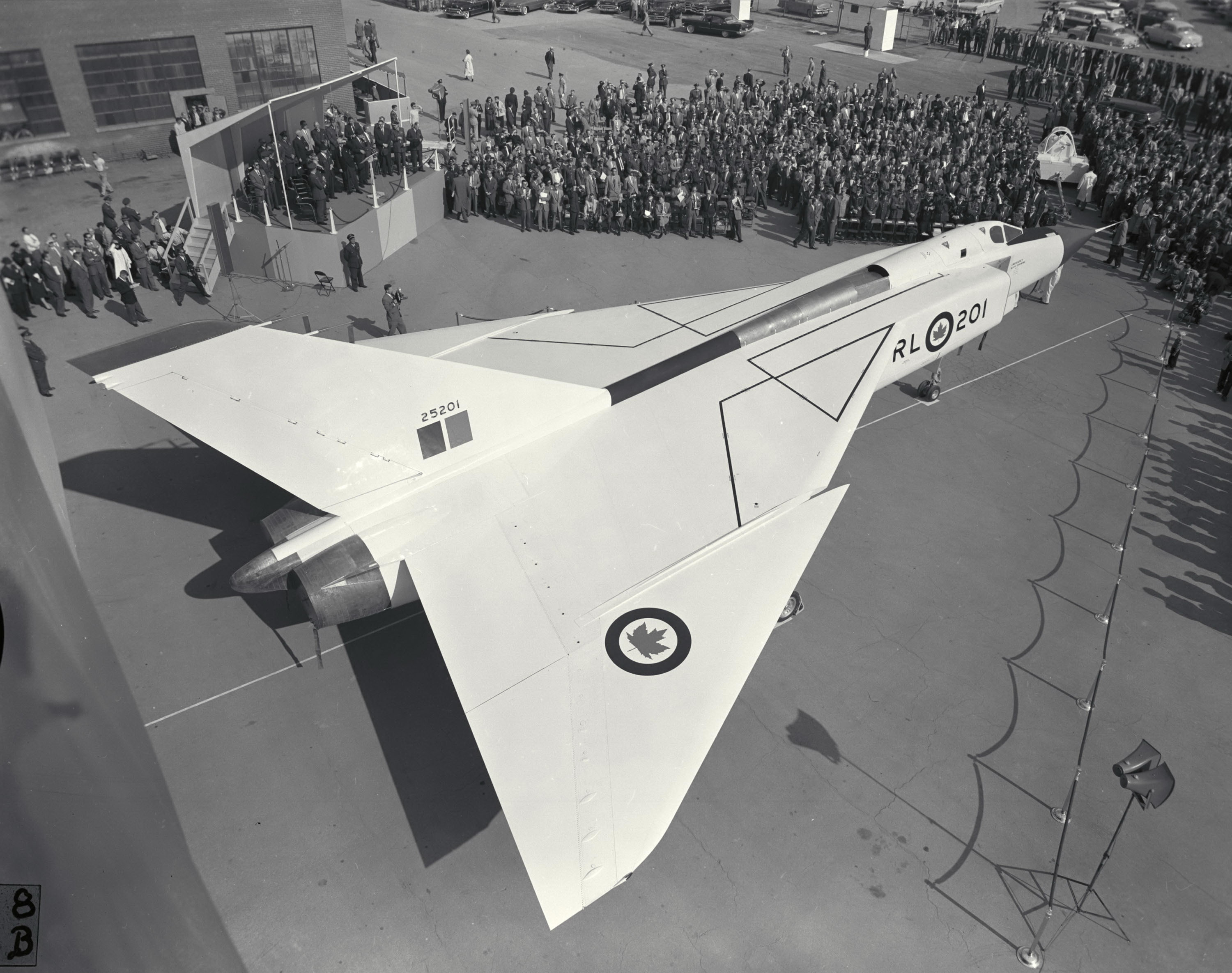
The most famous aircraft associated with Żurakowski was the Avro Canada CF-105 Arrow.

During the Avro Canada years, Żurakowski continued to fly as an aerobatic display pilot with spectacular results. Especially successful was the 1955 Farnborough Airshow, where he displayed the CF-100 in a "falling-leaf". He was acclaimed again as the "Great Zura" by many aviation and industry observers. In 1958, he was chosen as the chief development test pilot of the new CF-105 Avro Arrow programme. On 25 March 1958, with Żurakowski at the controls, Arrow RL 25201 took off from Malton, Ontario for its first flight. The flight lasted 35 minutes and was problem-free. Żurakowski continued in the flight test program. He flew Arrows RL 201, 202, and 203 over a total of 21 flights, for 23.75 hours, reaching speeds of Mach 1.89 and an altitude of 50,000 ft (15,000 m).

After flying Arrow 203 on 26 September 1958, Żurakowski decided to give up test flying for good, fulfilling a promise he had made to his wife to stop experimental flying once he reached the age of 40, although he had already exceeded that age.

== Later life ==
Żurakowski retired from active test flying in November 1958 but continued with the Avro Aircraft company as an engineer in the Flight Test Office. On 20 February 1959, the infamous "Black Friday", Żurakowski, along with the approximately 15,000 employees of the Avro and Orenda plants, learned that the Diefenbaker government had precipitously cancelled the Avro Arrow programme and its Orenda Iroquois engine. The five flying examples and the newly constructed RL-206 (slated for a run at world air speed and altitude records) along with all the assorted factory jigs and tools were broken up. Only the nose of Arrow 206 and sections of other Arrows remain. They are currently on display at the Canada Aviation Museum in Ottawa.

After deciding to leave the aviation world altogether, Żurakowski and his family moved to Barry's Bay, Ontario to build Kartuzy Lodge (located near Clayfarm Bay at Kartuzy Road and Arrow Drive). He and his family operated this small tourist lodge and resort for over 40 years. During this period, he resorted to his engineering background, "tinkering" with a number of sailboats, catamarans, and ice boats of his own design and construction. Some of these creations, including kayaks, motorboats and hydrofoil catamarans, were used by Lodge guests for many years.

Following a lingering battle with myelodysplasia, Żurakowski died at Kartuzy Lodge on 9 February 2004.

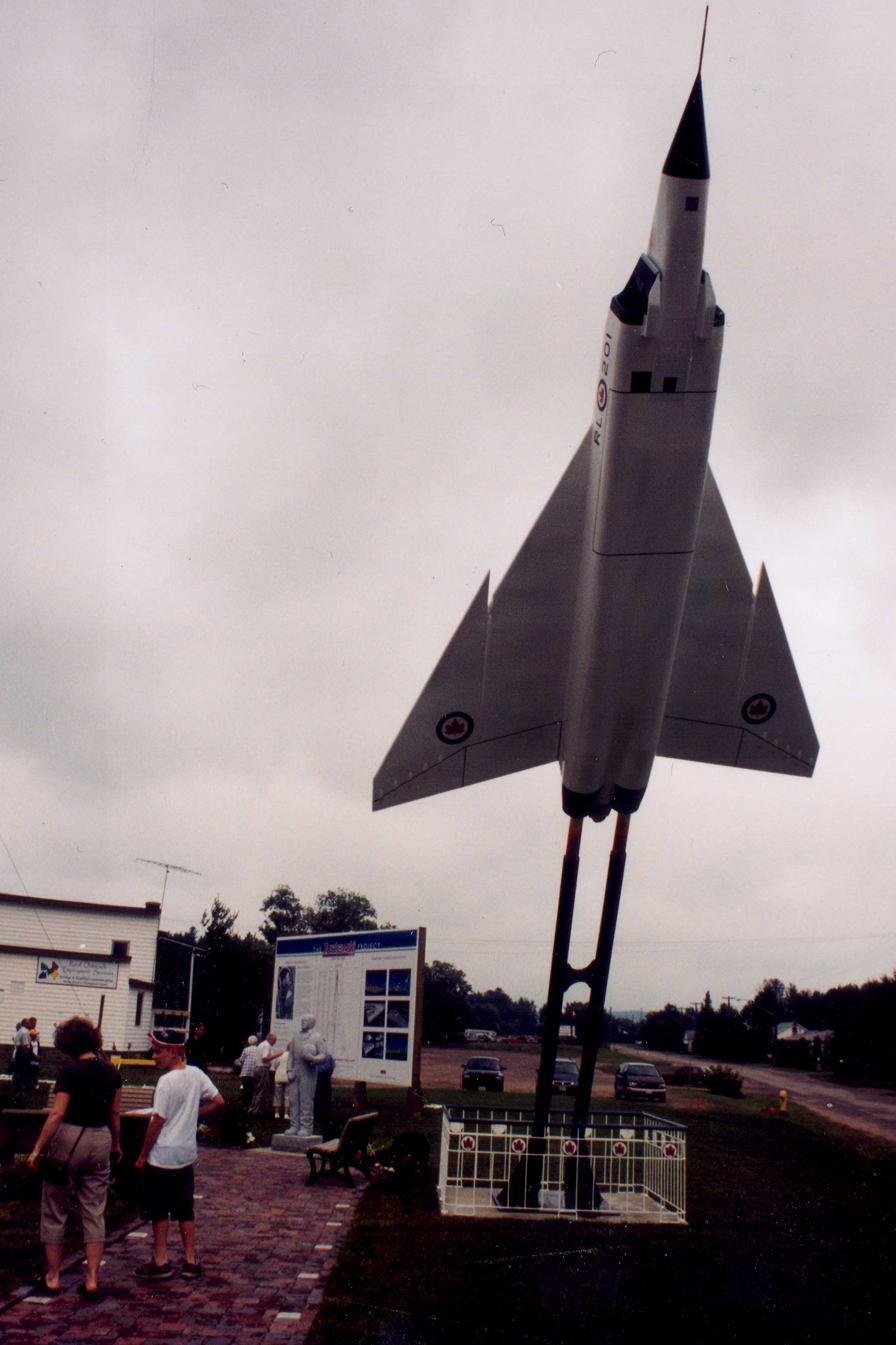
Żurakowski Park in Barry's Bay, Ontario on its dedication, 26 July 2003

== Honours ==
In recognition of his contributions to Canadian aviation, Żurakowski was inducted into Canada's Aviation Hall of Fame in 1973. He was further honoured in 1996 by the Royal Canadian Mint's release of a commemorative coin, the Avro Canada CF-100 Canuck, which featured an insert of Janusz Żurakowski. In 1997, he was inducted into the Western Canada Aviation Museum "Pioneers of Canadian Aviation" annals. He was profiled the following year in the documentary film "Straight Arrow". On 23 July 1999, CFB Cold Lake (Alberta) Aerospace Engineering Test Establishment named its new facility, the "Żurakowski Building". In September 2000, he became an honorary fellow of the Society of Experimental Test Pilots, joining the ranks of Charles Lindbergh, Neil Armstrong, and Igor Sikorsky, among numerous other luminaries.

Żurakowski received the Commander's Cross of the Order of Merit of the Republic of Poland in 1999.

His adopted hometown built Żurakowski Park in 2003, recognizing his contributions to the community and to the world. Two imposing statues of Janusz Żurakowski and his beloved Avro Arrow dominate the arrow-shaped Żurakowski Park (an elongated triangle evocative of the Avro Arrow's profile). It is located at the crossroads of two main streets in Barry's Bay, Ontario. A future museum and visitor's commemorative centre consisting of a gazebo and display area will be located at Żurakowski Park.

The former Gloster Aircraft company airfield site at Brockworth has become a residential area in Gloucester, UK and has a Zura Avenue.
