= Stanisław Skalski =

Polish fighter ace during WW2

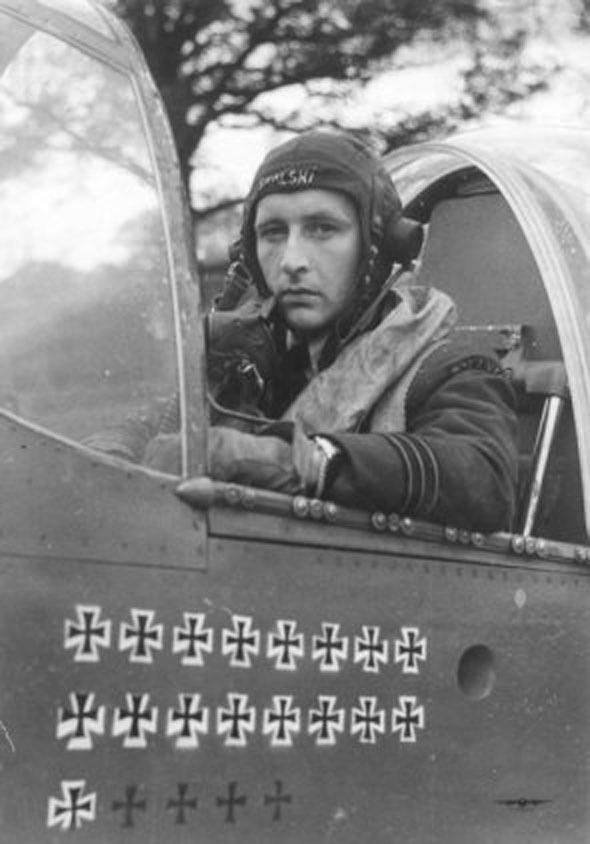
- Born: 27 November 1915; Kodyma, Russian Empire
- Died: 12 November 2004 (aged 88); Warsaw, Poland
- Military career
- Allegiance: Poland; United Kingdom
- Branch: Polish Air Force; Royal Air Force
- Service years: 1938–1945; 1956–1972
- Rank: Generał brygady
- Service number: 76710
- Commands: No. 133 Polish Fighter Wing; No. 131 Polish Fighter Wing; No. 601 (County of London) Squadron; Polish Fighting Team; No. 317 (Polish) Squadron RAF
- Conflicts: Polish Defensive War; Second World War: Battle of Britain
- Awards: Golden Cross of the Virtuti Militari; Knight's Cross of the Order of Polonia Restituta; Cross of Valour (4); Order of the Cross of Grunwald; Distinguished Service Order (United Kingdom); Distinguished Flying Cross & Two Bars (United Kingdom)

Stanisław Skalski, DSO, DFC & Two Bars (27 November 1915 – 12 November 2004) was a Polish aviator and fighter ace who served with the Polish Air Force and British Royal Air Force during the Second World War. Skalski was the top Polish fighter ace of the war and chronologically the first Allied fighter ace of the war, credited, according to the Bajan's list, with 18 ^{11}/_{12} victories and two probable. Some sources, including Skalski himself, give a number of 22 ^{11}/_{12} victories.

He returned to Poland after the war but was imprisoned by the communist authorities under the pretext that he was a spy for Great Britain. While in arrest he was tortured and then, in a show trial, sentenced to death on 7 April 1950. Skalski refused to ask for clemency but after his mother's intervention with the president of communist Poland, Boleslaw Bierut, his sentence was commuted to life imprisonment. He remained in prison until 1956 when a court overturned the previous verdict. After the "Polish October" and subsequent liberalization and end of Stalinist terror, he was rehabilitated and rejoined the Polish armed forces. In 1972 he was moved to inactive service and in 1988, on the cusp of fall of communism in Poland he was promoted to the rank of brigadier general.

== Early life and career ==
Stanisław Skalski was born on 27 November 1915 in Kodyma in Podolia Governorate, Russian Empire (now in Ukraine). In 1936, he entered the Cadet School in Dęblin. After completing Pilot Training in 1938, Skalski was ordered to the 142nd Fighter Squadron in Toruń (142 eskadra "Toruńska"). On 1 September 1939 he attacked a German Henschel Hs 126 reconnaissance aircraft, which was eventually shot down by Marian Pisarek. Skalski then landed next to it, helped to bandage wounded crew members and arranged for them to be taken to a military hospital. The following day, nine PZL P-11s of the 142 Squadron, led by Major Leśniewski, intercepted two formations of Dornier Do 17s over River Vistula. Attacking head on, the Polish pilots managed to shoot down seven twin-engined bombers, two of them credited to Skalski. By 16 September Skalski reached flying ace status, claiming a total of six German aircraft and making him the first Allied air ace of the Second World War.

Skalski's claims consisted of one Junkers Ju 86, two Dornier Do 17s, one Junkers Ju 87, two Hs 126s and one Hs 126 shared (official list credits him with four aircraft: two Do 17s, one Hs 126, one Ju 87 and one Hs 126 shared). Soon after he fled the country with other Polish pilots to Romania, and from there via Beirut to France and after went on to fight with the Royal Air Force in the Battle of Britain.

== RAF service ==
Stanisław Skalski

In August 1940, Pilot Officer Skalski joined No. 501 Squadron RAF. From 30 August to 2 September 1940 he shot down a He 111 bomber and three Messerschmitt Bf 109s. On 5 September Skalski himself was shot down. Skalski bailed out with severe burns, and was hospitalized for six weeks. He returned to his unit in late October 1940. During the Battle of Britain, he was credited with four planes shot down and one shared.

In March 1941 Skalski was assigned to No. 306 (Polish) Squadron RAF, flying in Circus sorties over France. On 15 August 1941 he crashed while landing Spitfire W3170 after returning from a mission. On 1 March 1942, he became a flight commander in No. 316 (Polish) Squadron RAF. On 29 April 1942 Flight Lieutenant Skalski was made Commanding Officer of the No. 317 (Polish) Squadron RAF for five months. From November 1942 he was an instructor with No. 58 Operational Training Unit.

In October 1942 Skalski was given command of the Polish Fighting Team (PFT), or so called "Cyrk Skalskiego" (Skalski's Circus) – a special flight consisting of fifteen experienced Polish fighter pilot volunteers. The Poles arrived at Bu Grara airfield, west of Tripoli in March 1943 and attached to No. 145 Squadron RAF. The PFT took part in actions in Tripolitania and in Sicily. On 28 March the PFT engaged in combat for the first time.

On 6 May 1943 the "Skalski Circus" fought its last battle. The unit was disbanded after the conclusion of the North African campaign. During its two months on operations, the Polish pilots had claimed a total of 26 German and Italian aircraft shot down. Skalski scored four aircraft, and Pilot Officer Eugeniusz Horbaczewski claimed five confirmed victories.

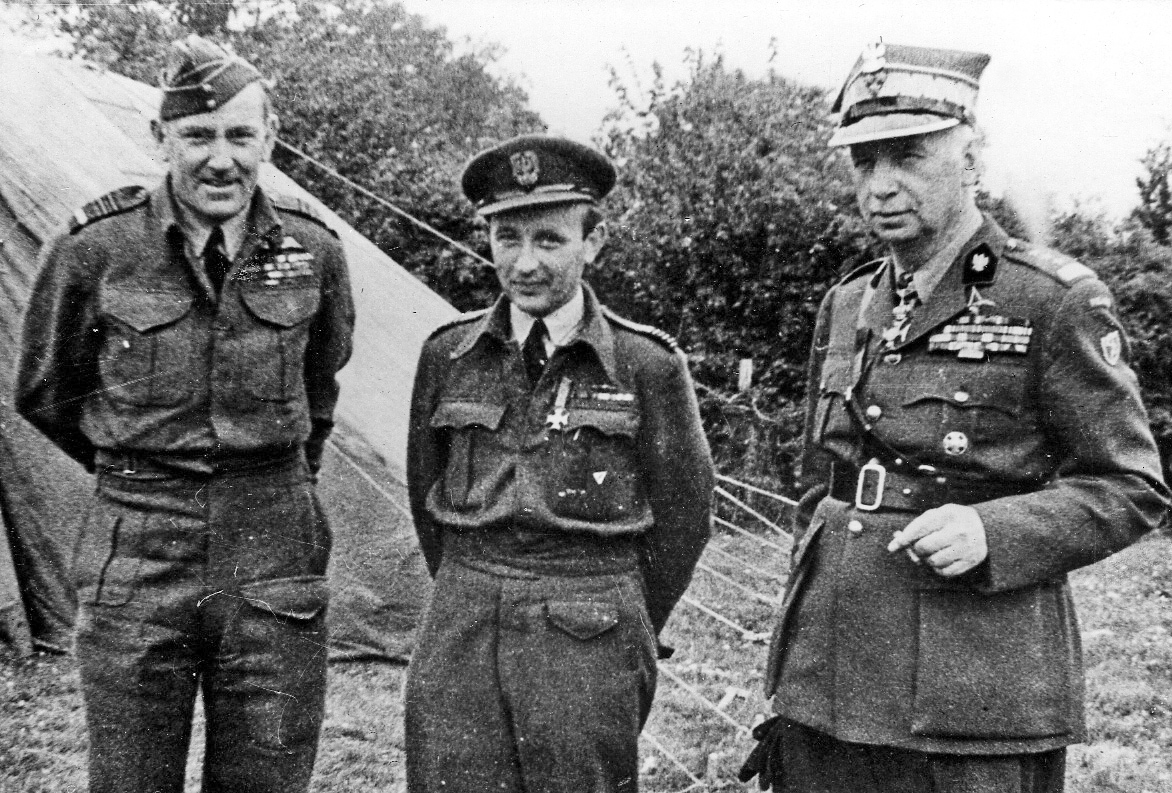
Skalski with Air Marshal Arthur Coningham (pictured left) and General Kazimierz Sosnkowski (pictured right).

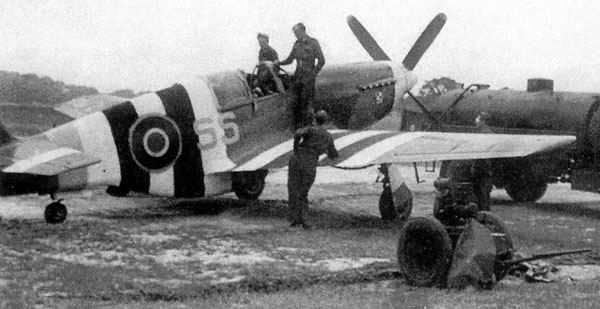
A Mustang flown by Stanisław Skalski, Coolham, June 1944.

Skalski then became commander of No. 601 (County of London) Squadron, the first Pole to command an RAF squadron. He then took part in the invasion of Sicily and invasion of Italy. From December 1943 to April 1944 Wing Commander Skalski commanded No. 131 Polish Fighter Wing. On 4 April 1944 he was appointed commander of No. 133 Polish Fighter Wing, flying the Mustang Mk III. On 24 June 1944, Skalski was attacked by Bf 109s.

Skalski left for a tour of duty in the US in September 1944, returning in February 1945 to a staff position at No. 11 Group.

== Return to Poland and arrest ==
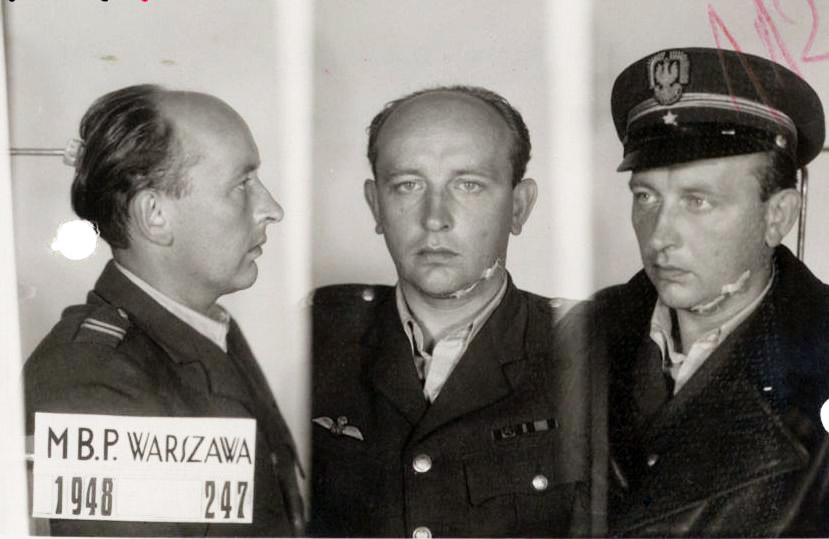
Stanisław Skalski after arrest by communist political police 1948

After the war Skalski returned to Poland in 1947 and joined the Air Force of the Polish Army. In 1948 however he was arrested under the false charge of espionage. In 1950, he was sentenced to death, he spent three years awaiting the execution, after which his sentence was changed to life imprisonment in Wronki Prison.

After the end of Stalinism in Poland, in 1956 he was released, rehabilitated, and allowed to join the military. He served at various posts in the Headquarters of the Polish Air Force. He wrote memoires of the 1939 campaign Czarne krzyże nad Polską ("Black crosses over Poland", 1957). On 20 May 1968, he was nominated the secretary general of the Aeroklub Polski and on 10 April 1972 he retired. On 15 September 1988 he was promoted to the rank of brigadier general. In 1990, he met with the German pilot whom he had rescued on the first day of the war.

Skalski died in Warsaw on 12 November 2004. He was buried at the Powązki Military Cemetery.

== Remembrance ==
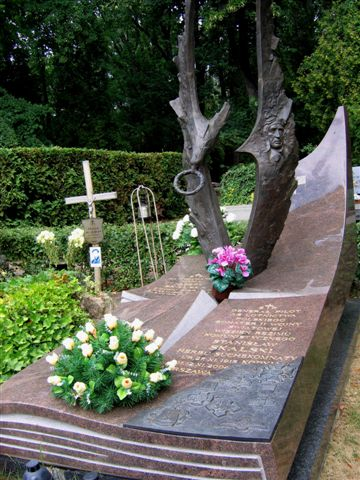
Stanisław Skalski's monument, Warsaw (Poland), 30 July 2006

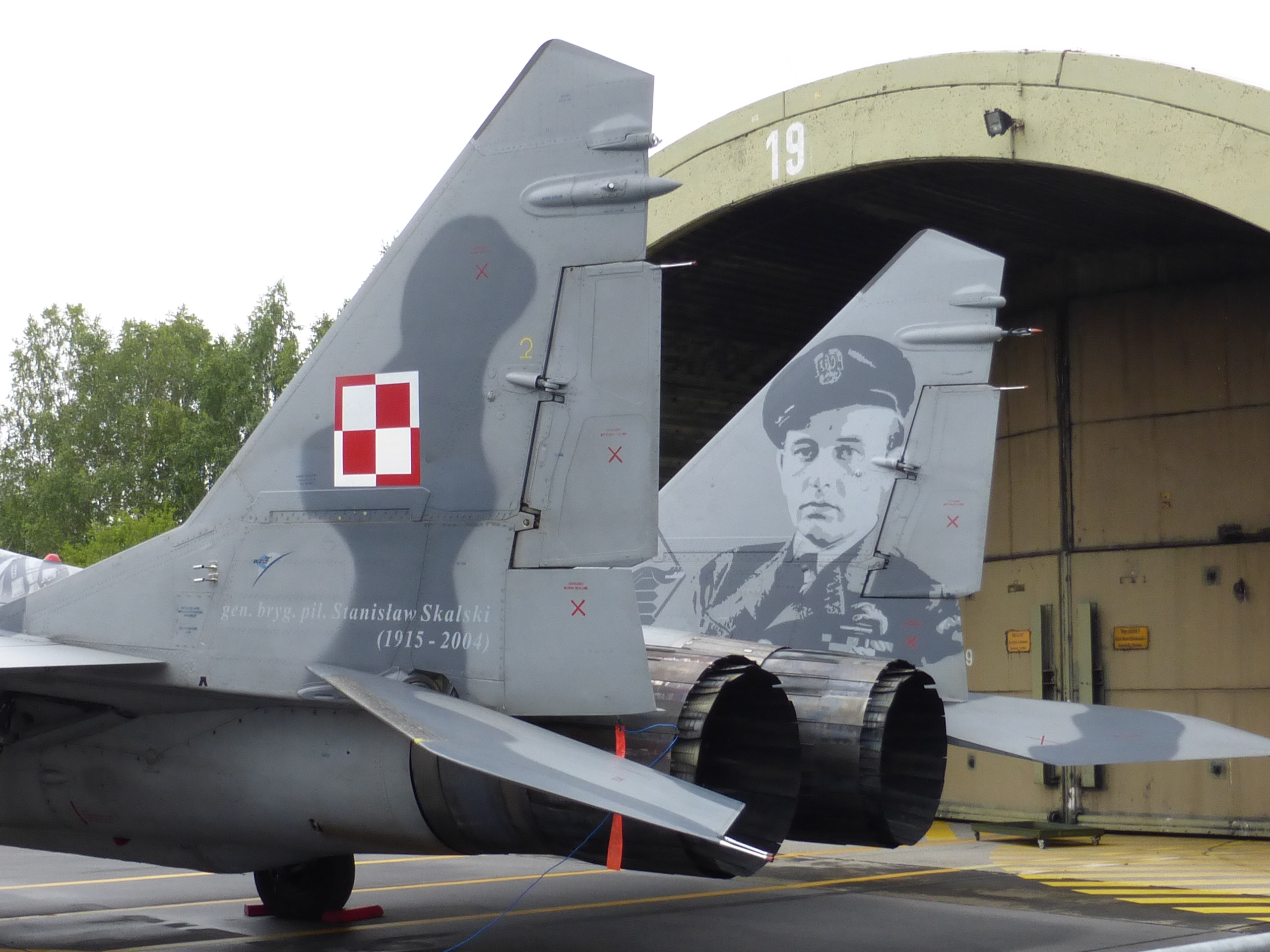
Stanislaw Skalski on the tailfin of a Polish Mikoyan MiG-29 (2016)

In 2005, a commemorative plaque was unveiled at his birth home in Warsaw at al. Wyzwolenia 10. In the same year, Skalski was the subject of a documentary film entitled Spętany anioł (Shackled Angel) by Zbigniew Kowalewski.

In 2007, Skalski's biography by Katarzyna Ochabska was published.

In 2008, Agnieszka Bujas directed a film Żyłem jak chciałem (I Lived Life My Way) which is devoted to the life and legacy of Skalski.

In 2015, another biography of Skalski was published. It was written by Grzegorz Sojda and Grzegorz Śliżewski and was titled Generał pilot Stanisław Skalski: portret ze światłocieniem.

On 2 November 2015, Vice Secretary of State, Maciej Jankowcki, acting on behalf of the Minister of Defence granted the name of Stanisław Skalski to 22nd Air Base in Malbork.

== Promotions ==
- Podporucznik (Second lieutenant) - 1938
- Porucznik (First lieutenant) - 1941
- Kapitan (Captain) - 1942
- Major (Major) - 1943
- Podpułkownik (Lieutenant colonel) - 1957
- Pułkownik (Colonel) - 1968
- Generał brygady (Brigadier general) - 1988

== Awards ==
- Polish:
  - Golden Cross of Virtuti Militari
  - Silver Cross of Virtuti Militari
  - Order of Polonia Restituta, Knight's Cross
  - Order of the Cross of Grunwald, 3rd class
  - Cross of Valour (Poland), four times
  - Air Medal, four times
  - September Campaign Cross
  - Medal "For participation in the defensive war of 1939"
  - Cross of Combat Action of the Polish Armed Forces in the West
  - Medal of Victory and Freedom 1945
  - Medal for Warsaw 1939–1945
  - Medal of the 30th Anniversary of People's Poland
  - Golden Medal of the Armed Forces in the Service of the Fatherland
  - Silver Medal of the Armed Forces in the Service of the Fatherland
  - Medal of the 10th Anniversary of People's Poland
  - Golden Medal of Merit for National Defence
  - Silver Medal of Merit for National Defence
  - Bronze Medal of Merit for National Defence
  - Medal of the National Education Commission
  - Political Prisoner's Cross
  - Wound and Injury Badge
- British:
  - Distinguished Service Order
  - Distinguished Flying Cross and two bars
  - 1939-1945 Star with Battle of Britain clasp
  - Air Crew Europe Star with France and Germany clasp
  - Africa Star with North Africa 1942-43 clasp
  - Italy Star
  - Defence Medal
  - War Medal 1939–1945
- French:
  - Combatant's Cross
  - Volunteer Combatant's Cross
  - 1939–1945 Commemorative war medal

== See also ==
- History of Poland (1939–1945)
- The Few
- Jan Zumbach
- Witold Urbanowicz
- Battle of Britain
