= Polish Fighting Team =

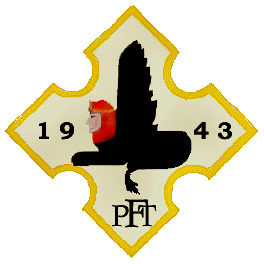
- Badge of the Polish Fighting Team
- Active: 13 February 1943 to 22 July 1943
- Country: United Kingdom
- Allegiance: (Poland) Polish Government in exile
- Branch: Royal Air Force
- Part of: Desert Air Force
- Nickname: "Skalski's Circus"
- Battle honours: North African Campaign

Insignia
- Unit code: ZX + individual number (0-10)

Aircraft flown
- Fighter: Supermarine Spitfire

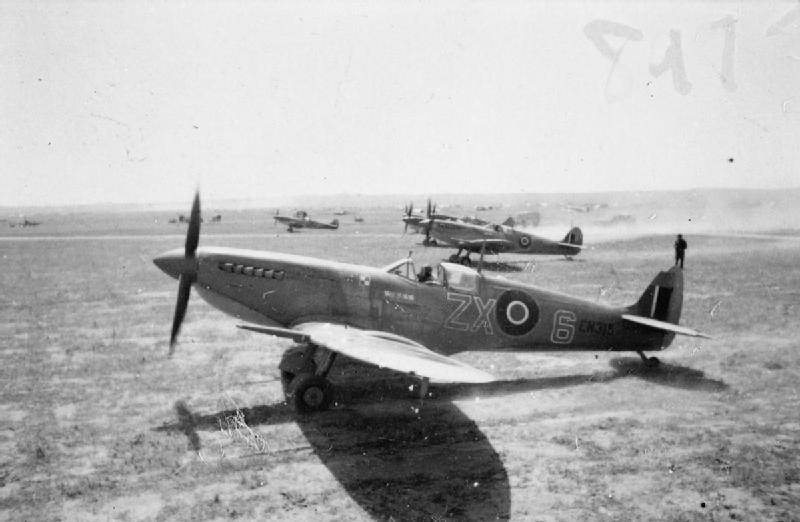
Polish Fighting Team's Spitfire Mark IXCs, with No. 145 Squadron RAF at Goubrine Airfield in Tunisia. Pilot in foreground 'ZX-6' is PTF CO Stanisław Skalski.

The Polish Fighting Team (PFT) (Polish: Polski Zespół Myśliwski), also known as "Skalski's Circus" (Polish: Cyrk Skalskiego), was a Polish unit which fought alongside the British Commonwealth Desert Air Force in the North African Campaign of World War II, during 1943. Its nickname was derived from its commanding officer, F/Lt Stanisław Skalski.

== History ==
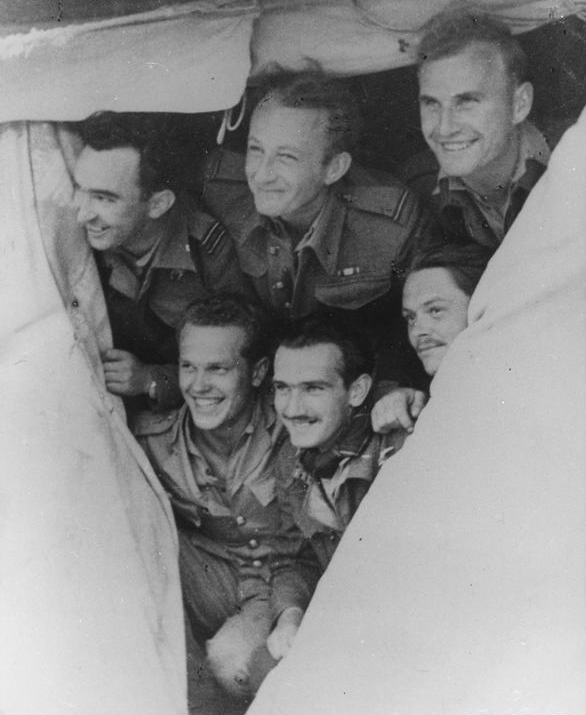
Members of the Polish Fighting Team in Tunisia (clockwise from upper left): Wacław Król, Bohdan Arct, Władysław Majchrzyk, Władysław Drecki, Ludwik Martel and Mieczysław Popek

In late 1942 Polish Air Force Staff Command requested RAF permission to send a group of specially chosen pilots to the North African theatre of operations to acquire experience in operating as a part of a tactical air force in preparation for future Allied landings on the European continent.

Volunteers had to be experienced (with at least 30 operation missions completed) and some 70 volunteers were considered before 15 pilots were chosen for the operational tour of 3 months.

Formed at Northolt on 5 February 1943 as the Polish Fighting Team, initial preparations for overseas service took place at RAF West Kirby, and the unit embarked on 24 February, arriving in Tunisia on 13 March 1943.

The team was initially attached as 'C' flight, to No. 145 Squadron RAF of flying ace S/L Lance Wade (another non-Commonwealth enlistee), equipped with the Spitfire Mk V and operating from Bou Grara Airfield, 150 miles west of Tripoli.

Commencing operations on 18 March the unit gained an immediate reputation for combat effectiveness. The unit re-equipped with the Spitfire Mark IX in late March.

Flying officer Mieczysław Wyszkowski was the only casualty in the PFT, shot down and taken prisoner-of-war on 18 April. Following the surrender of the German Army in Africa on 13 May, the PFT was disbanded.

Three pilots stayed on and became part of Desert Air Force units; Skalski became Commanding officer (CO) of No. 601 Squadron , Horbaczewski CO of No. 43 and Drecki a Flight Commander in No. 152.

=== Locations ===
- 13 March 1943 - Bou Grara Airfield
- 11 April 1943 - La Fauconnerie Airfield (64 kilometres (40 mi) inland from Sfax)
- 15 April 1943 - Goubrine Airfield
- 6 May 1943 - Hergla Airfield
- 20 May 1943 - Ben Gardane Airfield

=== Squadron equipment ===
- 15 March 1943 - Supermarine Spitfire F. Vb Tropicalised and Vc (inter alia: AB168, ER539 -7)
- 23 March - 26 May 1943 - Supermarine Spitfire F. IXc (inter alia: EN261 -10, EN267 -5, EN268 -7, EN286 -8, EN300 -9, EN315 -6, EN361 -3, EN459 -1)

=== Scores ===
Team scores for March–May 1943
destroyed	25
probable	3
damaged	9

== Personnel ==
- F/Lt Stanisław Skalski (CO) (claimed 3-1-0)
- F/Lt Wacław Król (2i/c) (3-0-0)
- F/O Bohdan Arct (1-1-2)
- F/O Władysław Drecki (1-0-1)
- F/O Eugeniusz Horbaczewski (5-0-0)
- F/O Jan Kowalski
- F/O Ludwik Martel (1-1-1)
- F/O Karol Pniak
- F/O Kazimierz Sporny (3-0-0)
- F/O Mieczysław Wyszkowski (POW on April 18) (0-1-0)
- W/O Marcin Machowiak (1-0-2)
- W/O Władysław Majchrzyk (1-0-1)
- W/O Bronisław Malinowski (2-0-1)
- W/O Mieczysław Popek (2-0-1)
- W/O Kazimierz Sztramko(3-0-0)

== See also ==
- Polish Air Force
- Polish contribution to World War II
