= No. 145 Squadron RAF =

Defunct flying squadron of the Royal Air Force

- Active: 15 May 1918 – 2 September 1919; 10 October 1939 – 19 August 1945; 1 March 1952 – 15 October 1957
- Country: United Kingdom
- Branch: Royal Air Force
- Role: various
- Mottos: Latin: Diu noctuque pugnamus ("We fight by day and night").
- Battle honours: Palestine 1916- 1918 - Turks, Dunkirk, Battle of Britain 1940, Fortress Europe, Egypt and Libya, North Africa, El Alamein, El Hamma - Mareth Line, Sicily, Gothic Line, Italy

Commanders
- Notable commanders: Peter Drummond (1918); Lance C. Wade (1943); Neville Duke (1944)

Insignia
- Squadron badge heraldry: In front of a cross couped, a sword in bend, point downward.The sword represents No 145 Squadron's role, the cross couped the squadron's association with No 14 Squadron.
- Squadron codes: SO Allocated Apr 1939 – Oct 1939; SO Oct 1939 – Feb 1942; ZX Apr 1942 – Aug 1945; B Mar 1952 – Apr 1954

No. 145 Squadron was a Royal Air Force squadron that operated during World War I, World War II and the Cold War.

== History ==
The Squadron formed on 15 May 1918. Equipped with Royal Aircraft Factory S.E.5 fighters, it supported the final offensives against the Turks in Palestine. The unit disbanded on 2 September 1919.

On 10 October 1939, No. 145 Squadron was reformed, taking delivery of Hurricane fighters in March 1940. It operated over Dunkirk and in the Battle of Britain before re-equipping with Supermarine Spitfires in early 1941. From February 1942, it was based in the Middle East, then in Malta, and finally in northern Italy, before disbanding on 19 August 1945.

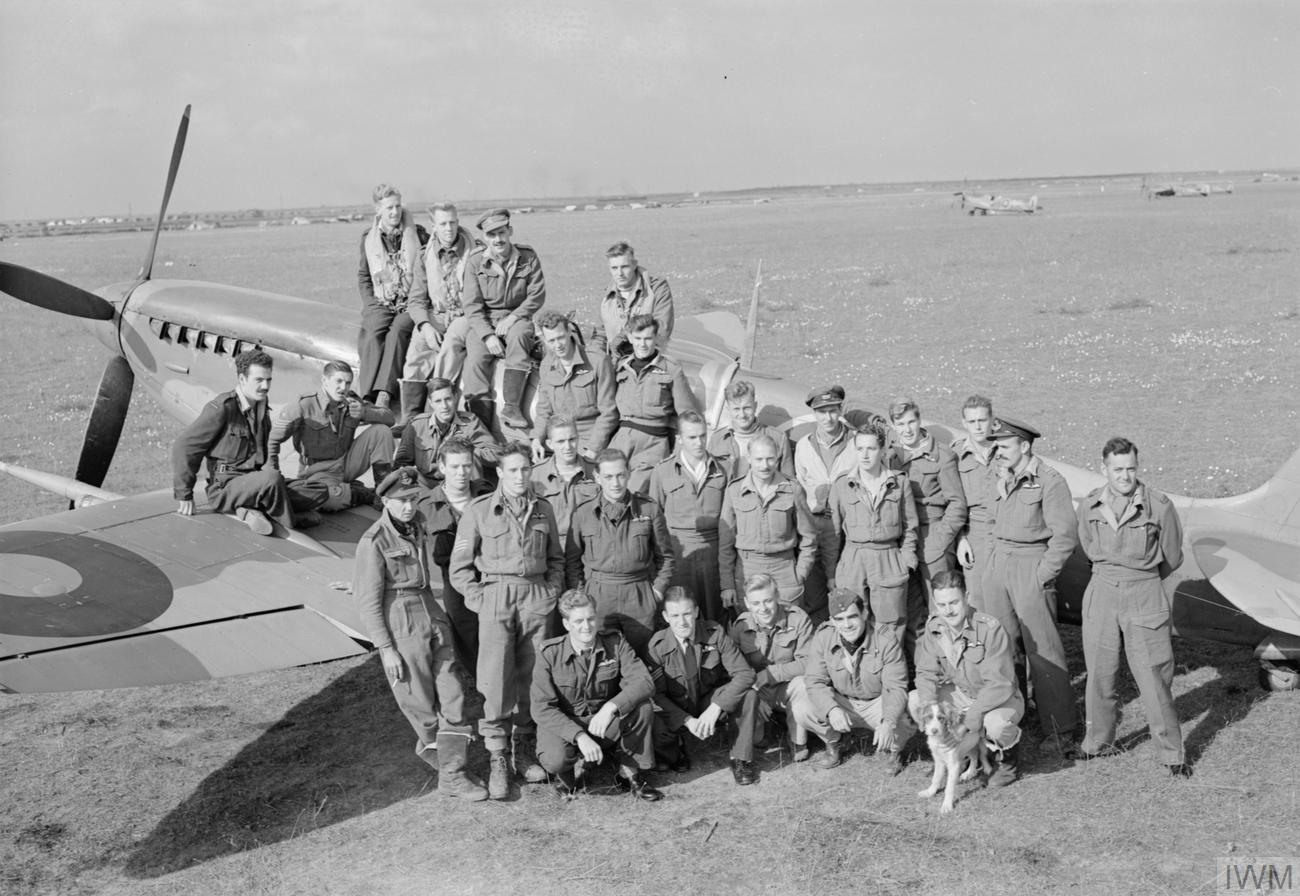
Squadron Leader Wade, second from right, with 145 Squadron pilots at Triolo Airfield, Italy

American fighter pilot Lance C. Wade, one of the leading Allied Aces in the Mediterranean Theater of Operations (MTO), was a Flight Commander and Squadron Leader of No. 145 Squadron. In spring of 1943 'C' flight of the squadron was the Polish Fighting Team. In March 1943, No. 145 Squadron pilots who came from the United States, Britain, New Zealand, Argentina, Trinidad, Canada, South Africa, Australia, and Poland were credited with 20 Axis aircraft destroyed, over one third of the total destroyed by the entire RAF in the MTO for that month. On 19 August 1945, the Squadron disbanded in northern Italy.

No. 145 Squadron was reformed once more, as a fighter-bomber unit in Germany, on 1 March 1952. Initially flying de Havilland Vampires, it converted to de Havilland Venoms in 1954. The squadron was disbanded on 15 October 1957.

The squadron number has been used on three subsequent occasions as a 'Shadow' designation for Operational Conversion Units. From 22 October 1958 to 1 June 1963 it was allocated to the Hawker Hunter equipped No 229 OCU at RAF Chivenor. The same day it was transferred to No. 226 OCU at RAF Middleton St George, which was responsible for training English Electric Lightning pilots. No 226 moved to RAF Coltishall in April 1964 and retained the number as a shadow designation until re-numbered 65 Squadron on 1 September 1970.

=== 145 Squadron RAF "C" Polish Fighting Team ===
In late 1942 Polish Air Force Staff Command requested RAF permission to send a group of specially chosen pilots to the North African theatre of operations to acquire experience in operating as a part of a tactical air force in preparation for future Allied landings on the European continent.

Volunteers had to be experienced (with at least 30 operation missions completed) and some 70 volunteers were considered before 15 pilots were chosen for the operational tour of 3 months.

Formed at Northolt on 5 February 1943 as the Polish Fighting Team, initial preparations for overseas service took place at RAF West Kirby, and the unit embarked on 24 February, arriving in North Africa on 13 March 1943.

The team was initially attached as 'C' flight, to No. 145 Squadron RAF, (under ace S/L Lance Wade) equipped with the Spitfire Mk.V and operating from Bu Ghara, 150 miles west of Tripoli.

Commencing operations on 18 March the unit gained an immediate reputation for combat effectiveness. The unit re-equipped with the Supermarine Spitfire Mark IX in late March.

Flying Officer Mieczysław Wyszkowski was the only casualty in the PFT, shot down and taken prisoner-of-war on 18 April. Following the surrender of the German Army in Africa on 13 May, the PFT was disbanded.

Three pilots stayed on and became part of Desert Air Force units; Skalski became CO of No. 601 Squadron, Horbaczewski CO of No. 43 and Drecki a Flight Commander in No. 152.

Locations 13 March 1943 - Bu Grara 11 April 1943 - La Fauconnerie 15 April 1943 - Goubrine 6 May 1943 - Hergla 20 May 1943 - Ben Gardane Squadron equipment 15 March 1943 - Supermarine Spitfire F. Vb Tropicalised and Vc (inter alia: AB168, ER539 -7) 23 March - 26 May 1943 - Supermarine Spitfire F. IXc (inter alia: EN261 -10, EN267 -5, EN268 -7, EN286 -8, EN300 -9, EN315 -6, EN361 -3, EN459 -1)

Scores:

Team scores for March–May 1943

destroyed 25,

probable 3,

damaged 9

Personnel: F/Lt Stanislaw Skalski (C.O.) (claimed 3-1-0) F/Lt Waclaw Król (3-0-0) F/O Bohdan Arct (1-1-2) F/O Wladyslaw Drecki (1-0-1) F/O Eugeniusz Horbaczewski (5-0-0) F/O Jan Kowalski F/O Ludwik Martel (1-1-1) F/O Karol Pniak F/O Kazimierz Sporny (3-0-0) F/O Mieczyslaw Wyszkowski* POW(0-1-0) W/O Marcin Machowiak (1-0-2) W/O Wladyslaw Majchrzyk (1-0-1) W/O Bronislaw Malinowski (2-0-1) W/O Mieczyslaw Popek (2-0-1) W/O Kazimierz Sztramko(3-0-0)

== See also ==
- List of Royal Air Force aircraft squadrons
- Flying Officer G.R. Branch EGM of 145 Squadron was killed in action 11 August 1940.
