= Velennes, Oise =

Velennes
- Commune
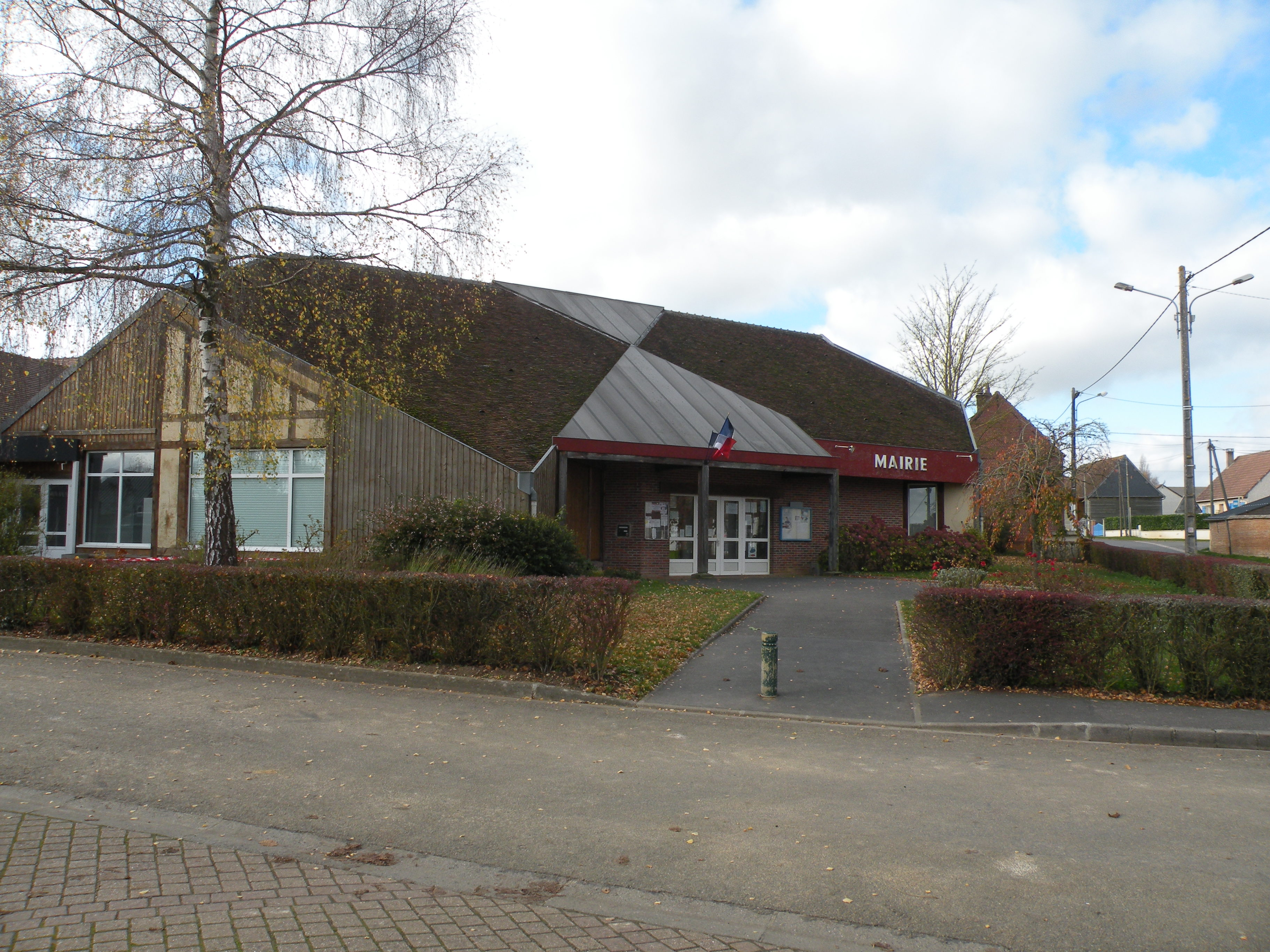
- The town hall in Velennes
- Location of Velennes
- Location within France Location within Hauts-de-France
- Coordinates: 49°28′25″N 2°11′04″E
- Country: France
- Region: Hauts-de-France
- Department: Oise
- Arrondissement: Beauvais
- Canton: Mouy
- Intercommunality: CA Beauvaisis

Government
  - Mayor (2020–2026): Nathalie Rolland
- Area^{1}: 9.06 km^{2} (3.50 sq mi)
- Elevation: 120 m (390 ft)
- Highest elevation: 153 m (502 ft)
- Lowest elevation: 119 m (390 ft)
- Population (2023): 227
  - Density: 25.1/km^{2} (64.9/sq mi)
- Time zone: UTC+01:00 (CET)
  - Summer (DST): UTC+02:00 (CEST)
- INSEE/Postal code: 60663 /60510
- ^{1} French Land Register data, which excludes lakes, ponds, glaciers > 1 km^{2} (0.386 sq mi or 247 acres) and river estuaries.

Velennes (French pronunciation: [vəlɛn]) is a commune in the Oise department in northern France.

== See also ==
- Communes of the Oise department
