= No. 133 Wing RAF =

No. 133 Wing RAF No. 133 (Polish) (Fighter) Wing RAF No. 1 Polish Wing RAF No. 133 Airfield Headquarters (Polish) RAF
- Active: 1943-44; 1944-45
- Country: United Kingdom
- Branch: Royal Air Force
- Size: Wing
- Last base: RAF Andrews Field

No. 133 (Polish) (Fighter) Wing RAF is a former Royal Air Force wing that was operational during the Second World War, mainly staffed by Polish personnel as part of the Polish Air Forces in France and Great Britain.

The unit was previously No. 1 Polish Wing RAF which became No. 133 Airfield Headquarters (Polish) RAF during 1943.

== History ==
It was formed in August 1941, as the 2nd Polish Fighter Wing, from three Polish squadrons, the No. 302 Polish Fighter Squadron and No. 316 Polish Fighter Squadron, and the No. 317 Polish Fighter Squadron. Its composition was not stable, as Polish Squadrons were frequently exchanged between the three Polish wings (the No. 131 Wing RAF (1st Polish) wing, the No. 133 Wing (2nd Polish) wing, and the 3rd Polish Fighter Wing). At various times, this wing included other Polish squadrons, such as the No. 306 Polish Fighter Squadron, No. 309 Polish Fighter-Reconnaissance Squadron and the No. 315 Polish Fighter Squadron. The number of Polish wings was also not constant, varying from at least two to four.

On 1 November 1943 No. 1 Polish Wing RAF was renamed to No. 133 Airfield Headquarters (Polish) RAF while the unit was at RAF Heston under No. 18 Wing RAF and controlling No. 306 Polish Fighter Squadron and No. 315 Polish Fighter Squadron both operating Spitfires. The wing moved to RAF Coolham on 1 April 1944 and was renamed to No. 133 Wing RAF on 12 May 1944.

No. 133 Wing RAF was formed on 12 May 1944 at RAF Coolham.

== See also ==
- List of Wings of the Royal Air Force
