= 114th Fighter Escadrille =

Fighter unit of the Polish Army

The 114th Fighter Escadrille of the Polish Air Force (Polish: 114. Eskadra Myśliwska) was one of the fighter units of the Polish Army at the beginning of the WW2.

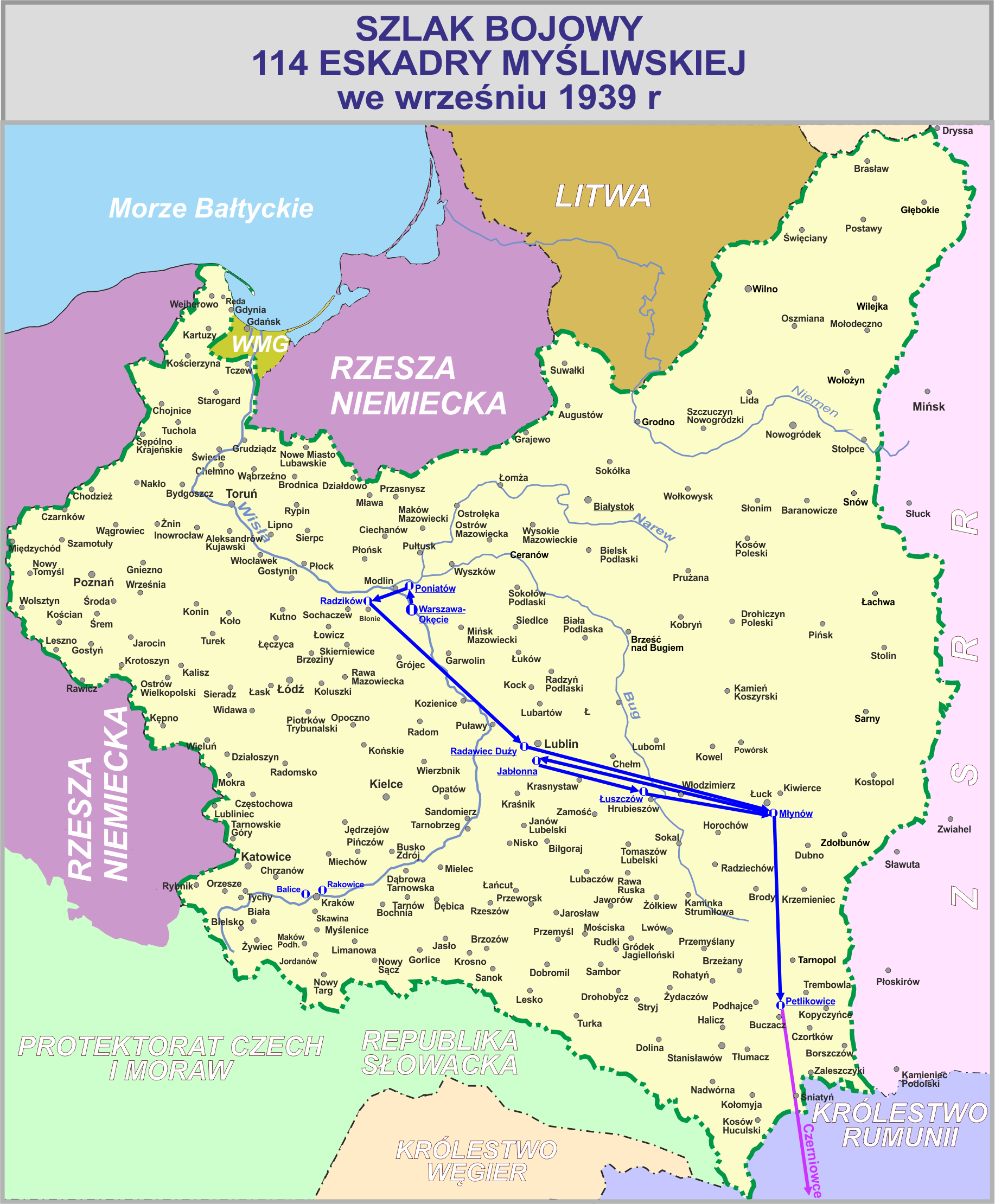

== Crew and equipment ==
On 1 September 1939 the escadrille had 10 planes: 6 PZL P.11c and 4 PZL P.11a. The commanding officer was kpt. pil. Juliusz Frey and his deputy was Jerzy Szałowski

pilots:

- ppor. Marian Szalewicz
- ppor. Stanisław Szmejl
- ppor. Tadeusz Szumowski
- pchor. Bogusław Mierzwa
- pchor. Włodzimierz Miksa
- pchor. Roman Stoga
- pchor. Zbigniew Wróblewski
- plut. Władysław Kiedrzyński
- kpr. Czesław Bielecki
- kpr. Andrzej Niewiara
- st. szer. Benedykt Dąbrowski
- st. szer. Józef Kędziora
- st. szer. Bolesław Olewiński
- st. szer. Jerzy Zieliński
- Tadeusz Sawicz, from 5 September as the deputy commander

== See also ==
- Polish Air Force order of battle in 1939
