= No. 316 Polish Fighter Squadron =

No. 316 "City of Warsaw" Polish Fighter Squadron
- 316 Squadron logo
- Active: 15 February 1941 – 11 December 1946
- Country: United Kingdom
- Allegiance: (Poland) Polish government in exile
- Branch: Royal Air Force
- Role: Fighter Squadron
- Part of: RAF Fighter Command
- Nickname: Warsaw; Dywizjon Myśliwski "Warszawski"

Commanders
- Notable commanders: Aleksander Gabszewicz; Janusz Żurakowski

Insignia
- Squadron Codes: SZ (February 1941 – December 1946)

No. 316 "City of Warsaw" Polish Fighter Squadron (Polish: 316 Dywizjon Myśliwski "Warszawski") was a Polish fighter squadron formed in Great Britain as part of an agreement between the Polish Government in Exile and the United Kingdom in 1941. It was one of 15 squadrons of the Polish Air Force in exile that served alongside the Royal Air Force (RAF) in World War II.

== History ==
No 316 Squadron was formed at Pembrey on 15 February 1941 as part of an agreement between the Polish government-in-exile and United Kingdom. It was a Polish fighter unit initially equipped with Hurricanes. Initially, it engaged in defensive duties over South West England. By mid 1941, and began flying offensive sweeps over northern France with Hurricane Mk.IIs. In October 1941, it re-equipped with the Spitfire Mk.Vb; Mk.IXc; and Mk.XVIe aircraft and moved to RAF Northolt. In this period, it began conduct more offensive actions over occupied Europe. In July 1942, the squadron transferred to Yorkshire, and continued offensive operations from there. In 1943 it re-equipped again with Mustang Mk.3 aircraft. In April 1944, it again relocated to East Anglia, from which it conducted fighter bomber and escort missions in the lead up to the D-Day landings. In 1944, it relocated to the South of England, where it intercepted German V-1 cruise missiles. The squadron was disbanded on 11 December 1946.

Some well known Polish pilots who flew with Squadron 316 include Wacław Król, Michał Maciejowski, Michał Cwynar, Jerzy Bajan, Jan Kowalski, Tadeusz Sawicz, Józef Jeka, Janusz Żurakowski, Władysław Gnyś, Bohdan Arct, Tadeusz Góra, and Stanisław Skalski.

== Commanding officers ==
From	To	Name	Remark
Feb 1941	Mar 1941	Captain Juliusz Frey	
Mar 1941	Jul 1941	S/Ldr C.J. Donovan	British Officer
Jul 1941	Sep 1941	Captain Juliusz Frey	
Sep 1941	Nov 1941	Captain Wacław Wilczewski	
Nov 1941	Jun 1942	Captain Aleksander Gabszewicz	
Jun 1942	Dec 1942	Captain Janusz Żurakowski	
Dec 1942	Sep 1943	Captain Marian Trzebiński	
Sep 1943	Jun 1944	Captain Paweł Niemiec	
Jun 1944	Sep 1944	Captain Bohdan Arct	
Sep 1944	Jul 1945	Captain Zygmunt Drybański	
Jul 1945	Oct 1945	Captain Michał Cwynar	
Oct 1945	Dec 1946	Captain Paweł Niemiec	

== Squadron bases ==
From	To	Name
Feb 1941	Jun 1941	RAF Pembrey
Jun 1941	Aug 1941	RAF Colerne
Aug 1941	Dec 1941	RAF Churchstanton
Dec 1941	Apr 1942	RAF Northolt
Apr 1942	Jul 1942	RAF Heston
Jul 1942	Mar 1943	RAF Hutton Cranswick
Mar 1943	Sep 1943	RAF Northolt
Sep 1943	Feb 1944	RAF Acklington
Feb 1944	Apr 1944	RAF Woodvale
Apr 1944	Jul 1944	RAF Coltishall
Jul 1944	Jul 1944	RAF West Malling
Jul 1944	Aug 1944	Friston
Aug 1944	Oct 1944	RAF Coltishall
Oct 1944	May 1945	RAF Andrews Field
May 1945	Aug 1945	RAF Coltishall
Aug 1945	Nov 1945	RAF Andrews Field
Nov 1945	Mar 1946	Wick
Mar 1946	Dec 1946	RAF Hethel

== Aircraft operated ==
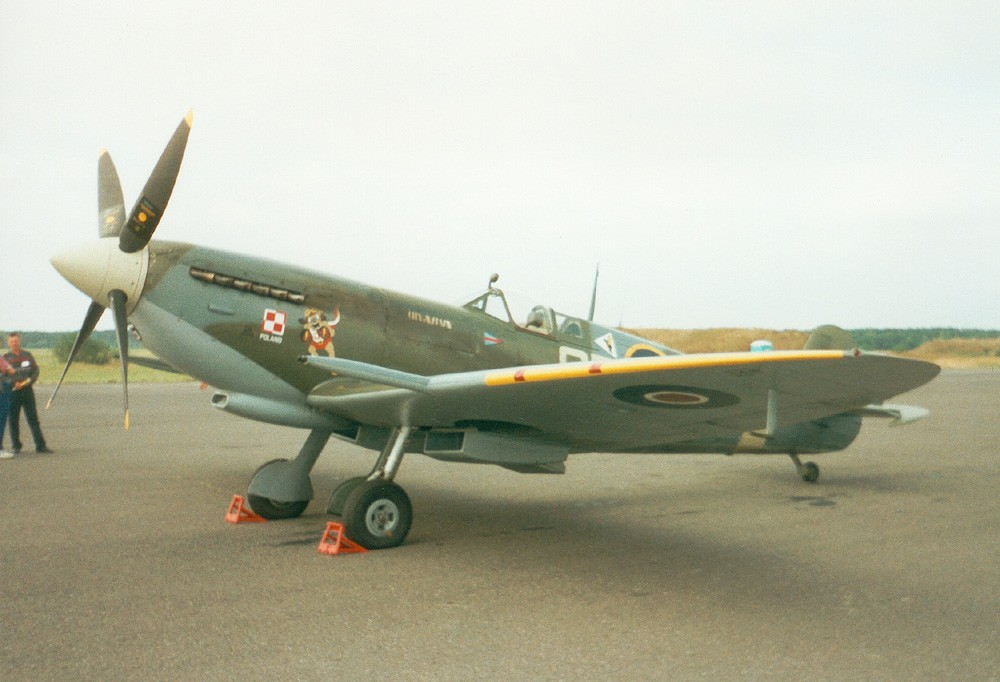
A Spitfire from 316 Squadron

From	To	Aircraft	Version
Feb 1941	Aug 1941	Hawker Hurricane	Mk.I
Jun 1941	Nov 1941	Hawker Hurricane	Mks.IIa, IIb
Oct 1941	Nov 1941	Supermarine Spitfire	Mk.IIa
Oct 1941	Jul 1943	Supermarine Spitfire	Mk.Vb
Mar 1943	Sep 1943	Supermarine Spitfire	Mk.IXc
Sep 1943	Apr 1944	Supermarine Spitfire	LF.Vb
Apr 1944	Dec 1946	North American Mustang	Mk.III
