= No. 315 Polish Fighter Squadron =

No. 315 (City of Dęblin) Polish Fighter Squadron
- 315 Squadron Logo
- Active: 21 January 1941 – 14 January 1947
- Country: United Kingdom
- Allegiance: (Poland) Polish government in exile
- Branch: Royal Air Force
- Role: Fighter Squadron
- Part of: RAF Fighter Command
- Nickname(s): Deblin; Dywizjon Myśliwski "Dębliński"

Commanders
- Notable commanders: Eugeniusz Horbaczewski

Insignia
- Squadron Codes: PK

No. 315 (City of Dęblin) Polish Fighter Squadron (Polish: 315 Dywizjon Myśliwski "Dębliński") was a Polish fighter squadron formed in Great Britain as part of an agreement between the Polish Government in Exile and the United Kingdom in 1941. It was one of 15 squadrons of the Polish Air Force in exile that served alongside the Royal Air Force (RAF) in World War II. It was named after the city of Dęblin, where the main Polish Air Force Academy has been since 1927.

== History ==
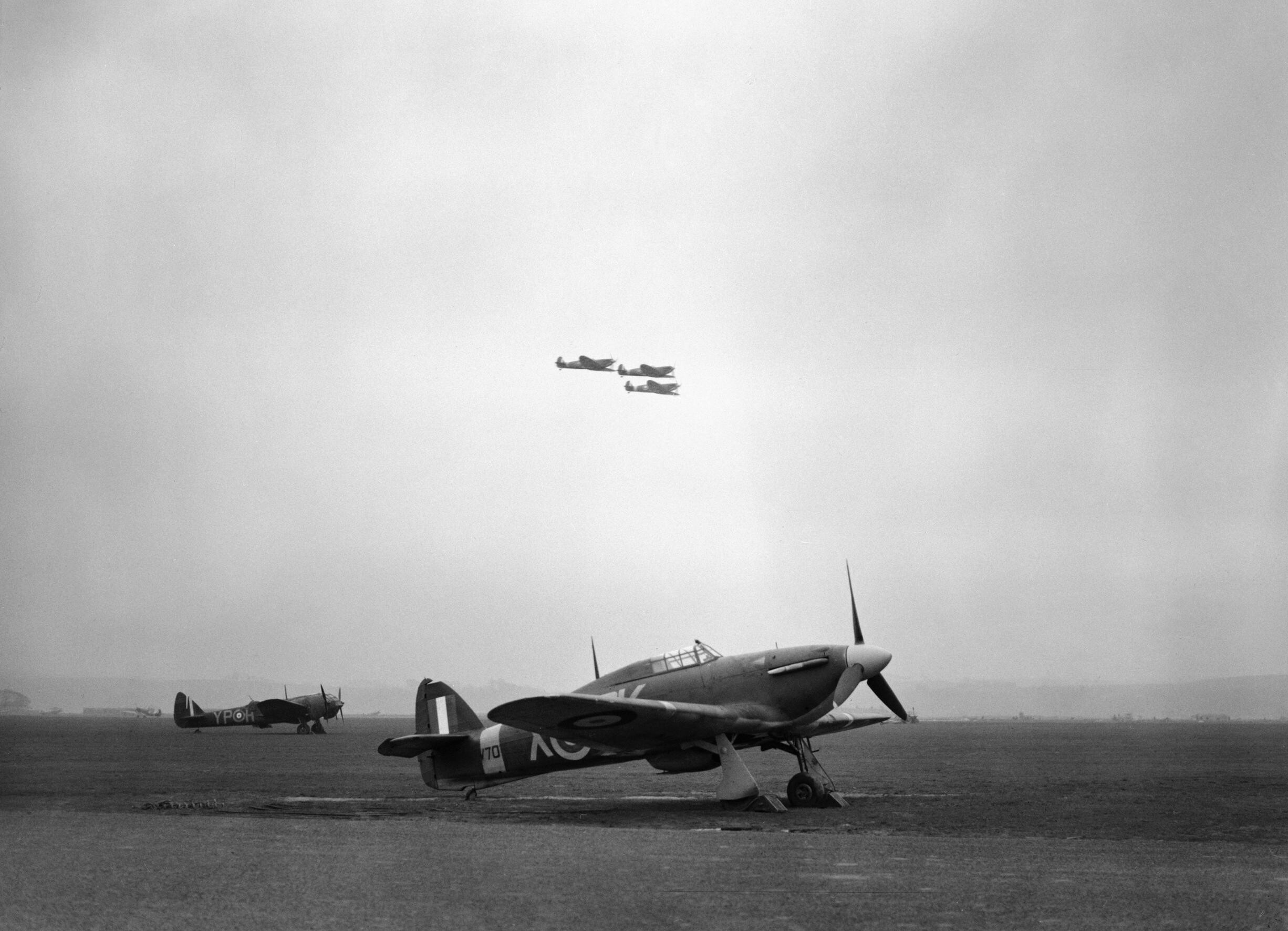
Aircraft of Fighter Command on display for the press at Grangemouth in Scotland, 25 April 1941. In the foreground is a Hawker Hurricane Mk I of No. 315 (Polish) Squadron; in the background a Bristol Blenheim Mk IF of No. 23 Squadron; and overhead, three Supermarine Spitfires of No. 58 Operational Training Unit.

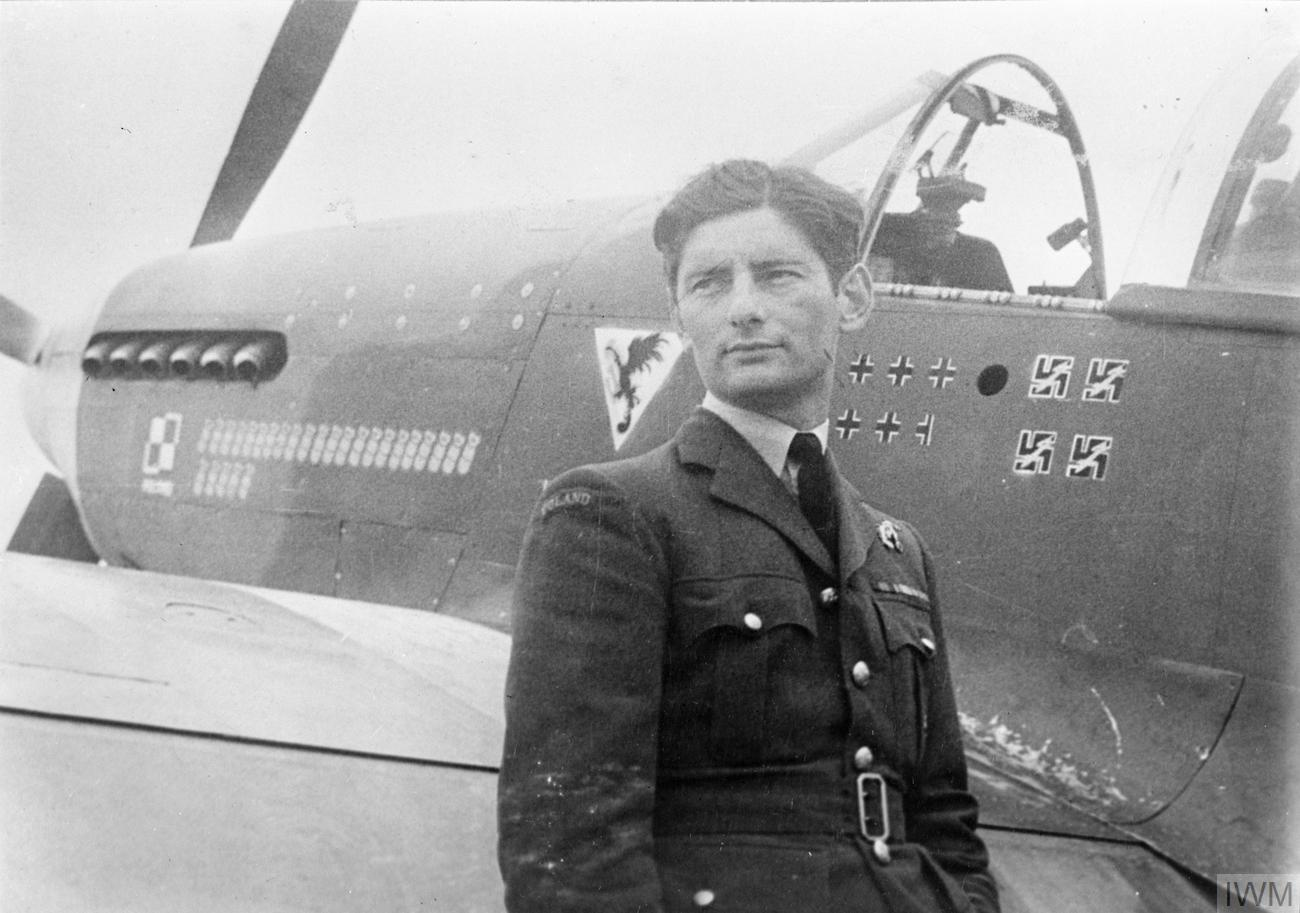
Squadron Leader Eugeniusz Horbaczewski, the CO of the No. 315 Polish Fighter Squadron, standing by his new North American Mustang Mark III, FB387 'PK-G, at Brenzett, Kent. He was shot down and killed on 18 August 1944, after destroying three Focke Wulf Fw 190s to bring his score to 16 and a half victories.

The squadron was formed at RAF Acklington, England, on 21 January 1941. The squadron, equipped with Hurricanes, was moved in March to RAF Speke, Liverpool, where it made frequent patrols over naval convoys as part of No. 9 Group RAF. Before July, when it came under Polish command. No 315 was commanded by Squadron Leader H. D. Cooke.

In July it was moved to RAF Northolt, West London, re-equipped with Spitfires and began to conduct offensive fighter sweeps over occupied Europe. During two operations over France, on 9 August, the squadron achieved its first aircraft claims—two Bf 109s destroyed, three probables and three damaged. The squadron returned to Lancashire in April 1942, located at RAF Woodvale, Sefton. The squadron returned to Northolt in September and resumed operations over France. In June 1943, the squadron was withdrawn to Yorkshire, then to County Down, Northern Ireland in July.

Having returned to England in November, the squadron moved to the south west in April 1944, where it joined No. 133 Wing RAF of the 2nd Tactical Air Force. The squadron was re-equipped with the Mustang Mk III, which the squadron used for the remainder of the war. The squadron formed part of southern England's defence against the V-1 flying bombs and served in the Battle of Normandy.

During a sweep over France on 18 August, 12 Mustangs of No. 315 engaged 60 German fighters of JG2 and JG26, which was in the process of taking off and landing near Beauvais, France. In the ensuing battle, the squadron was credited with 16 victories, 1 probable and 3 damaged for the loss of one pilot, Squadron Leader Eugeniusz Horbaczewski. Conversely, German claims were that 12 aircraft had been lost and that they had themselves shot down 6 aircraft (one of which was claimed to be a Lockheed P-38 Lightning).

The squadron later carried out operations over Germany, Norway and the Netherlands, where the squadron carried out sorties until the end of the war. The squadron claimed 86.33 confirmed victories, 18 probable and 26 damaged. After the war, 315 Squadron remained part of RAF Fighter Command until it was disbanded on 14 January 1947.

== Commanding officers ==
Commanding Officers, 1941–1947
From	To	Name	Remark
Jan 1941	Jun 1941	S/Ldr. H.D. Cooke	British Officer
Jun 1941	Sep 1941	Maj. Stanisław Pietraszkiewicz	
Sep 1941	Nov 1941	Kpt. Władysław Szczęśniewski	
Nov 1941	May 1942	Maj. Stefan Janus, VM, DFC	
May 1942	Oct 1942	Maj. Mieczysław Wiórkiewicz	
Oct 1942	Apr 1943	Kpt. Tadeusz Sawicz	
Apr 1943	Feb 1944	Kpt. Jerzy Popławski, DFC	
Feb 1944	Aug 1944	Kpt. Eugeniusz Horbaczewski, DSO	
Aug 1944	Apr 1945	Kpt. Tadeusz Andersz	
Apr 1945	Feb 1946	Kpt. Władysław Potocki	
Feb 1946	Dec 1946	Kpt. Janusz Siekierski	
Jan 1947	Jan 1947	Tadeusz Tamowicz	

== Aircraft operated ==
Aircraft
From	To	Aircraft	Version
February 1941	July 1941	Hawker Hurricane	Mk.I
July 1941	August 1941	Supermarine Spitfire	Mk.IIa
August 1941	November 1942	Supermarine Spitfire	Mk.Vb
November 1942	June 1943	Supermarine Spitfire	Mk.IX
February 1943	March 1944	Supermarine Spitfire	Mk. Vb; LF.Vc
March 1944	December 1946	North American Mustang	Mk.III

== Notable pilots ==
- Eugeniusz Malczewski
- Francis S. Gabreski
- Janusz Zurakowski
- Eugeniusz Horbaczewski
- Brunon Semmerling

== See also ==
- Air Force of the Polish Army
- List of Royal Air Force aircraft squadrons
- Polish Air Forces in France and Great Britain
- Military history of Poland during World War II
