= I/145 Polish Fighter Squadron =

- Polish: I/145 Polski Dywizjon Myśliwski
- Active: December 1939 – 7 June 1940
- Country: Second Polish Republic
- Type: Fighter Squadron
- Role: Aerial warfare
- Engagements: World War II: Battle of France; Operation Paula

The Polish Fighter Squadron (Polish: I/145 Polski Dywizjon Myśliwski, French: Groupe de Chasse Polonais), also known by its designation GC I/145, was the largest fighter unit of the Polish Air Forces in France. Formed of Polish pilots who evaded capture by the Nazis and the Soviets in the aftermath of the Invasion of Poland of 1939, the unit was initially earmarked to be sent to Finland as part of the aborted plan of Allied intervention in the Winter War. Eventually it took part in the Battle of France defending the French skies along with the allied armies.

== History ==
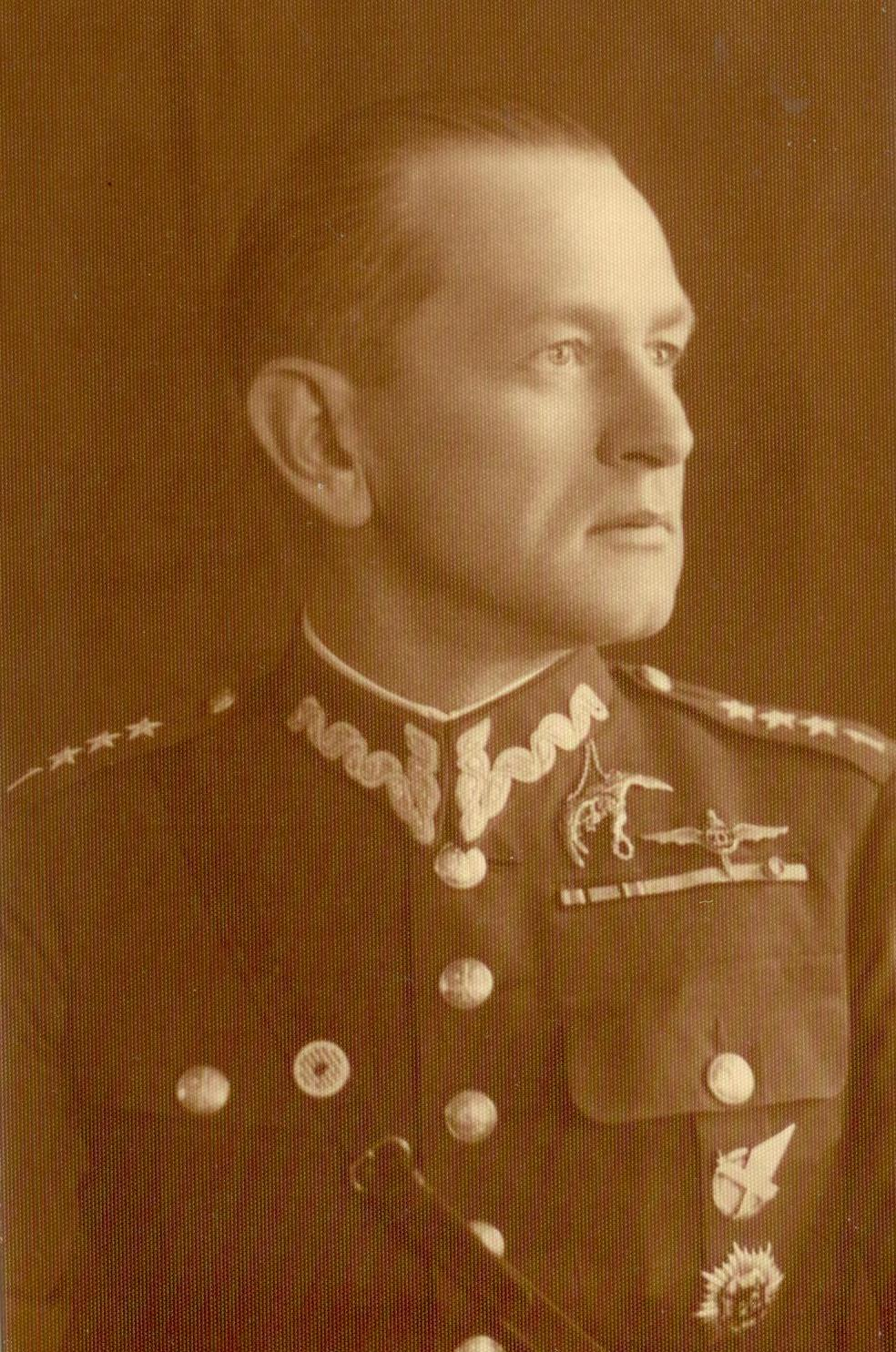
Józef Kępiński

Initially the December 1939 annex to the Franco-Polish Alliance Treaty establishing the Polish Armed Forces in the West proposed the creation of four Polish squadrons:

- 1st 'Warsaw' Fighter Squadron under Lt.Col. Leopold Pamuła
- 2nd 'Kraków-Poznań' Fighter Squadron under Maj. Mieczysław Mümler
- 3rd 'Dęblin' Fighter Squadron under Maj. Józef Kępiński
- 4th Fighter Squadron under Maj. Eugeniusz Wyrwicki

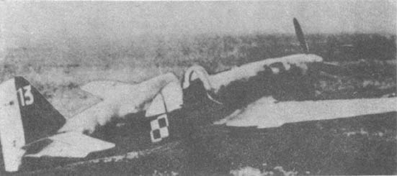
Caudron C.714 plane of GC I/145 in Polish markings (note the distinctive szachownica sign); June 1940

The third squadron started to be formed at Bron near Lyon (modern Lyon–Bron Airport). In early February 1940 the newly created squadron was earmarked to take part in the Allied intervention in the Winter War, together with Polish Independent Highland Brigade. Because of those plans, the new unit was unofficially called the Finnish Squadron. It was equipped with Morane-Saulnier M.S.406 fighters, the workhorses of French aviation, while Caudron C.714 fighters were used as trainers. As soon as the unit was to reach Finland, it was to be re-equipped with Caudron fighters entirely. However, in March 1940 Finland signed a cease-fire with the USSR and the plan was aborted.

Meanwhile, the training of the Polish squadrons in France went slowly and by April only the 3rd 'Dęblin' Sqn. was ready for service. As on 6 April 1940 the French Ministry of Aviation officially created the Polish Fighter Squadron of Warsaw (French: Groupe de Chasse Polonaise de Varsovie), the 3rd was renamed and became the first operational Polish air unit on French soil. By the end of April the unit received the first 20 M.S.406 fighters and started guarding the skies around Lyon.

On 10 of May the German invasion of France started. On that day the Lyon–Bron Airport was struck twice by enemy air raids. The squadron did not suffer any losses and was moved to a reserve airfield at Mions. As the French had no available M.S. 406 fighters to spare, on May 12 the Ministry of Air decided to re-equip the Poles with hopelessly flawed Caudron C.714 fighters waiting in Villacoublay near Paris. The pilots received 35 new planes on May 18 and already the following day suffered the first casualty: Witold Dobrzyński was killed in an air accident. After just 23 sorties, adverse opinion of the fighter was confirmed by front line pilots who expressed concerns that it was seriously underpowered and was no match for contemporary German fighters.

On 25 May, only a week after it was introduced, French Minister of War Guy La Chambre ordered all C.714s to be withdrawn from active service. However, since the French authorities had no other aircraft to offer, the Polish pilots ignored the order and continued to fly the C.714. Despite flying a fighter hopelessly outdated compared to the Messerschmitt Bf 109E, the Polish pilots scored 12 confirmed and three unconfirmed victories in three battles between 8 June and 11 June, losing nine in the air and nine more on the ground. Among the aircraft shot down were four Dornier Do 17 bombers, but also three Messerschmitt Bf 109 and five Messerschmitt Bf 110 fighters.

The emblem of the No. 302 Polish Fighter Squadron featured the designation of the GC I/145, from where most of its initial crew came

On 2 June the unit was moved to Dreux (Vernouillet Airfield) 80 kilometres west of Paris. The following day a flight of three aircraft (Maj. Lionel de Marmier, Lt. Tadeusz Czerwiński and Lt. Aleksander Żukowski) attacked a flight of three Heinkel He 111 bombers taking part in German Operation Paula, shooting down two. Around that time some of the pilots were detached from the squadron and pressed into a newly formed fighter unit created to defend the seat of the Polish government in Exile in Angers. The unit was re-equipped with Bloch MB.152 fighters.

On 5 June the 1st escadrille of the Squadron was attached to GC I/1 under Maj. Robilon at Bretigny, but was returned to Dreux the following day. On 8 June five C.714s led by Maj. Józef Kępiński attacked a group of roughly 20 Messerschmitt Bf 109 fighters. Despite German numerical and technical superiority, the Polish pilots scored one probable kill. The following day the entire Squadron was re-based to Bernay, some 50 kilometres South-West of Rouen. There it joined two other French squadrons: GC II/10 and GC III/10. Around 14:00 the unit, led by Maj. Kępiński left on patrol. Around 15:00 near Vernon it encountered a group of roughly 25 Dornier Do 17 bombers escorted by approximately 20 Messerchmitts. The Germans lost three Bf 109 fighters (Lieutenant Główczyński, Cpr. Parafiński and one downed jointly by Lt. Godlewski and Cpr. Zaniewski). In addition, Capt. Wczelik downed one of the bombers. However, the GC I/145 also suffered losses: three pilots were killed (por. Jan Obuchowski, ppor. Lech Lachowicki-Czechowicz and kpr. Edward Uchto), one wounded (por. Julian Kowalski), while four more were forced to land away from the home base. Altogether the unit lost four pilots and seven fighters.

On 10 June the squadron moved back to Dreux. En route a flight of 12 planes under Maj. de Marmier attacked a group of 15 Dornier Do 17 bombers and 10 Bf 109 fighters. Ppor. Jerzy Czerniak scored two Dorniers, ppor. Aleksander Żukowski and por. Tadeusz Czerwiński scored one each. However, Józef Kępiński, the commanding officer of the squadron was heavily wounded, the unit also lost three damaged and one aircraft destroyed. The following day the pilots were moved further away to Sermaize, some 15 kilometres south of Etampes and two days later to Châteauroux, where some of the losses were replaced by Bloch MB.152 fighters. The command over GC I/145 was taken over by Capt. Piotr Łaguna.

As the situation of the French Army was becoming increasingly desperate, on 17 June it was decided to split the Polish fighter unit and attach it to two French units badly needing reinforcements. Eight pilots under Capt. Wczelik joined the GC I/1, while eight under Lt. Wilczewski joined the GC I/8 (both squadrons equipped with Dewoitine D.520). The following day a flight of three planes (WO Delagay, Capt. Wczelik and LSgt Markiewicz) shot down a lone Heinkel He 111. This was the last victory of the Polish unit during the French campaign. The following day the pilots were evacuated by cars to the port of La Rochelle, from where they were transported to England. Thirteen pilots of the GC I/145 then joined the newly created No. 302 Polish Fighter Squadron fighting alongside the Royal Air Force.

== Pilots ==
- CO - Maj Józef Kępiński (wounded 10 June 1940)
- deputy CO - Capt. Piotr Łaguna († 27 June 1941)
- French liaison - Maj Lionel de Marmier
- Technical officer - Capt. Adam Jaworski

1st escadrille

Capt. Antoni Wczelik - dowódca († 14 June 1942)
Lt. Jan Obuchowski († 9 June 1940)
Lt. Tadeusz Czerwiński († 22 August 1942)
Lt. Julian Kowalski
2Lt. Marian Łukaszewicz († 23 November 1941)
2Lt. Bronisław Skibiński
2Lt. Aleksander Żukowski († 18 October 1940)
2Lt. Jerzy Czerniak († 9 August 1941)
2Lt. Jerzy Godlewski
2Lt. Eugeniusz Fiedorczuk († 15 August 1942)
WO. Lucjan Szempliński († 13 January 1944)
WO. Antoni Markiewicz
WO. Marian Wędzik
Cpl. Mieczysław Parafiński († 26 February 1941)
Cpl. Piotr Zaniewski
Cpl. Edward Uchto († 9 June 1940)

2nd escadrille

Capt. Juliusz Frey
Lt. Wacław Wilczewski
Lt. Zdzisław Zadroziński
Lt. Robert Janota
2Lt. Witold Dobrzyński
2Lt. Witold Łanowski
2Lt. Czesław Główczyński
2Lt. Leon Jaugsch
2Lt. Lech Lachowicki-Czechowicz († 9 June 1940)
2Lt. Bolesław Gładych
2Lt. Marian Szalewicz
WO. Edward Paterek († 27 March 1941)
WO. Jan Palak
WO. Antoni Siudak († 6 October 1940)
Cpl. Andrzej Niewiara († 9 August 1941)
Cpl. Ernest Watolski
Cpl. Jerzy Zieliński († 26 May 1942)
