= Józef Kępiński =

Józef Kępiński may refer to:

- Józef Kępiński (aviator) (1900–1964), officer of the Polish Air Force
- Józef Kępiński (chemist) (1917–1981), rector of the Szczecin University of Technology
