= Kępiński =

Kępiński (femine: Kępińska; plural: Kępińscy) is a Polish surname meaning 'related to Kępno County'. Notable people with the surname include:

- Antoni Kępiński (1918–1972), Polish psychiatrist and philosopher
- Elżbieta Kępińska (born 1937), Polish film actress
- Józef Kępiński (disambiguation), multiple people
- Lydia Képinski, Québécoise indie pop singer
- Miro Kepinski (born 1980), Polish film composer

== Other ==
- Kepínski (crater)
- Powiat kępiński, unit of territorial administration in Greater Poland Voivodeship
- Umowa kępińska, 1282 agreement between Wielkopolska and Pomerania

== See also ==
- Kempinski (surname)
