= Kempinski (surname) =

Kempinski, Kempiński (feminine: Kempińska, plural: Kempińscy), sometimes Kempinsky, is a Polish and Jewish surname. Notable people with the surname include:

- A. Kempinsky (1918–1972), Polish psychiatrist and philosopher
- Berthold Kempinski (1843–1910), Polish hotelier
- Charlie Kempinska (1938–2019), American football player
- Gerhard Kempinski (1904–1947), German-born actor
- Robert Kempiński (born 1977), Polish chess grandmaster
- Tom Kempinski (born 1938), English playwright and actor

== Fictional ==
- Leonard Kempinski, character from the British ITV soap opera, Emmerdale
- Rolf Kempinski, pseudonym for Magnus Michaeli of IFA Wartburg

== See also ==
- Kępiński
