= Plymax =

Plymax is a composite material. It consists of a thin sheet of metal, such as aluminium, copper, or duralumin, that is bonded to a thicker sheet of plywood, giving it strength and rigidity at a relatively low weight.

Plymax was introduced during the 1920s, quickly spreading throughout Europe and the world by the 1930s. The material has been extensively used in the aviation industry; various military aircraft throughout the 1930s and 1940s made use of the material. Plymax was also adopted by the automotive industry, being used on the bodies of several cars, such as the 1931 Triumph Super 9 and the articulated body of the Trojan Tasker. It has also found use within the construction industry for various large fixtures, typically partitions and doors, as well as by furniture manufacturers for various home furnishings.

== History ==
Plymax first emerged during the early 1920s, one of the first compositions was a copper-faced plywood, manufactured by Luterma. The term 'Plymax' was a registered trademark of Venesta, which introduced the material to the British market. During the 1930s, the material was being extensively used within the architectural and construction sectors, where items such as partitions, doors, cubicals, counters, and stalls were constructed and installed throughout large buildings such as schools, hospitals, offices, and factories.

According to Venesta, the typical metals used in Plymax are steel and aluminium; however, alternatives have included copper, bronze, stainless steel and others. Key qualities of the material are its rigidity and relatively light weight. By itself, each metal sheet lacks stiffness, when paired to the plywood to become a composite, it becomes far more rigid, being similar in principle to that of a steel girder in that the vertical web contributes little to the overall strength in comparison to the flanges set at the top and bottom, but plays a critical role in the rigidity.

Due to its high strength-to-weight ratio, the material attracted the attention of various aircraft manufacturers. One notable example of its use was on the Morane-Saulnier M.S.406, a Second World War-era fighter aircraft that was extensively used by the French Air Force. Various aircraft would adopt the material for portions of their design; in one case, the interior floor of the Handley Page Halifax was composed of Plymax.

Plymax was reportedly once a popular material for furniture use, although its use has somewhat diminished following the arrival of new types of processed woods.
