= Józef Kępiński (aviator) =

Józef Kępiński ([juzɛf kɛ̃piɲski]; 12 September 1900 – 26 March 1964) was a Polish aviator and officer of the Polish Air Force and the Royal Air Force during World War II. Among other posts he was a commanding officer of the 111th Fighter Escadrille in Poland and the I/145 Polish Fighter Squadron in France, as well as the Air Training Centre.

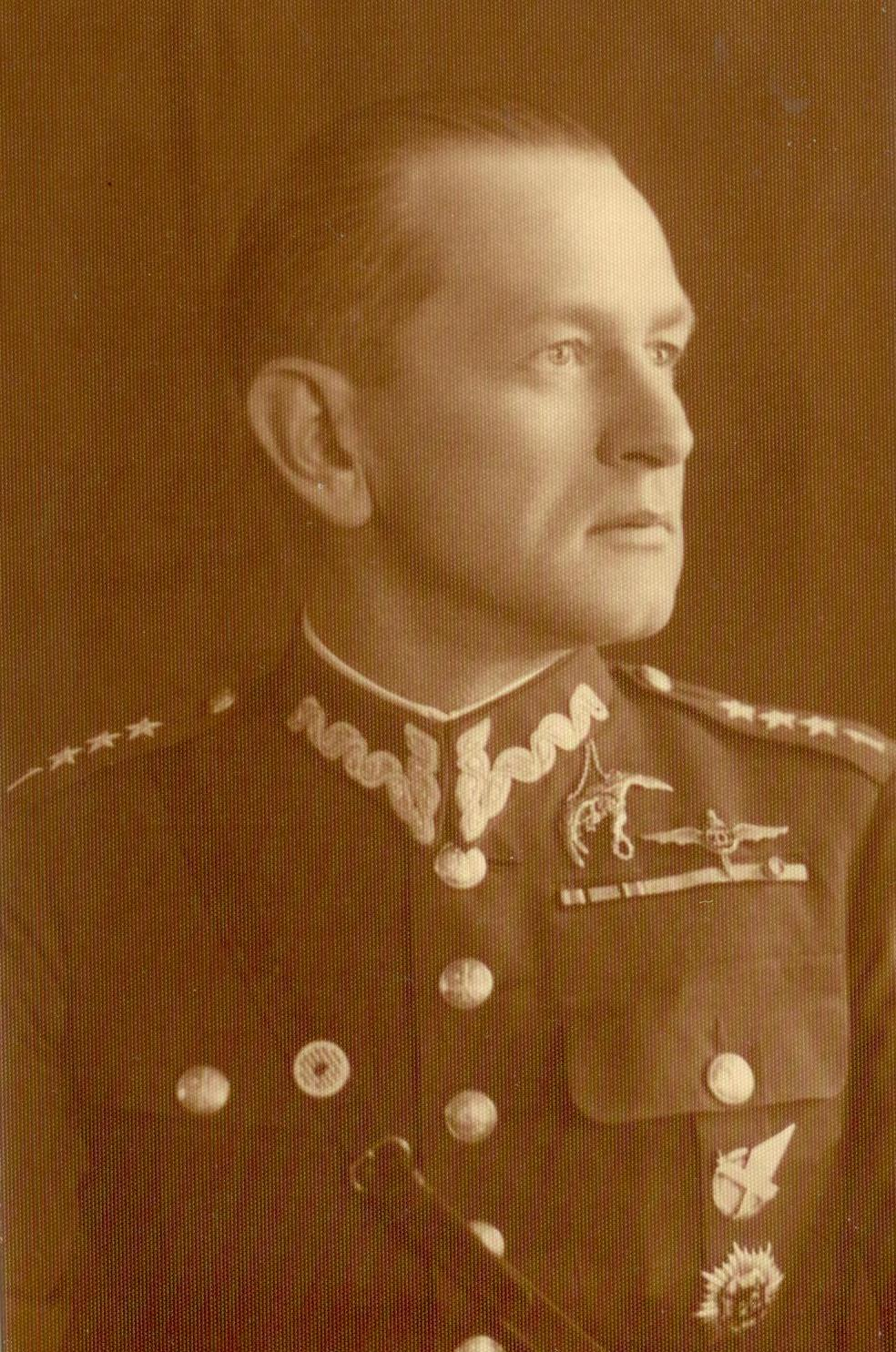
Józef Kępiński

== Before World War II ==
He was born in Stryków near Łódź.

Józef Kępiński joined the renascent Polish Army on 1 November 1918. Together with the 1st Chevau-léger Regiment he took part in the Polish-Ukrainian War. Withdrawn from the front for training he returned to front-line service with the rank of podporucznik, in time to take part in the Polish-Bolshevist War of 1920. After the armistice and the Peace of Riga he remained in the army and in 1926 he volunteered for the Polish Air Force. He trained as a fighter pilot in various escadrilles and eventually joined the 121 Fighter Escadrille (later renamed the 111th), flying Spad 61 fighters.

An excellent and decorated pilot, in 1932 he became the commanding officer of his escadrille and the following year was promoted to the rank of captain. In 1936 he became the commanding officer of the IV Fighter Squadron (comprising 113th and 114th Fighter Escadrilles). Promoted to the rank of major, in 1937 Kępiński was dispatched to Dęblin, where he headed the Air Training Centre (Polish: Centrum Wyszkolenia Lotnictwa), the predecessor to Polish Air Force Academy.

== World War II ==
After the start of the Invasion of Poland he headed an ad-hoc air defence of Dęblin. Ordered to evacuate from Poland after the Soviet invasion, he fled to Romania. Interned, he managed to escape and reach France, where he joined the Polish Air Forces in France and Great Britain. Dispatched to Lyon-Bron, he became the first commanding officer of the I/145 Polish Fighter Squadron.

During the Battle of France, despite flying the obsolete Morane-Saulnier M.S.406 and Caudron C.714 fighters, the Polish unit under Kępiński's command achieved 11 victories in the first three days of the Battle of France. However, on 10 June 1940 Kępiński led his unit against a German bombing raid south of Dreux, covered by approximately 12 Messerschmitt Bf 109 fighters. Blinded by the sun, Kępiński became separated from his unit and mistook the enemy formation for his own. Heavily wounded, with his lung shot through, he managed to crash-land his damaged airplane at Dreux airfield. He spent the remainder of the campaign in hospitals in Chartres and Vichy.

In October 1940, he escaped from Vichy France, passing through Spain and Portugal to reach Great Britain. Unable to serve as a fighter pilot due to his earlier wounds, he served on various rear-area posts for the rest of World War II flying Percival Proctor, Miles Master and Airspeed Oxford planes. He eventually rose to the Polish rank of lieutenant colonel (podpułkownik) and the British rank of group captain.

== After World War II ==
After the war he returned to Communist-held Poland and continued his military service. Forced to retire in 1949, during the Stalinist repressions against pre-war Polish officers, he was placed on a proscription list and spent the remainder of his life doing menial jobs and working as an ordinary worker in Warsaw. He died 26 March 1964 in Warsaw and was buried at the Powązki Military Cemetery.
