= Tadeusz Czerwiński =

Polish sports shooter (born 1964)

Personal information
- Nationality: Polish
- Born: 30 September 1964 (age 60); Warsaw, Poland

Sport
- Sport: Sports shooting

Tadeusz Czerwiński (born 30 September 1964) is a Polish sports shooter. He competed at the 1992 Summer Olympics and the 1996 Summer Olympics.
