= Morane-Saulnier M.S.406 =

French fighter aircraft

M.S.406
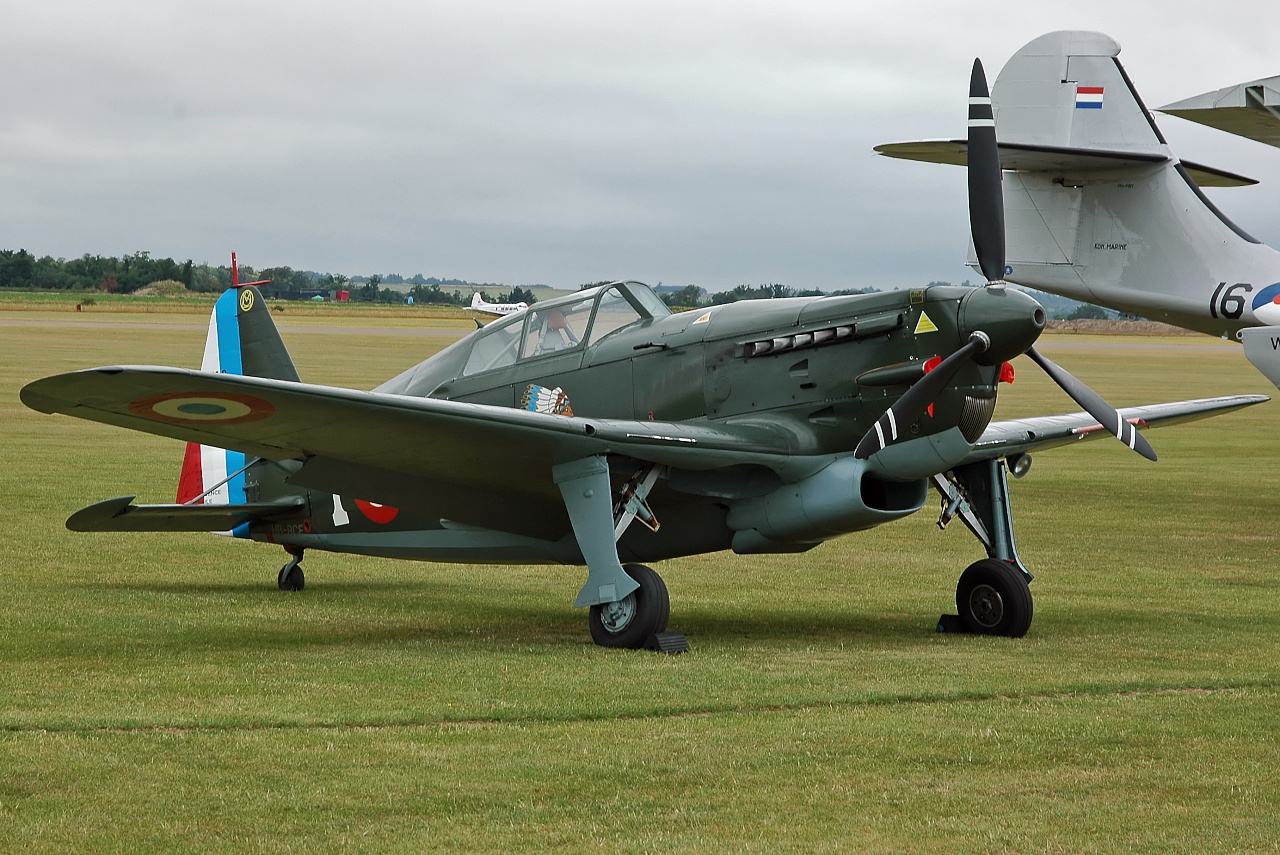
- Morane-Saulnier D-3801 (GC LaFayette)

General information
- Type: Fighter
- Manufacturer: Morane-Saulnier
- Status: Retired
- Primary users: French Air Force Finnish Air Force; Swiss Air Force; Turkish Air Force
- Number built: 1,176

History
- Introduction date: 1938
- First flight: 8 August 1935 (M.S.405)

The Morane-Saulnier M.S.406 is a French fighter aircraft developed and manufactured by Morane-Saulnier starting in 1938. It was France's most numerous fighter during the Second World War and one of only two French designs to exceed 1,000 in number. At the beginning of the war, it was one of only two French-built aircraft capable of 400 km/h (250 mph) – the other being the Potez 630.

In response to a requirement for a fighter issued by the French Air Force in 1934, Morane-Saulnier built a prototype, designated MS.405, of mixed materials. This had the distinction of being the company's first low-wing monoplane, as well as the first to feature an enclosed cockpit, and the first design with a retracting undercarriage. The entry to service of the M.S.406 to the French Air Force in early 1939 represented the first modern fighter aircraft to be adopted by the service. Although a sturdy and highly manoeuvrable fighter aircraft, it was considered underpowered and weakly armed when compared to its contemporaries and the M.S.406 was outperformed by the Messerschmitt Bf 109E during the Battle of France.

The type was capable of holding its own during the so-called Phoney War from September 1939 to 10 May 1940. Upon the invasion of France in May 1940, approximately 400 Moranes were lost. Out of these, around 150 were lost to enemy fighters and ground fire, while another 100 aircraft were destroyed on the ground during enemy air raids; the remainder were deliberately destroyed by French military personnel to prevent the fighters from falling into German hands. French M.S.406 squadrons had achieved 191 confirmed victories, along with another 83 probable victories. Limited production of the type continued in France for sometime after the Armistice of 22 June 1940 under German supervision.

The M.S.406 was exported to a range of customers. Out of 160 aeroplanes ordered by Poland, none had reached Polish territory before the outbreak of war, with the first consignment sent on 29 August 1939. Of particular note was its service in the hands of Finnish and Swiss air forces; both operators chose to develop indigenous derivatives of the M.S.406, such as the Finnish Mörkö-Morane). By the end of the war, the majority of M.S.406s and its derivatives were out of service, having been rendered obsolete by rapid advances in fighter aircraft technology. Its final use was as an advanced trainer aircraft in Finland, prior to the last examples of the type being scrapped during 1952.

== Design and development ==
=== Origins ===
During 1934, the Service Technique de l'Aéronautique (Aeronautical Technical Service) of the French Air Force issued the "C1 design" requirement for a new and modern single-seat interceptor fighter. Envisaged as a monoplane with a retractable undercarriage, the prospective fighter aircraft was to serve as a replacement for the Dewoitine D.371, Dewoitine D.500, and Loire 46 aircraft. Amongst the various aviation companies who took interest in the specification, to which the potential for a large production order was attached, was French aircraft manufacturer Morane-Saulnier.

The company's design team quickly projected that a low-wing monoplane design would be capable of delivering the desired level of performance; other features were to include an enclosed cockpit, a variable-pitch propeller and landing flaps. It was decided to submit their own response to the requirement, the M.S.405; work on the design was headed by the firm's Engineer-in-Chief, Paul-René Gauthier. The shape and basic configuration of the M.S.405 were hotly contested, particularly between 'traditional' advocates of biplane aircraft and 'modern' monoplane supporters.

The MS.405 was a low-wing monoplane of mixed construction, with fabric-covered wooden tail, with a bonded metal–wood material (Plymax) skin fixed to duralumin tubing. Plymax consisted of a thin sheet of duralumin bonded to a thicker sheet of plywood. Morane-Saulnier had a long history of producing warplanes dating back to the pre-First World War years but in the inter-war period, they had concentrated on civil designs. The aircraft was a departure for them, being their first low-wing monoplane, first with an enclosed cockpit and first with retracting landing gear. Prior to this, their most modern designs were fixed-gear parasol monoplanes.

=== Into flight ===
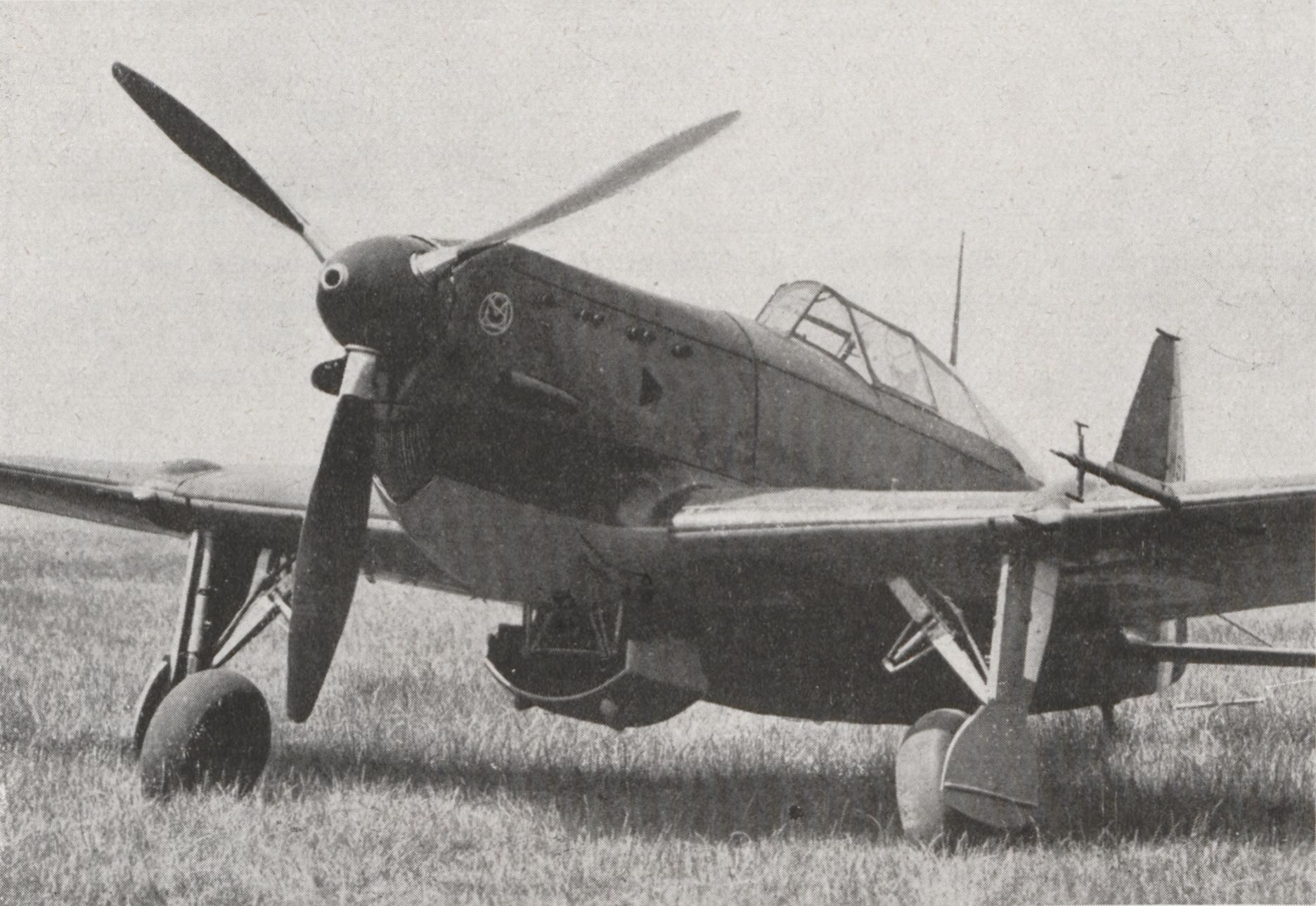
MS.405 in 1938.

The new 641.3 kW (860 hp) Hispano-Suiza 12Ygrs engine driving a two-pitch Chauvière propeller powered the first M.S405-1 prototype, which flew on 8 August 1935. First flown by French aerobatic pilot Michel Détroyat, the prototype demonstrated the type's favourable flying characteristics from the onset. Early test flights were flown with a fixed undercarriage, which was replaced by a retractable counterpart later on. After 80 hours of test flights, in January 1936, the prototype was delivered with all military equipment fitted to CEMA at Villacoublay to participate in service trials. On 19 June 1937, the first prototype generated substantial publicity when Détroyat flew it from Paris to Brussels in Belgium, to be displayed at the Brussels Aeronautical Exhibition.

Development of the M.S.405 proceeded fairly slowly; testing revealed the need to modify the wing planform and dihedral, while the Chauvière-built propeller was replaced by a Levasseur-built counterpart. The second M.S.405-2 prototype with a 671.1 kW (900 hp) Hispano-Suiza 12Ycrs engine did not make its first flight until 20 January 1937, almost a year and a half behind the first prototype. The second prototype was able to attain a speed of 443 km/h (275 mph) during testing. During July 1937, both prototypes were flown to the Paris Air Show. On 29 July 1938, the second prototype was lost along with its pilot. During March 1937, having been suitably impressed with its performance, an initial order was placed for the construction of 16 pre-production prototypes, which were to incorporate the design improvements that had been made upon the previous version.

As a consequence of various changes made between the prototypes and the pre-production aircraft, the name M.S.406 was adopted for the type. On 3 February 1938, the first pre-production aircraft made its first flight; during December 1938, the final pre-production M.S.406 was delivered. The pre-production aircraft served to build up experience of manufacturing and testing of the type in advance of production M.S.406s. These 15 aircraft were used for various purposes, such as the third and tenth which served as examples for subcontractors Société nationale des constructions aéronautiques de l'ouest (SNCAO) and Société nationale des constructions aéronautiques du Midi (SNCAM), and the twelfth and thirteenth functioned as prototypes for the Swiss D-3801 and D-3800 export models. Variants of the aircraft, including some which later entered mass production, were first represented amongst the pre-production aircraft.

The two main changes of the M.S. 406 were the inclusion of a new wing structure which saved weight and the fitting of a retractable radiator, underneath the fuselage. Powered by the production 641.3 kW (860 hp) HS 12Y-31 engine, the new design was over 8 km/h (5 mph) faster than the earlier M.S.405 model. Designed to reach speeds of 489 km/h (304 mph), examples were tested without encountering any difficulty in reaching up to 730 km/h (454 mph) in a dive. Armament consisted of a 20 mm (0.787 in) Hispano-Suiza HS.9 or 404 cannon with 60 rounds in the V of the engine, fired through the propeller hub and two 7.5 mm (0.295 in) MAC 1934 machine guns (one in each wing, each with 300 rounds). A weakness of the MAC 1934 was its operation at high altitudes. It was found that at altitudes over 6,000 m (20,000 ft), the guns had a tendency to freeze. Heaters were added to the guns for high-altitude use.

=== Further development ===
Beyond the base M.S.406 design, the development of improved variants and derivatives were emphasised even as mass production of the type was still being established. Perhaps the most significant of these was the M.S.410, which was developed on the basis of very early combat experience gathered during autumn 1939. This model had four MAC 1934 machine guns with 550 rounds per gun, all of which were heated by warm air fed via a heat exchanger placed on the port engine exhausts. The cockpit had a modified windscreen to accommodate a new reflector sight arrangement, as well the adoption of electropneumatic controls of the armaments and provisions for the carriage of under-wing auxiliary fuel tanks.

Following the completion of a pair of prototypes, during February 1940, the French government issued an order authorising the bulk upgrading of 500 M.S.406 fighters to the better armed, stronger and faster (509 km/h (316 mph) M.S.410 configuration. It took 15 days to convert each fighter but conversions were stopped in May 1940 to put every available combat aircraft into action during the Battle of France against invading German forces. Only five complete production M.S.410 aircraft, along with 150 pairs of the revised wings, had been completed by this point.

=== Production ===
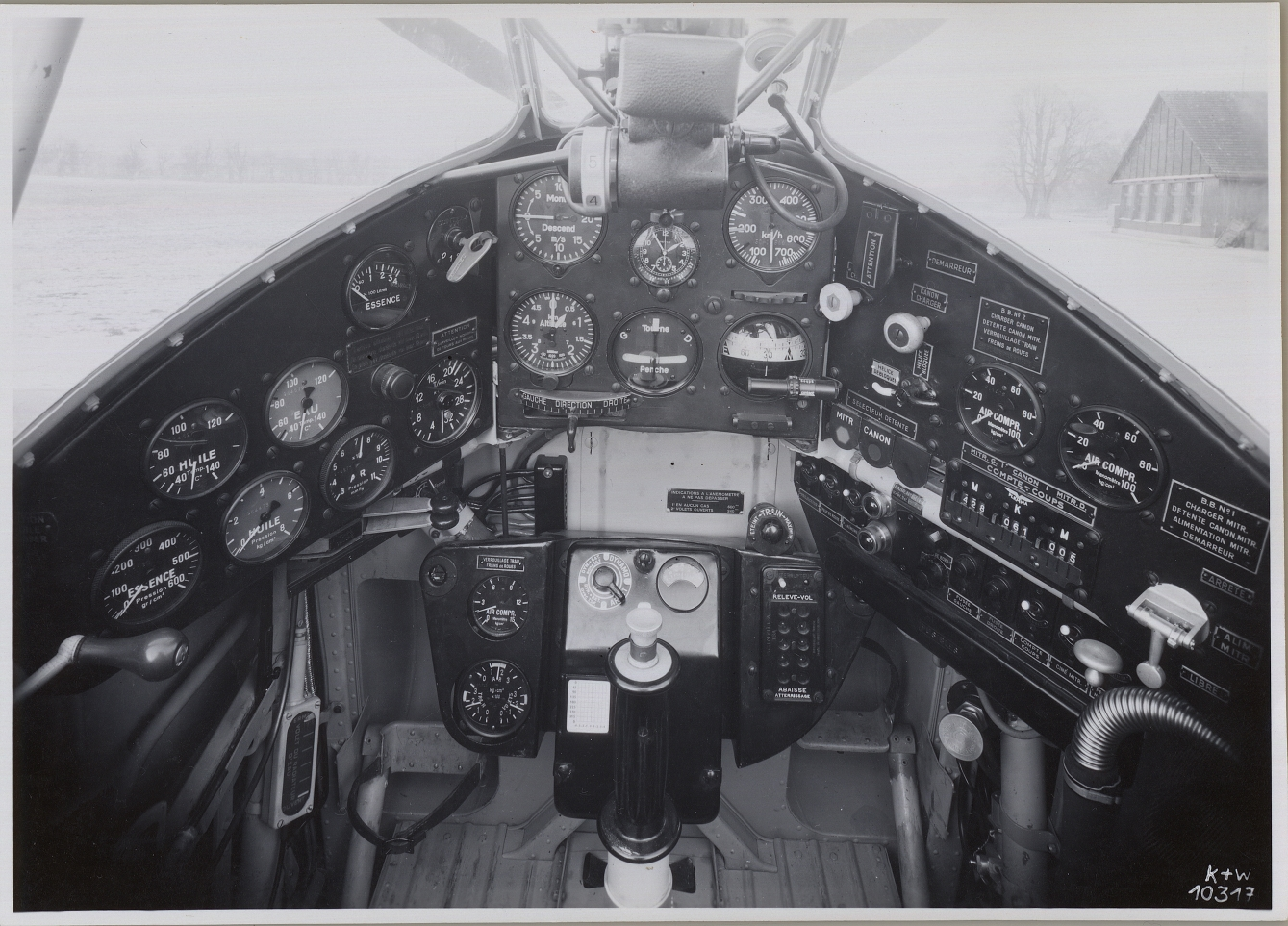
Aircraft cockpit instruments (Swiss D.3800 variant)

During the late 1930s, there was a growing perception that a major conflict between Germany and France was not only looming but increasingly unavoidable. As part of its rearmament, the French Air Force placed an order for 1,000 M.S406 airframes during March 1938. Morane-Saulnier was unable to produce anywhere near this number at their own factory, thus a second assembly line was established at the nationalized factories of SNCAO at St. Nazaire in order to produce the type. In April 1937, an initial order for 50 SNCAO-built M.S.406 fighters was placed; in August 1937, a follow-up order for 80 aircraft was issued. In April 1938, as a component of the French Air Force's Plan V, a large order for 825 M.S.406 was placed with the various nationalised French aircraft industries.

During late 1938, production of the M.S.406 commenced; the first production example performed its maiden flight on 29 January 1939. Production was initially quite slow; only 18 aircraft were produced at Puteaux, along with 10 fighters built by SNCAO. Deliveries were hampered more by the slow deliveries of engines than by the lack of airframes; while efforts were made to correct this, according to Botquin, the engine shortage was present throughout the manufacturing programme. By April 1939, the production lines were delivering six aircraft per day and when war broke out on 3 September 1939, the rate production had risen to 11 aircraft per day; at this time, 535 M.S.406s had entered squadron service. According to aviation author Gaston Botquin, the rate of production of the type was comparable to the initial model of the British Hawker Hurricane.

Production had reached a high-point of 147 M.S.406 aircraft during August 1939, before declining as manufacturing efforts were progressively re-directed towards other aircraft, such as the Lioré et Olivier LeO 45. Manufacturing of the M.S.406 was wound down during March 1940, by which point the original order for 1,000 fighters had been delivered in full to the French Air Force, along with a further 77 aircraft which had been constructed for foreign users (30 fighters for Finland and 45 for Turkey). Additional M.S.406 orders that had been placed for Lithuania and Poland were cancelled with the outbreak of the war.

According to Botquin, the M.S.406 had attracted considerable foreign attention during the late 1930s, and had shown signs of commercial promise early on. During 1937, negotiations were underway between France and Belgium to undertake the licensed production of the type by Belgian aircraft manufacturer Avions Fairey for both the Belgian and French air forces, but these ultimately came to nothing. Instead, the first major export customer was Switzerland who, in September 1938, acquired a manufacturing licence for the type to be manufactured by Swiss firm Fabrique fédérale d'avions in Emmen.

== Operational history ==
=== In French service ===
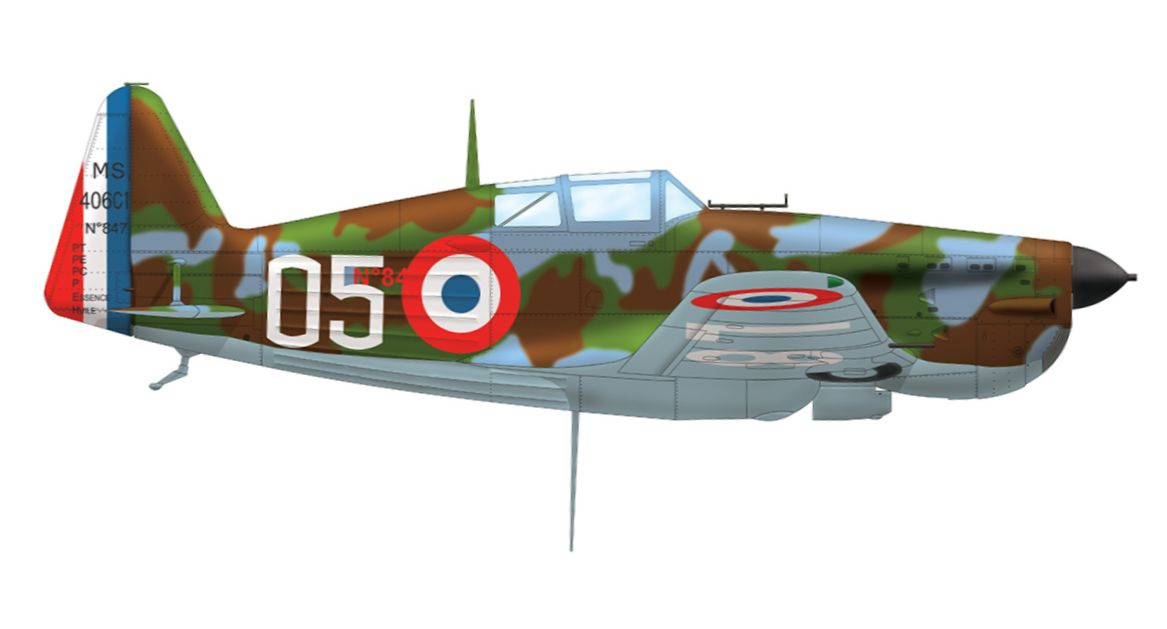
Morane-Saulnier MS.406 N° 847, white 05 of Groupe de Chasse I/6, May 1940

During May 1938, the 2nd Escadrille of the 7th Groupe de Chasse at Reims conducted operational testing of the type using a handful of pre-production M.S.406 aircraft. In spite of some accidents experienced, pilots were commonly pleased with the type's performance; in response to the accidents, improvements such as the strengthening of the undercarriage and the cabin hood were implemented during mid-1939. In spite of complaints regarding the forward fuselage exterior covering and motor attachments, no corrective actions were implemented to address these concerns.

Production M.S.406s quickly followed the earlier examples. Between December 1938 and January 1939, the 6th Escadre exchanged its obsolete Loire 46 fighters for the type, while other units rapidly followed. By Bastille Day of that year, sufficient production M.S.406 aircraft had been delivered to enable the type to perform the Paris fly-past on 14 July 1939. Overall, the M.S.406 equipped 16 Groupes de Chasse and three Escadrilles, stationed in both mainland France and across its overseas colonies; of these, 12 of the Groupes saw action against the Luftwaffe.

On 23 August 1939, in response to the diplomatic crisis emerging over the Invasion of Poland, all French Air Force units were mobilised as part of preparations to be ready for imminent combat operations. Various M.S.406-equipped units were deployed along the border with Germany stretching between Luxembourg and Switzerland, intended to support the sizable ground elements of the French Army from the air. During the Phoney War opening phase of the Second World War, a time of relatively low combat intensity, the type's activities focused upon air defence operations with the aim of countering the prolific aerial reconnaissance and probing activities of small groups of Axis-aligned fighters coming over the border, in addition to escorting friendly reconnaissance aircraft. Throughout the Phoney War, a total of 10,119 fighter missions were reportedly flown over the Army Zones on the border, around half of which being flown by M.S.406 fighters.

During the Phoney War, isolated skirmishes occurred between the M.S.406 and fighters of the Luftwaffe, particularly early models of the Messerschmitt Bf 109. For 32 claimed 'kills' and 16 'probables' achieved by M.S.406s, including against the Bf 109, 13 were lost in combat along with 33 more that were lost within the border zone under vague circumstances. According to Botquin, by this stage, the weaknesses of the M.S.406 were already apparent, such as the lack of armouring, frequent gun-jamming, inadequate firepower, slow responsiveness of the guns, unreliable radio units, very high rate of engine wear, corrosion of rudder components, cabin glazing breaking under air pressure during certain manoeuvres, loss of exterior panels due to screws deteriorating rapidly, and the lack of rear-view mirrors.

Efforts to fully replace the M.S.406 with a more capable fighter failed to occur prior to the end of the Phoney War on 10 May 1940, the month in which a massive full-scale invasion by German forces of mainland France commenced, resulting in the Battle of France. On the eve of the invasion, a total of 10 Groupes de Chasse were equipped with M.S.406 fighters, along with a number of defensive units which were almost exclusively equipped with either the M.S.406 or Bloch MB.152 aircraft.

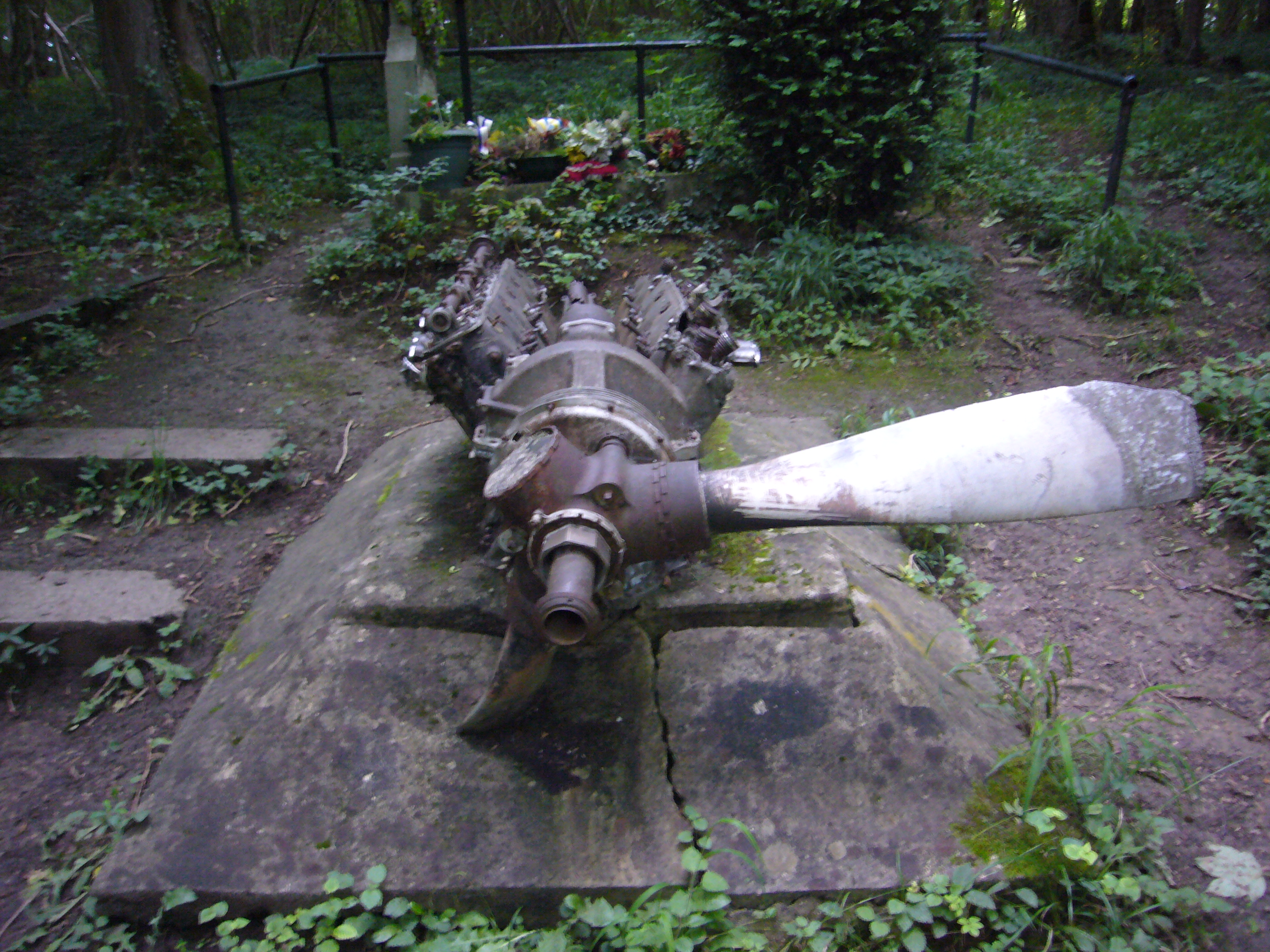
Monument in Longpont (Aisne) where a French pilot Lieutenant André Monty was shot down in June 1940 by three Bf 109s and buried among his MS.406 remains.

During the relentless fighting that followed, Allied forces suffered a high rate of attrition and were unable to keep up with the level of damage being sustained. Of the M.S.406s that saw action against the Germans, heavy losses were incurred; reportedly, 150 aircraft were lost in action while a further 250–300 fighters were recorded as having been lost through other causes. The rapid advance of German forces led to repeated retreats and abandonment of bases, rendering most repair and replacement efforts disorganized, along with ground crews often having to destroy large numbers of their own fighter aircraft on the ground to prevent their capture. The decision to employ small groups of French fighters against larger German formations was mostly ineffective against bombers and often costly.

Though the aircraft was very manoeuvrable and could withstand high amounts of battle damage, in combat against enemy fighters the M.S.406 often experienced mixed results. While there were isolated incidents of favourable results being achieved with the type even against the capable Bf 109 — 100 km/h faster than the Morane — the 406 was usually outclassed by the Luftwaffe fighters. The story of GC III/7 was typical. On 15 May, nine Moranes of this fighter unit encountered a dozen Bf 109s over Mézières. The Messerschmitts stayed a few thousand feet above their French opponents and dived in pairs to attack, with a single firing pass, before climbing back and then repeating the attack. Three M.S.406 went spinning down in flames; a fourth Morane, riddled with bullets, crash-landed at Soissons and was wrecked, while a fifth pilot was wounded in the head by splinters, forcing him to land. Six days later, on 21 May, 17 Moranes of the same unit intercepted 50 Dorniers over Compiègne, escorted by as many Bf 109s. Before the Morane could close in to open fire, the Messerschmitts jumped them and shot down four Moranes almost at once. Two more were too badly damaged to be repaired. On their side, the French pilots claimed two Bf 109s. The M.S.406 holds the unfortunate distinction of being the least effective French fighter in service during the Battle of France, which Botquin suggests was due to its relatively low firepower. On 24 June 1940, a M.S.406 flown by Sous Lieutenant Marchelidon of G.C.1/2 scored the French Air Force's last kill in the conflict. Botquin stated of the aircraft: "it would be pointless to pretend, as was often done during the war for propaganda purposes, that the M.S.406 was the finest fighter in the world...but it was certainly a pleasant machine to fly with no vices and great maneuverability".

In the aftermath of the armistice, only a single Vichy unit, GC. 1/7, was equipped with the M.S.406. According to Botquin, the deployment of the type from this point onward reflected the fighter's relative obsolescence; it was reduced to relatively minor roles, being used mainly for training purposes in mainland France. A handful of Syrian M.S.406 aircraft flew to Egypt, joining up with the Royal Air Force (RAF) and the Free French Air Force, continuing to be operated there until they became unserviceable. Those that remained in Vichy France's control saw action in Syria against encroaching RAF forces, and on Madagascar against the Fleet Air Arm of the Royal Navy, suffering heavy losses against the service's Fairey Fulmar fighters.

Germany took possession of a large number of M.S.406s and the later M.S.410s. The Luftwaffe operated a number of the type for training purposes, while others were sold off to third parties. Finland purchased additional M.S.406s (as well as a few 406/410 hybrids) from the Germans, while others were passed off to Italy and some 48 aircraft were delivered to the Air Force of the Independent State of Croatia during 1943. Both Switzerland and Turkey also operated the type; the Swiss actually downed a number of both German and Allied aircraft during the 1944–45 period.

Before the Pacific campaign proper, Vichy authorities in French Indochina were engaged in a frontier war against Thailand, during 1940–41. A number of M.S.406s stationed in Indochina downed several Thai fighters before all French Air Force units were withdrawn from the theatre.

=== In Finnish service ===
The M.S.406 had a parallel career in Finland. In February 1940, the first 30 French fighters were allocated to LeLv 28, commanded by Major Jusu. These aircraft received the Finnish designations MS-301 to MS-330. They were used in combat against the USSR during the Winter War, and carried out 259 operational sorties and shot down 16 Soviet aircraft. In modified form, the M.S.406 were later involved in the Continuation War. Between November 1939 and 4 September 1944, Lv28 scored 118 aerial victories flying the Morane M.S.406 (the unit flew Bf 109Gs for a time, as well). The unit lost 15 aircraft. Total Finnish kills in Moranes were 121. The top Morane ace in all theatres was W/O Urho Lehtovaara, with 15 of his 44.5 total kills achieved in Moranes. The Finnish nicknames were Murjaani ("moor" or "Negro"), a twist on its name, and Mätimaha (roe-belly) and Riippuvatsa (hanging belly) because of its bulged ventral fuselage.

== Variants ==
=== M.S.405 ===
The M.S.405 was a low-wing monoplane of mixed construction, being furnished with a fabric-covered wooden tail and a bonded metal/wood material (Plymax) skin fixed to duralumin tubing. Plymax consisted of a thin sheet of duralumin bonded to a thicker sheet of plywood. It was the company's first low-wing monoplane design, as well as the first with an enclosed cockpit, and the first to feature retractable landing gear. The new 640 kW (860 hp) Hispano-Suiza 12Ygrs engine driving a two-pitch Chauvière propeller powered the first prototype, M.S.405-01, which flew on 8 August 1935. The second prototype, M.S.405-02, powered by a 670 kW (900 hp) Hispano-Suiza 12Ycrs engine, performed its first flight on 20 January 1937. Outfitted with the new engine, the fighter was able to attain a speed of 443 km/h (275 mph; 239 kn).

=== M.S.406 ===
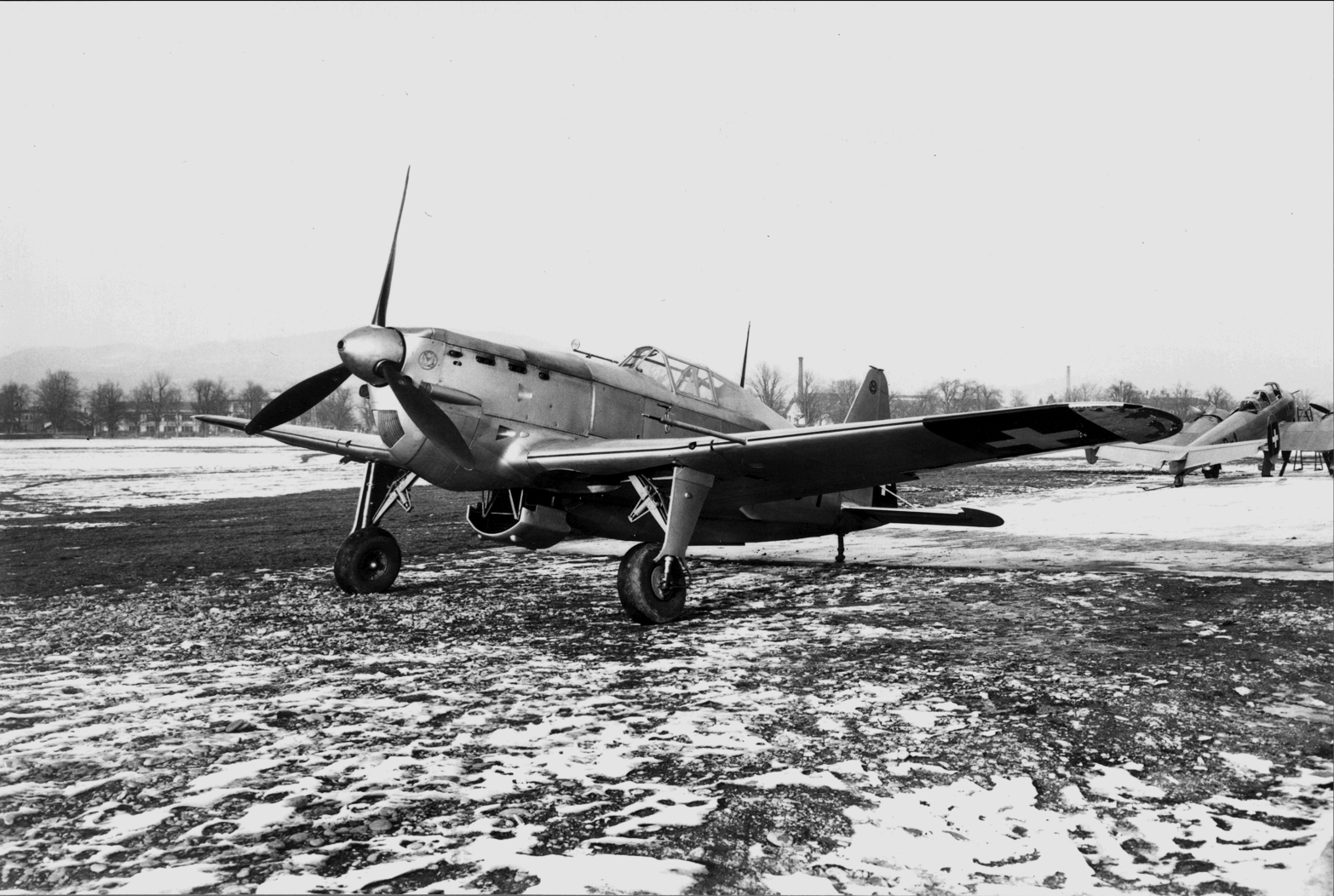
Morane-Saulnier MS.406 C-1 in Swiss markings, approx. 1939

The M.S.406 designation was adopted following various design changes from the earlier M.S.405 prototypes; two of the principal design changes were the inclusion of a new weight-saving wing structure and the new retractable radiator. Powered by the production 641.3 kW (860 hp) HS 12Y-31 engine, the new M.S.406 was over 8 km/h (5 mph; 4 kn) faster than the M.S. 405, at 489 km/h (304 mph; 264 kn), tested with no problem to reach up to 730 km/h (454 mph; 394 kn) in a dive. Armament consisted of a 20 mm (0.787 in) Hispano-Suiza HS.9 or Hispano-Suiza HS.404 cannon with 60 rounds in the V of the engine and fired through the propeller hub, and two 7.5 mm (0.295 in) MAC 1934 machine guns (one in each wing, each with 300 rounds).

=== M.S.410 ===
While the M.S.406 was entering squadron service in 1939, an upgrade series was initiated with the aim of improving the design. The result was the M.S.410, which included the adoption of a stronger wing, simpler fixed radiator in place of the earlier retractable design, an arrangement of four belt-fed MAC guns (which were heated by hot air to prevent the frequent jamming of the wing guns at low temperatures suffered by the M.S.406) in place of the earlier pair of drum-fed weapons, and the fitting of exhaust ejectors for additional thrust. The added thrust boosted the top speed to 509 km/h (316 mph; 275 kn) at 4,000 m (13,000 ft), resulting in an improvement of about 40 km/h (25 mph; 22 kn) over the M.S.406 at the same height. Production of the M.S.410 had only just started in May 1940, when the German attack resulted in the conversion programme being stopped, by which point only five examples of the type had been completed. Production was allowed to continue under German supervision, converting earlier 406s to the 410 standard, but many of these aircraft received only the new wings. Altogether, a total of 74 planes were modified.

=== M.S.411, M.S.412 ===
A single example of the M.S.411 was constructed by converting the 12th aircraft of the pre-production line with the 406 wing and the 750 kW (1,000 hp) Hispano-Suiza 12Y-45 engine. A later modification was started as the M.S.412 with the 780 kW (1,050 hp) Hispano-Suiza 12Y-51 engine, but this was not completed by the time the war ended.

=== M.S.450 ===
In 1939, Hispano started prototype deliveries of the new Hispano-Suiza 12Z engine of 970 kW (1,300 hp). One was fitted to a modified M.S.410 to create the M.S.450, giving dramatic improvements in performance, especially at altitude. However the engine did not enter production before France fell, and the similarly modified Dewoitine D.520 (the D.523) was considered a better design for the engine anyway.

=== Other variants ===
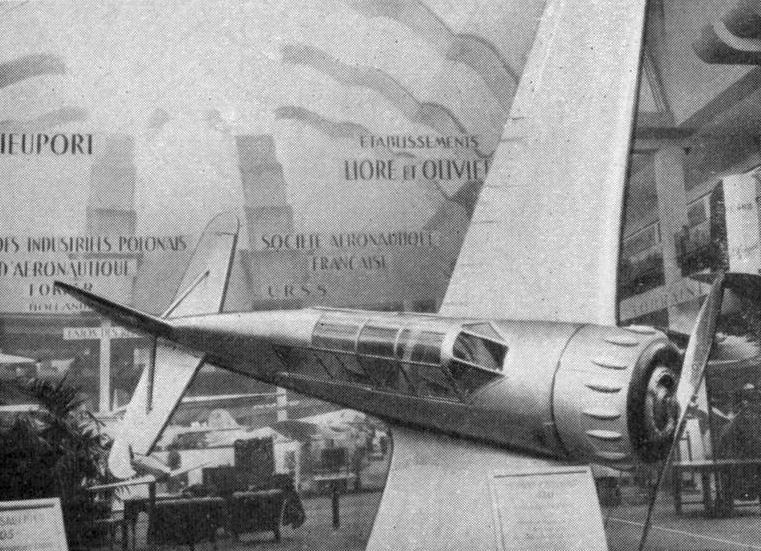
Morane Saulnier MS.430 photo from L'Aerophile December 1936

The M.S.406 airframe was also used in a number of other projects.

M.S.430
a two-seat trainer built by inserting a "plug" in the central fuselage with an extra cockpit for the trainee pilot, and using the much less powerful 390 hp (291 kW) Salmson 9AG radial engine.
M.S.435
a more powerful two-seat trainer version with the 550 hp (410 kW) Gnome-Rhône 9K engine.

=== Swiss variants ===
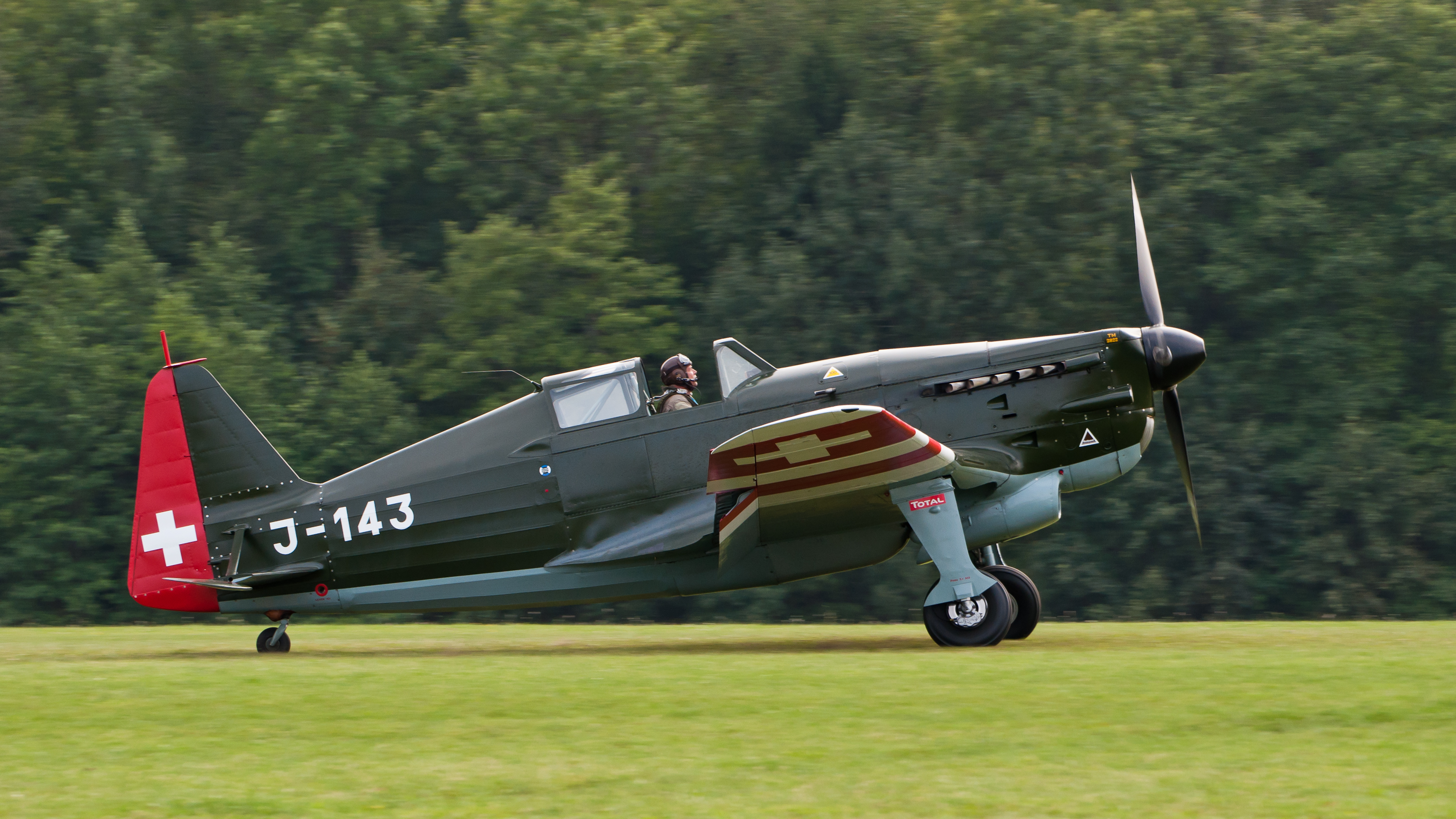
D-3801, a Swiss development of MS-406

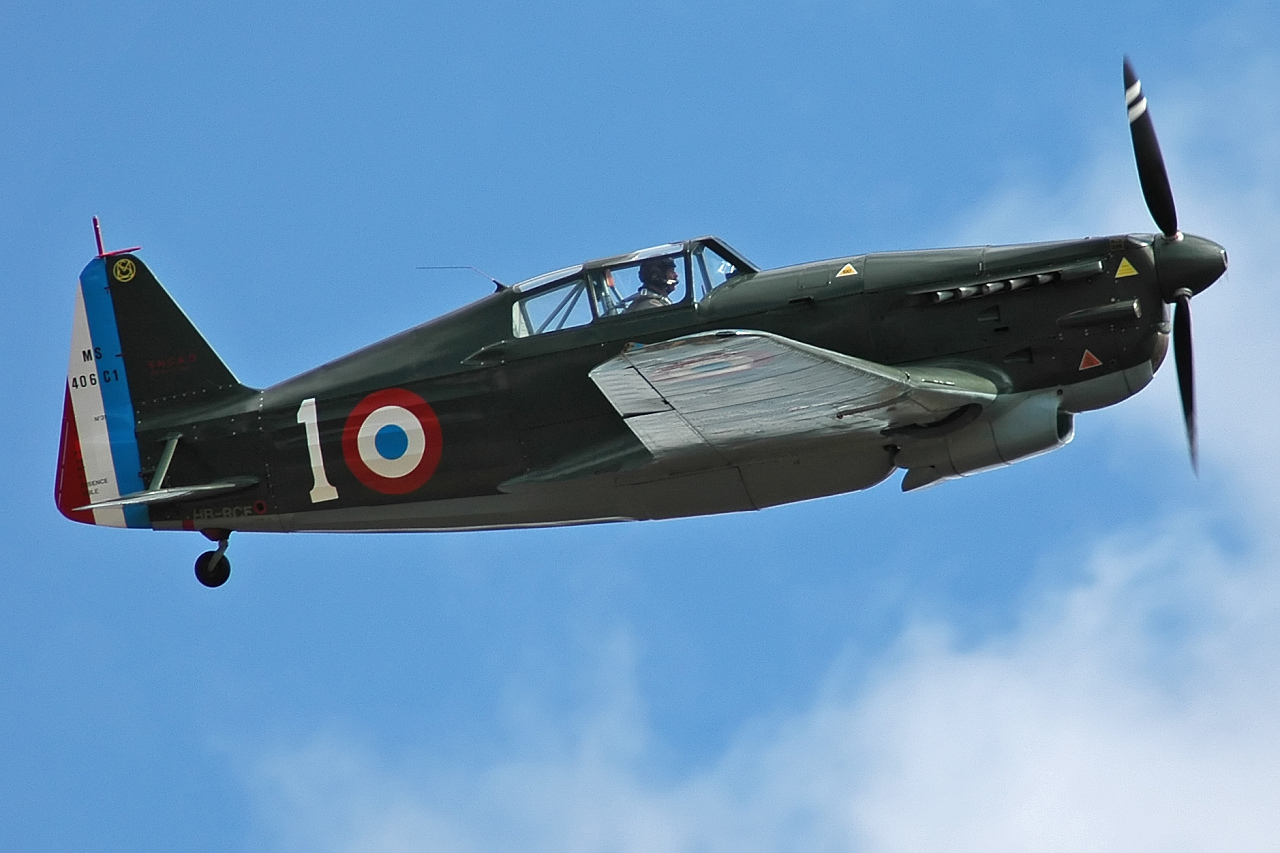
Morane D-3801 J-143 (Association Morane Charlie-Fox)

==== D-3800 ====
In 1938, Switzerland obtained a license for local production of the MS.406. Two MS.406H fighters were supplied to Switzerland in September 1938 and April 1939 to serve as pattern aircraft as the D-3800, retaining the earlier wing design of the 405, but powered by the newer Hispano-Suiza 12Y-31 engines as used by the MS.406.

Pre-production started with a run of eight aircraft from EKW with engines built by Adolph Saurer AG driving a new Escher-Wyss EW-V3 fully adjustable propeller. Instruments were replaced with Swiss versions and the drum-fed MAC machine guns with locally designed and built belt-fed guns, eliminating the wing-bulges of the French version, and avoiding the freezing problems encountered by French guns. The first of these aircraft was completed in November 1939. The pre-production models were then followed with an order for a further 74 examples, which were all delivered by 29 August 1940. In 1942, a further two were assembled with spares originally set aside for the original production run.

During 1944, surviving aircraft were modified with new cooling and hydraulic installations, and were fitted with ejector exhausts. These modifications were the same standard as the D-3801 series, making them identical with the exception of the engine installation. At the end of the war the remaining aircraft were used as trainers, until the last one was scrapped in 1954.

==== D.3801/3803 ====
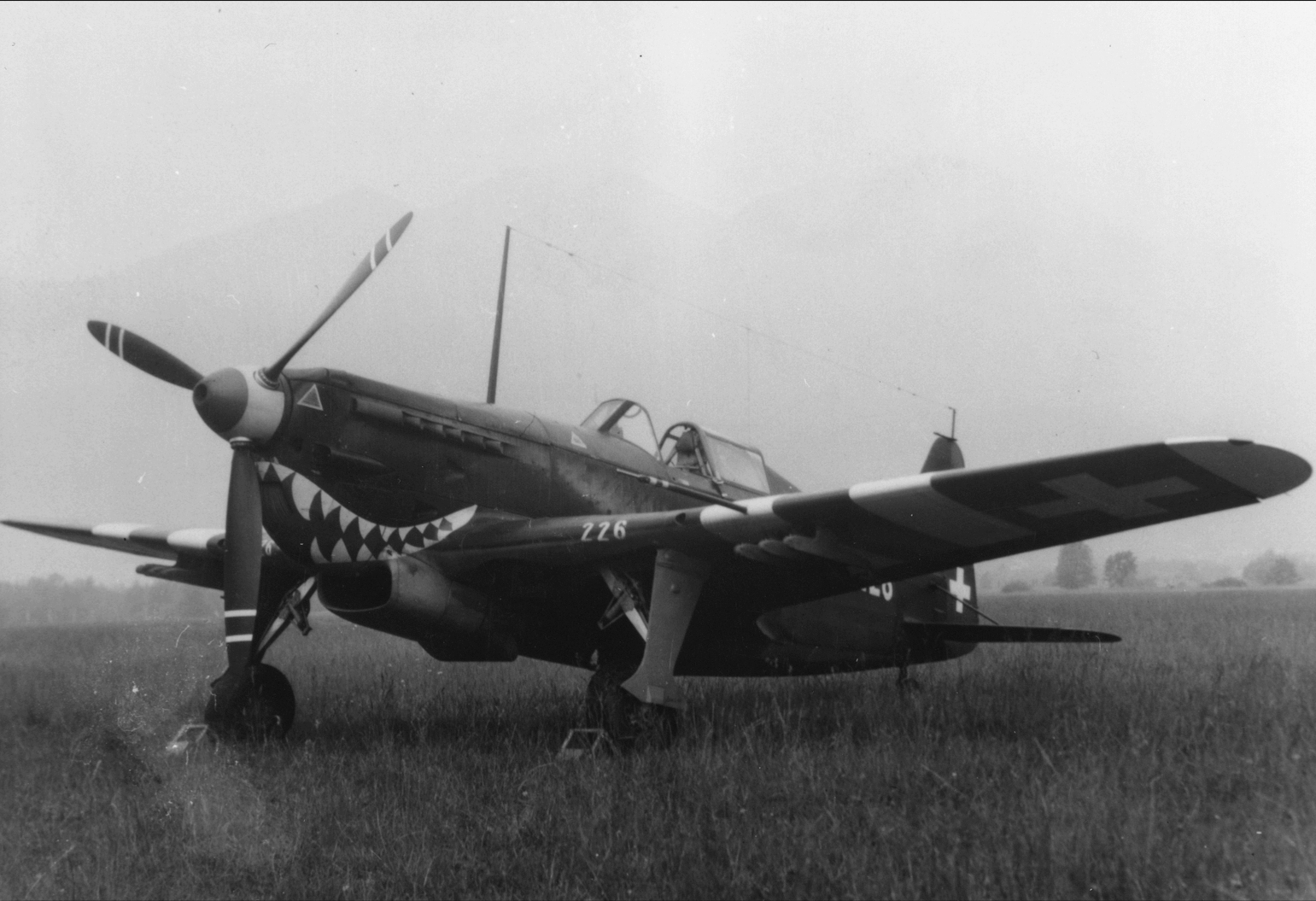
Swiss D.3801 circa 1941

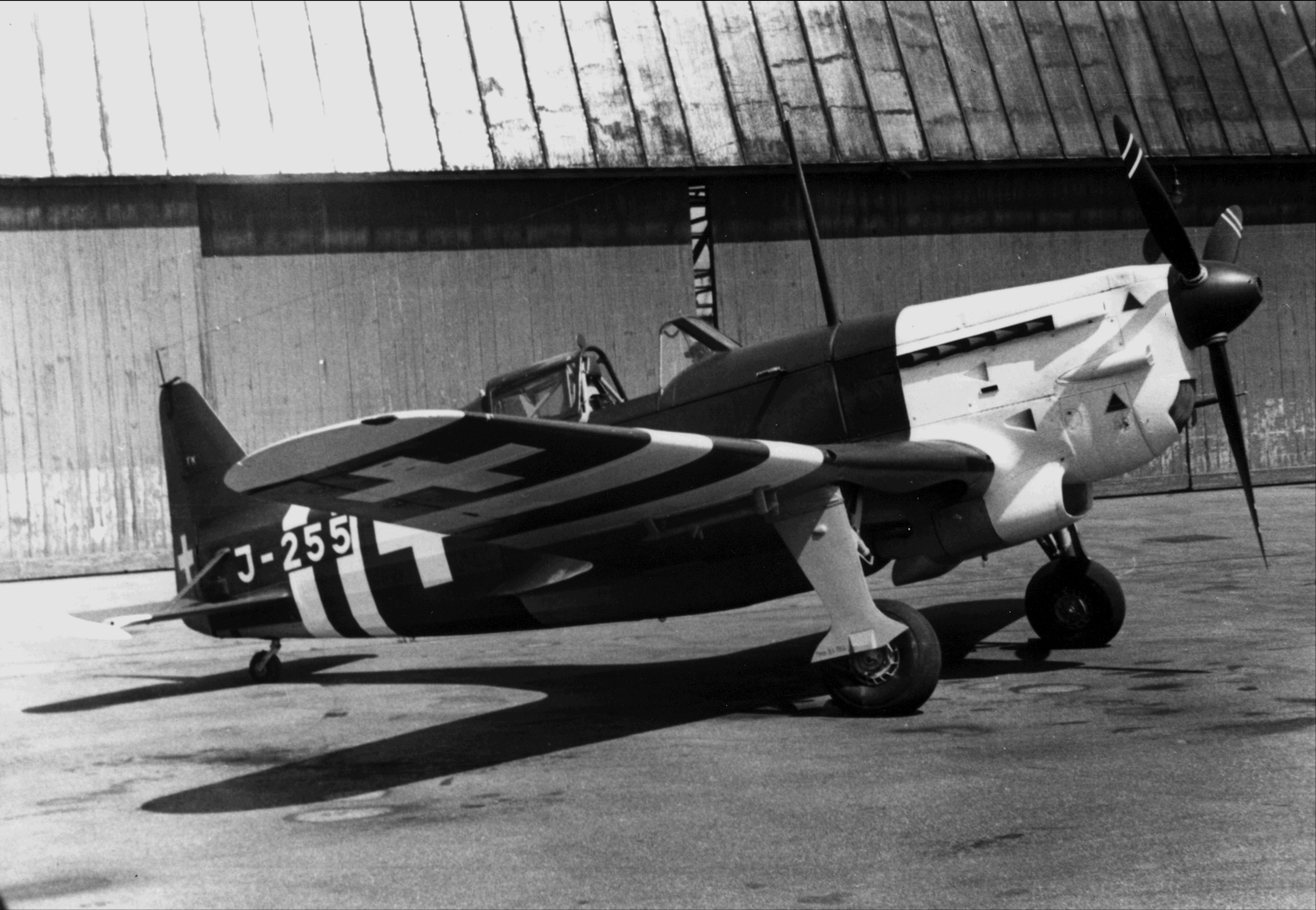
D.3801 in 1942

The Swiss continued development of the MS.412 when French involvement stopped following the June 1940 Armistice. The Dornier-Altenrhein factory completed a prototype powered with a licensed-produced HS-51 12Y engine, generating 790 kW (1,060 hp) together with the fixed radiator and revised exhausts as tested on the MS.411, in October 1940. The new type retained the armament changes and other improvements introduced on the D.3800. This series was put into production in 1941 as the D-3801 with continued deliveries until 1945 with 207 completed. Another 17 were built from spares between 1947 and 1948. Reliability of the new engine was at first extremely poor, with problems with crankshaft bearings causing several accidents. The engine problems slowed deliveries, with only 16 aircraft produced in 1942 and a single aircraft delivered in 1943. The engine problems were eventually resolved in 1944. With 790 kW (1,060 hp) from the Hispano-Suiza 12Y-51, the speed was boosted to 534 km/h (332 mph), roughly equivalent to the D.520 or the Hurricane. Weights were between 2,124–2,725 kg (4,683–6,008 lb). After being retired from operational use as a fighter when the North American P-51 Mustang was acquired in 1948, the type remained in service as a trainer and target tug until 1959.

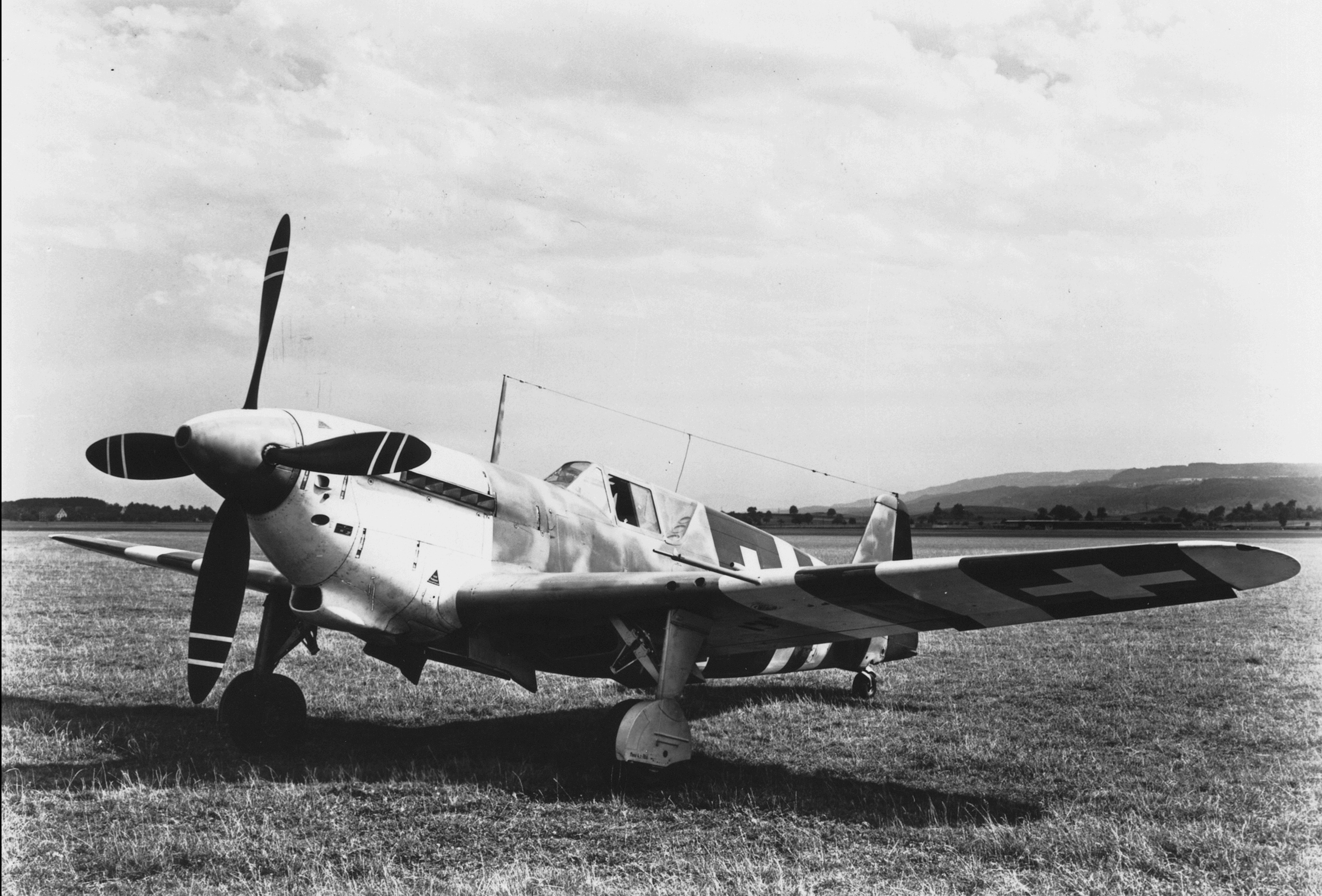
The re-engine D.3802 in 1946, 12 of which were produced.

The D.3802 was based on the MS.450, emerging as the MS.540, with a Saurer YS-2 932.1 kW (1,250 hp) engine. The prototype flew in the autumn of 1944, revealing several shortcomings, but it was capable of 630 km/h (391 mph; 340 kn). 12 were produced seeing limited use with Fliegerstaffel 17 and some other units.

The last development of this aircraft was the D.3803, with 1,100 kW (1,500 hp) Saurer YS-3 engine, and modified dorsal fuselage (with an all-round visibility canopy). The D.3803 was armed with three HS-404 20 mm (0.787 in) cannon (one in the nose, two in the wings), plus up to 200 kg (441 lb) bombs and rockets. Despite not having a powerful engine, the type reached 680 km/h (423 mph; 367 kn) at 7,000 m (22,966 ft). The performance was impressive, but the last development of this 1935 fighter design had several shortcomings and was not entirely successful. Its development was halted as P-51D Mustangs became available.

=== Finnish variants ===
==== Mörkö-Morane ====
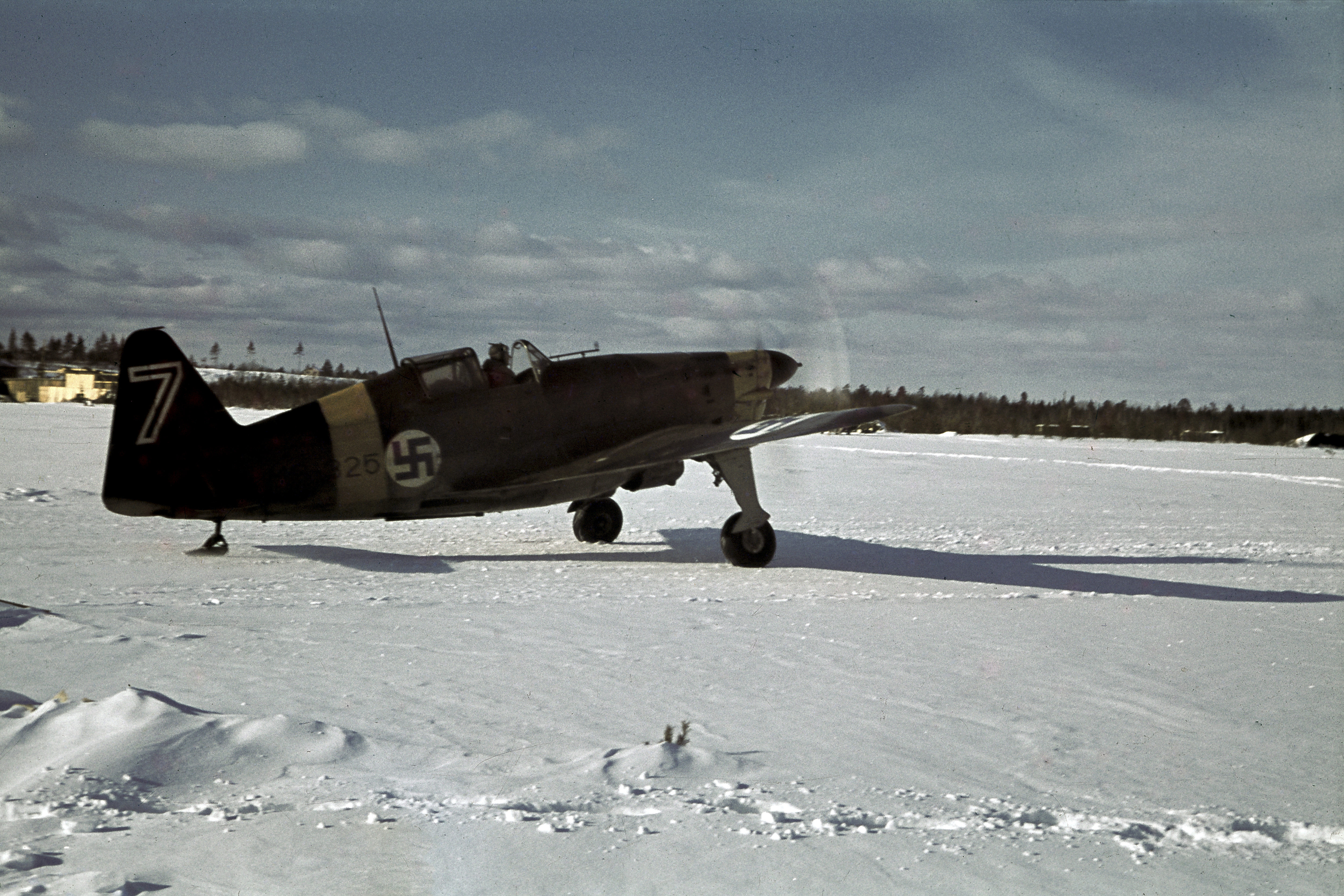
Finnish Morane-Saulnier M.S.406 departing for patrol during the Continuation War at Viitana, Karelia, 17 March 1942.

France sent 30 M.S.406s to Finland, between 4 and 29 February 1940. By 1943 the Finns had received an additional 46 M.S.406s and 11 M.S.410s purchased from the Germans. By this point, the fighters were hopelessly outdated, but the Finns were so desperate for serviceable aircraft that they decided to start a modification program to bring all of their examples to a new standard.

The aircraft designer Aarne Lakomaa turned the obsolete "M-S" into a first rate fighter, the Mörkö-Morane (Mörkö is the Finnish for "Bogeyman" or "Bugbear"). It is sometimes referred to as the "LaGG-Morane". The Germans also supplied captured Klimov M-105P engines (a licensed version of the HS 12Y) of 820 kW (1,100 hp) with a fully adjustable VISh-61P propeller to power the Moranes. The airframe required some local strengthening and also gained a new and more aerodynamic engine cowling. These changes boosted the speed to 525 km/h (326 mph; 283 kn). Other changes included a new oil cooler taken from the Bf 109, the use of four belt-fed guns like the M.S.410, and the excellent 20 mm (0.787 in) MG 151/20 cannon in the engine mounting. However, supplies of the MG 151 were limited, and several received captured 12.7 mm (0.500 in) Berezin UBS guns instead.

The first example of the modified fighter, MS-631, made its first flight on 25 January 1943, and the results were startling: the aircraft was 64 km/h (40 mph; 35 kn) faster than the original French version, and the service ceiling was increased from 10,000 m (33,000 ft) to 12,000 m (39,000 ft).

Originally, it was planned to convert all the 41 remaining M.S.406s and M.S.410s with the Soviet engine, but it took time, and the first front-line aircraft of this type did not reach LeLv 28 until July/August 1944. By the end of the Continuation War in September 1944, only three examples had been converted (including the original prototype). Lieutenant Lars Hattinen (an ace with six victories) scored three kills with the Mörkö-Morane, one with each Mörkö-Morane in the squadron. More fighters arrived from the factory, though, and the Mörkö-Moranes took part in the Lapland War as reconnaissance and ground attack aircraft. Not all the Mörkö-Morane conversions were completed before March 1945, when the entire re-engining programme was halted. After the end of the war, the total was brought to 41, which served as advanced trainers with TLeLv 14 until September 1948. In 1952 all remaining Finnish Moranes were scrapped.

== Operators ==
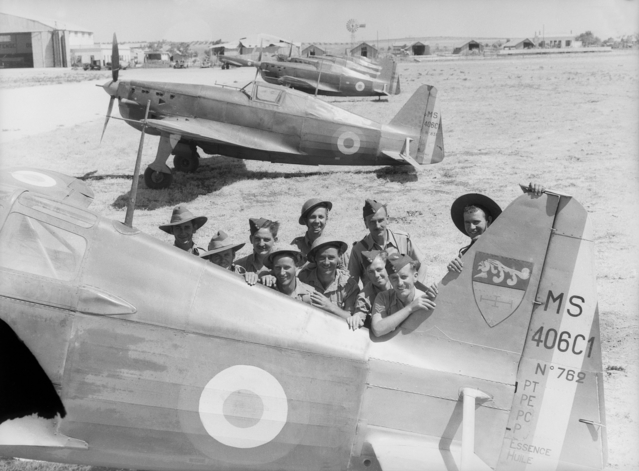
Australian troops with Morane-Saulnier MS.406C1 fighters of Groupe de Chasse I/7, Syria, in July 1941.

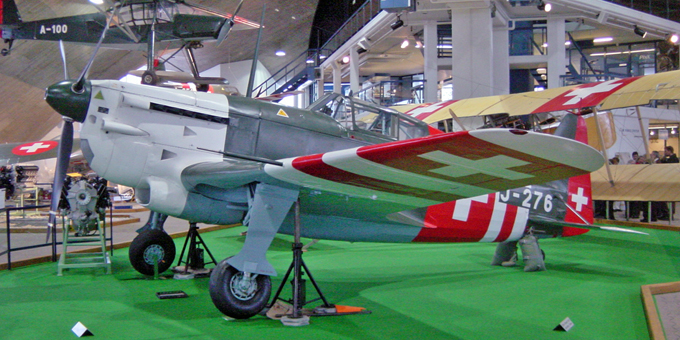
Morane-Saulnier D-3801 J-276 at the Flieger-Flab-Museum

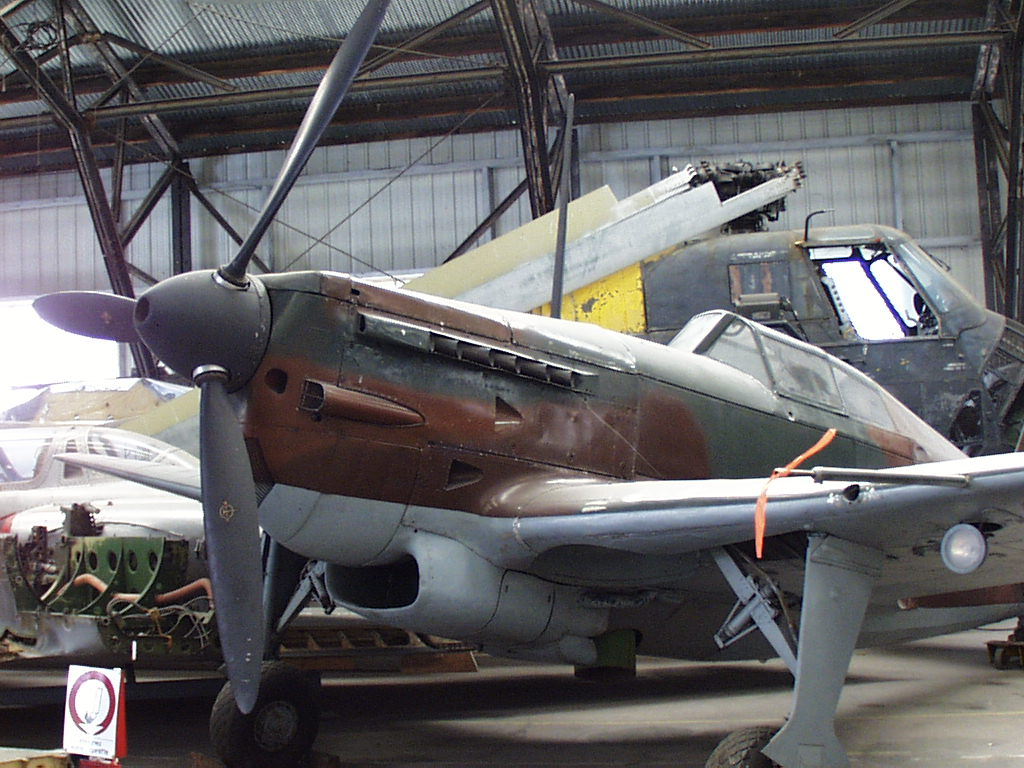
The D-3801 preserved at the Musée de l'Air et de l'Espace

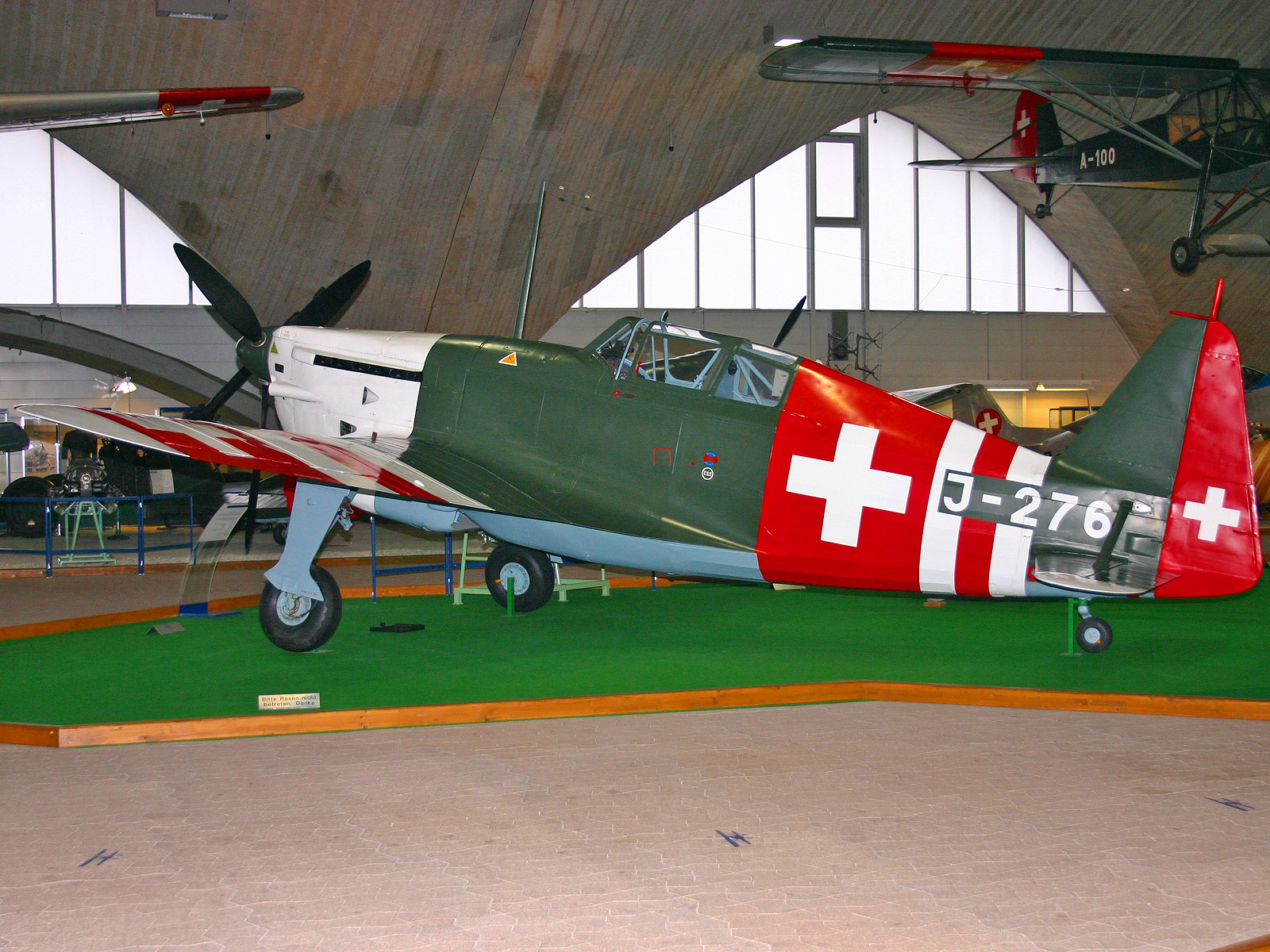
D-3801 J-276 at Fliegermuseum Dübendorf

China

- Nationalist Chinese Air Force ordered 12 aircraft in 1938 and they were shipped to Haiphong, but diverted to Escadrille EC 2, which fought against the Japanese and Thai in December 1940. One or two aircraft may have reached the Chinese Air Force.

Independent State of Croatia

- Zrakoplovstvo Nezavisne Države Hrvatske received 48 aircraft.

Finland

- Ilmavoimat received 76 M.S.406 and 11 M.S.410

France

- French Air Force
- French Navy

Vichy France

- Vichy French Air Force

Nazi Germany

- Luftwaffe operated captured aircraft.

Kingdom of Italy

- Regia Aeronautica

Lithuania

- Lithuanian Air Force ordered 13 to 20 Moranes, but none were delivered.

Poland

- Polish Air Force ordered 160 aircraft, but none were delivered, due to the fall of Poland.
- Polish Air Force in exile in France operated at least 91 aircraft in several training and combat units:
  - Groupe de Chasse de Varsovie
  - Section no.1 Łaszkiewicz GC III/2
  - Section no.2 Pentz GC II/6
  - Section no.3 Sulerzycki GC III/6
  - Section no.4 Bursztyn GC III/1
  - Section no.5 Brzeziński GC I/2
  - Section no.6 Goettel GC II/7
  - Jasionowski Koolhoven Flight
  - DAT section Krasnodębski GC I/55 based at Châteaudun and Étampes
  - DAT section Skiba GC I/55
  - DAT section Kuzian based at Nantes
  - DAT section Opulski based at Romorantin
  - DAT section Krasnodębski based at Toulouse-Francazal
  - Centre d'Instruction d'Aviation de Chasse at Montpellier
  - Ecole de Pilotage No 1 (Chasse) at Etampes
  - Ecole de Pilotage at Avord
  - Centre d'Instruction at Tours
  - Depot d'Instruction de l'Aviation Polonaise at Lyon-Bron
  - Montpellier Flight

Switzerland

- Swiss Air Force

Turkey

- Turkish Air Force received 45 Moranes. At least 30 of them were originally intended for shipment to Poland and had Polish stencilling.

Kingdom of Yugoslavia

- Royal Yugoslav Air Force ordered 25 aircraft, but the fall of France precluded their delivery

== Specifications (M.S.406 C1) ==
Morane-Saulnier MS 406 C1

Data from The Morane Saulnier 406

General characteristics

- Crew: 1
- Length: 8.17 m (26 ft 10 in)
- Wingspan: 10.61 m (34 ft 10 in)
- Height: 3.25 m (10 ft 8 in)
- Wing area: 16 m^{2} (170 sq ft)
- Empty weight: 1,895 kg (4,178 lb)
- Gross weight: 2,540 kg (5,600 lb)
- Powerplant: 1 × Hispano-Suiza 12Y-31 V-12 liquid-cooled piston engine

620 kW (830 hp) for take-off at 2,520 rpm at sea level
570 kW (760 hp) rated power at 2,400 rpm at sea level
640 kW (860 hp) rated power at 2,400 rpm at 3,150 m (10,330 ft)

- Specific fuel consumption: 0.265 kg/kWh (0.436 lb/(hp⋅h))
- Specific oil consumption: 0.008 kg/kWh (0.013 lb/(hp⋅h))

- Propellers: 3-bladed variable-pitch propeller, 3 m (9 ft 10 in) diameter

Chauvière 351M (MS 406 C1)
Ratier 1607 3.1 m (10 ft 2 in) diameter (MS 406 C1)
Hispano-Suiza 270 3.1 m (10 ft 2 in) diameter (D 3801)
Śmiglo WiSz 61P 3 m (9 ft 10 in) diameter (MSv Mörkö Morane)

Performance

- Maximum speed: 452 km/h (281 mph, 244 kn) at 2,000 m (6,600 ft)

483 km/h (300 mph; 261 kn) at 4,000 m (13,000 ft)
490 km/h (300 mph; 260 kn) at 4,500 m (14,800 ft)
476 km/h (296 mph; 257 kn) at 6,000 m (20,000 ft)
440 km/h (270 mph; 240 kn) at 8,000 m (26,000 ft)

- Stall speed: 160 km/h (99 mph, 86 kn) without flaps

135 km/h (84 mph; 73 kn) with flaps

- Range: 1,100 km (680 mi, 590 nmi) at 66% power
- Combat range: 720 km (450 mi, 390 nmi)
- Endurance: 2 hours 20 minutes 30 seconds (average combat mission)
- Service ceiling: 9,400 m (30,800 ft)
- Time to altitude:

2,000 m (6,600 ft) in 2 minutes 32 seconds
4,000 m (13,000 ft) in 5 minutes 16 seconds
4,500 m (14,800 ft) in 6 minutes 16 seconds
6,000 m (20,000 ft) in 9 minutes 3 seconds
8,000 m (26,000 ft) in 14 minutes 52 seconds
9,000 m (30,000 ft) in 21 minutes 37 seconds

- Wing loading: 154 kg/m^{2} (32 lb/sq ft)
- Power/mass: 2.95 kg/kW (4.85 lb/hp)
- Take-off run to 8 m (26 ft): 270 m (890 ft)
- Landing run from 8 m (26 ft): 340 m (1,120 ft)

Armament

- Guns:

- 1 × 20 mm (0.787 in) Hispano-Suiza HS.404 cannon
- 2 × 7.5 mm (0.295 in) MAC 1934 machine guns

== See also ==
Aircraft of comparable role, configuration, and era

- Dewoitine D.520
- Hawker Hurricane
- Heinkel He 112

Related lists

- List of interwar military aircraft
- List of aircraft of the French Air Force during World War II
- List of World War II military aircraft of Germany
- List of aircraft of World War II
