= Józef Kępiński (chemist) =

Polish engineer, chemist and university professor

Józef Kępiński ([juzɛf kɛ̃piɲski]; 19 June 1917 in Ruszkowo – 7 August 1981 in Szczecin) was a Polish engineer, chemist and university professor. A graduate of the Warsaw University of Technology, he specialised in chemical engineering and process engineering. Between 1965 and 1975 he was the rector of the Szczecin University of Technology. Kępiński was also a member of the Polish Chemical Society, the Polish Academy of Sciences and Polish Federation of Engineering Associations.
