= Teofil =

Teofil is a Polish and Romanian given name, a form of Theophilus. Notable people with the given name:

- Teofil Żebrawski (1800–1887), Polish mathematician, bibliographer, architect, biologist, archeologist, cartographer and geodesist
- Teofil Adamecki (1886–1969), Polish lawyer and activist
- Teofil Kwiatkowski (1809–1891), Polish painter
- Teofil Matecki (1810–1886), Polish physician, social activist, member of Poznań Society of Friends of Learning
- Teofil Oroian (born 1947), Romanian Army officer and military historian
- Teofil Pożyczka (1912–1974), Polish pilot during World War II
- Teofil Simchowicz (1879–1957), Polish neurologist who was born in Ciechanowiec, Poland
