= Szczepan Ścibior =

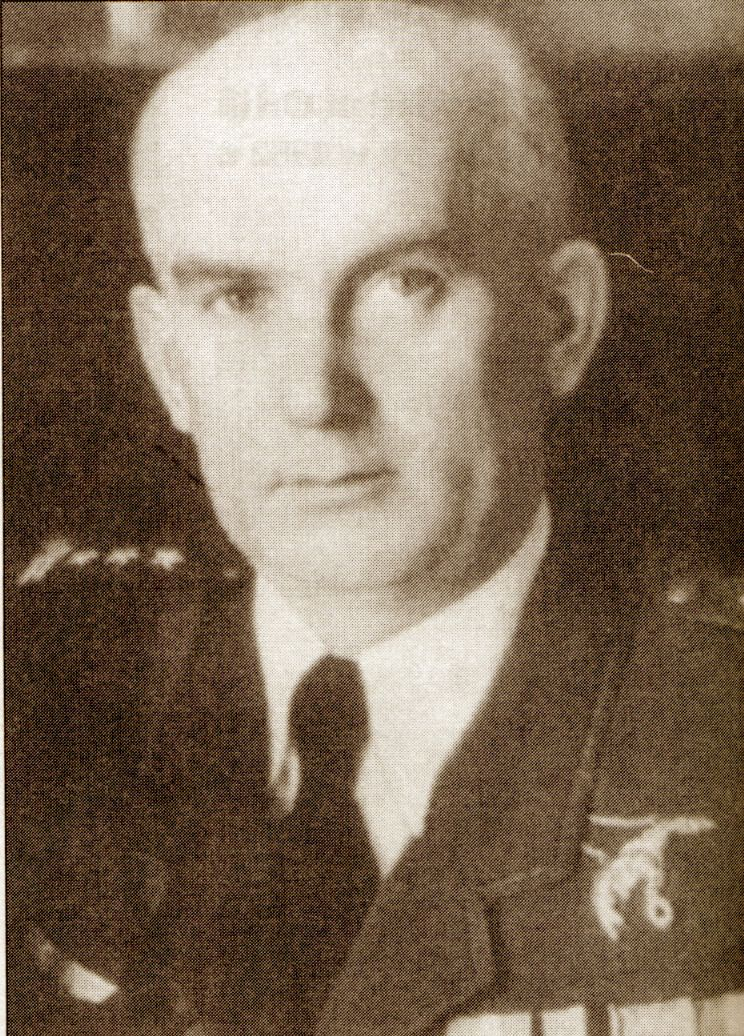
Szczepan Ścibior

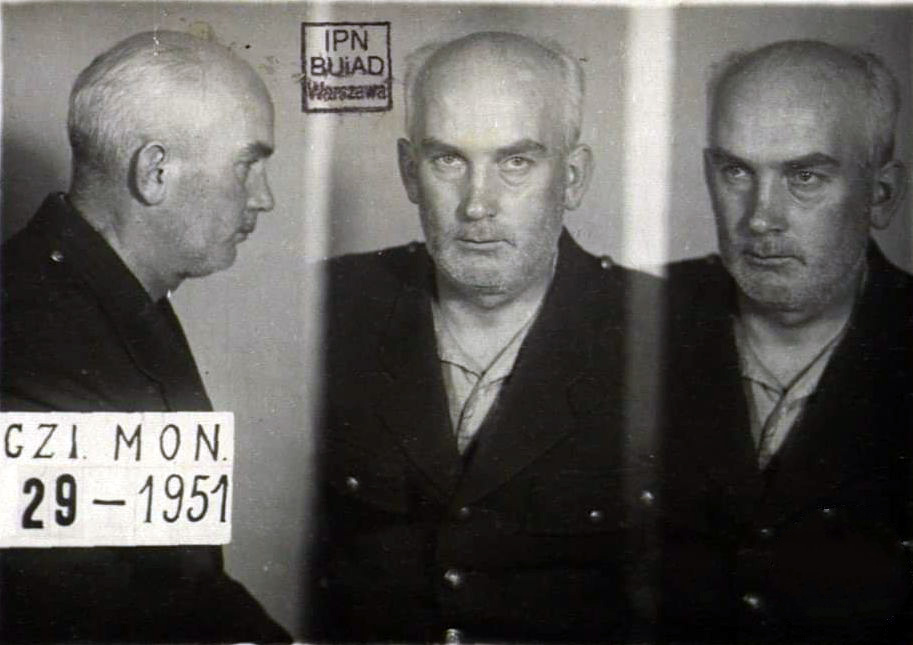
Szczepan Ścibior after arrest by Main Directorate of Information of the Polish Army 1951

Szczepan Ścibior (13 December 1903 in Uniejów, Poland – 7 August 1952 in Warsaw, Poland) was a Polish soldier, pilot, and patriot.

It has not been established what he was doing early years of his life. Most probably, he fought in the Polish September Campaign and later escaped to Great Britain.

In 1940, Ścibior became a member of the No. 305 Polish Bomber Squadron (Polish: 305 Dywizjon Bombowy "Ziemi Wielkopolskiej im. Marszałka Józefa Piłsudskiego") He was pilot of a Vickers Wellington. In 1941, his bomber crashed during a mission near Charleroi in Belgium. He managed to make his way to Brussels, where after hiding for nine days, he was caught by the Germans and sent to a POW camp.

Liberated by the British in 1945, Ścibior at first went to Great Britain, but in March 1946 decided to return to his native country. There, he took command of 7th Air Bomb Regiment in Łęczyca and in August 1947 he became commander of the famous Polish Air Force Academy in Dęblin.

He was arrested on 9 August 1951 and wrongly accused of being a British spy. Ścibior was tortured for many months, then sentenced to death. He was charged for his service in the Polish Air Forces (Polskie Siły Powietrzne) fighting alongside the Allies. His execution took place on 7 August 1952 in the infamous Communist Mokotów Prison in Warsaw.

In 1956 – following political changes in Poland – Ścibior was officially "rehabilitated" posthumously. His symbolic tomb is located at Warsaw's Powązki Cemetery.

== Sources ==
- A Postcard from Madrid
- "Informacje o nowościach na stronie z poprzednich lat" [Information about new products on the website from previous years] (in Polish).
- "Informacje - szczegóły" [Information - details] (in Polish).
- "Niektóre znane osoby, spoczywające na Cmentarzu Wojskowym" [Some famous people buried at the Military Cemetery] (in Polish). Archived from the original on 5 August 2009.
- "Inkwizytor Wolińska" [Inquisitor Wolinska] (in Polish). Archived from the original on 4 August 2008.
