= Magna Park (disambiguation) =

Magna Park can refer to:

- Magna Park, Lutterworth, a distribution centre in Leicester, UK, one of the largest in Europe
- Magna Park, Milton Keynes, road distribution centre
- Magna Park, Peterborough, rail road distribution centre (planned)
