= RAF Cammeringham =

Former RAF station in Lincolnshire, England

RAF Cammeringham (Formerly RAF Ingham)
- Ingham, Lincolnshire in England
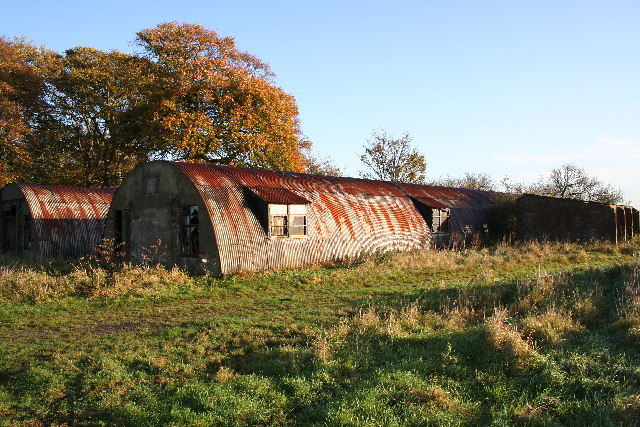
- Wartime Nissen accommodation huts still standing at RAF Cammeringham in 2005

Site information
- Type: Royal Air Force satellite station
- Owner: Air Ministry
- Operator: Royal Air Force; Polish Air Forces in France and Great Britain
- Controlled by: RAF Bomber Command * No. 1 Group RAF

Location
- Shown within Lincolnshire RAF Cammeringham (the United Kingdom)
- Coordinates: 53°20′28″N 00°33′18″W

Site history
- Built: 1940
- In use: May 1942 - 7 December 1946
- Battles/wars: European theatre of World War II

Airfield information
- Elevation: 61 metres (200 ft) AMSL
Runways
Direction	Length and surface
N/S	1,463 metres (4,800 ft) Grass
NE/SW	1,463 metres (4,800 ft) Grass
E/W	1,097 metres (3,599 ft) Grass
- Military Bomber airfield and later a training and aircrew holding station. Operated as a satellite unit of RAF Hemswell

Royal Air Force Cammeringham or more simply RAF Cammeringham (formerly RAF Ingham) is a former Royal Air Force satellite station used by RAF Bomber Command between 1940 and 1945 and the Polish Air Force until 1946. The airfield was located between the A15 (Ermine Street) and B1398 roads, 10.3 mi (16.6 km) north of the city Lincoln, Lincolnshire, England and due east of the village of Ingham.

Mainly used as an overflow airfield for nearby RAF Hemswell and later as a training establishment, its continued use was limited by damage to its grassed runways. The airfield closed in early December 1946.

== History ==
The site had been considered as a potential stand-alone airfield as early as 1936 but building did not commence until 1940 when RAF Hemswell needed additional capacity during the expanding the Second World War bomber offensive. Initially no squadrons were based at the station and it was used exclusively by Hemswell as an overflow site.

Detailed surveys were undertaken in preparation for the building of the concrete runways then needed for heavy bombers, but it was decided that the contour gradients were unsuitable and the runways remained grass only. However between 1940 and 1942 a concrete perimeter track was constructed, together with three hangars (1 x B1 and 2 x T2 types) and a technical site. A total of 36 pan-type aircraft standings were constructed in two phases.

The station's WAAF female personnel were billeted in a separate area within the station in Quonset huts that provided accommodation and messing facilities. The huts still stood as late as 2007.

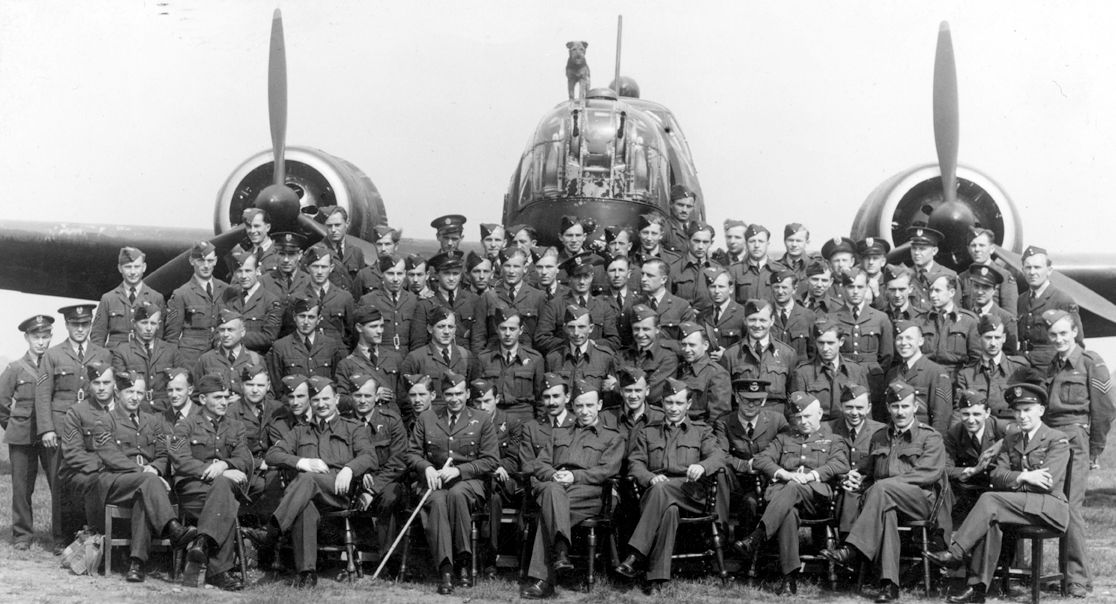
No. 305 Polish Bomber Squadron posed in front of a Vickers Wellington bomber aircraft in 1942

The first squadrons to be based at Ingham were No. 301 Polish Bomber Squadron and No. 305 Polish Bomber Squadron, both flying Vickers Wellingtons, that arrived on 20 June 1941 from Hemswell which could no longer accommodate them. They were joined by No. 300 Polish Bomber Squadron also operating Wellingtons on 28 May 1942. No. 300 Squadron left for several months during early 1943 while undertaking Lancaster conversion training but No. 305 Squadron remained at Ingham until August 1943.

Overnight on 31 May 1943 No. 301 squadron took part in a large bombing raid on Cologne losing two crews. Overnight on 6 June it visited Essen, where it lost another two crews. On 27 June the squadron bombed Bremen, losing even more air crew. On 3 July yet another crew was lost. Overnight on 22 July 1943 another three were lost to enemy anti-aircraft fire and fighter planes. The Polish HQ, lacking manpower and any more experienced crews, decided to disband the squadron.

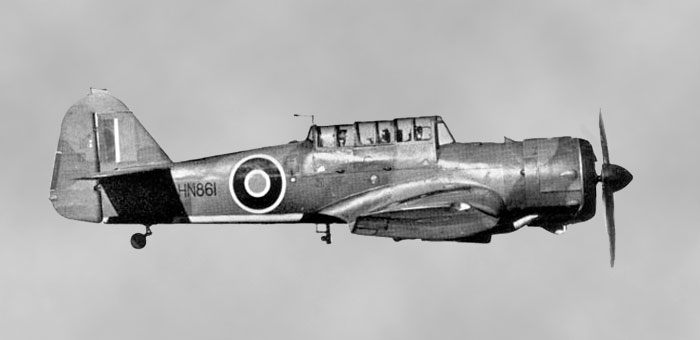
A Miles Martinet airborne target-towing tug aircraft

On 3 February 1943 No. 199 Squadron RAF arrived from RAF Blyton flying Short Stirlings while training over The Wash for maritime mine laying operations. Four months later they left for RAF Lakenheath to commence active operations off the east and south coasts. They were replaced at Ingham by two non-bomber training flights; 1687 Flight RAF flew Hurricanes while training personnel to defend bomber formations during operations; 1481 Flight RAF flew Martinets while towing airborne targets for the bomber gunners to practice their gunnery skills in defending their aircraft.

In November 1944, after several instances of urgent spares being delivered in error to units in Ingham, Norfolk and Ingham, Suffolk, the station was renamed RAF Cammeringham to prevent any further confusion. Flying effectively ceased from the airfield in early 1945 due to deterioration of the grassed runways and, from then until December 1946, RAF Cammeringham was used in a ground training school capacity and as a holding unit for demobilised Polish aircrew personnel awaiting repatriation or settlement. The station closed on 7 December 1946.

== Squadrons and units posted to RAF Cammeringham (Ingham) ==
Date of arrival	Unit	Notes
July 1940	No indigenous squadrons	Ingham used as an overflow ground for RAF Hemswell aircraft. - (Part of No. 5 Group RAF)
20 June 1941	No. 305 Polish Bomber Squadron	Flying Vickers Wellingtons. Posted to RAF Swanton Morley in August 1943 and became part of the RAF Second Tactical Air Force flying North American Mitchell bombers.
20 June 1941	No. 301 Polish Bomber Squadron	Flying Vickers Wellingtons. Squadron disbanded in July 1943 when crew losses during operations could not be restaffed.
28 May 1942	No. 300 Polish Bomber Squadron	Flying Vickers Wellingtons. Posted to RAF Hemswell for conversion to Avro Lancasters on 31 January 1943.
3 February 1943	No. 199 Squadron RAF	Flying Short Stirlings. Training over The Wash for marine mine-laying operations. Once trained the squadron departed for No. 3 Group RAF on 20 June 1943 where they operated from RAF Lakenheath.
5 June 1943	No. 1687 (Bomber) Defence Training Flight	Flying Hawker Hurricanes. Departed 4 December 1944
20 June 1943	No. 1481 (Bomber) Gunnery Flight	Flying Miles Martinets in a target towing role. Target tugs flown by Polish pilots of No. 148 Squadron RAF. 1481 Flight was posted on 4 December 1944 to RAF Marham
22 June 1943	No. 300 Polish Bomber Squadron	Returned from Lancaster training at Hemswell, but still flying Wellingtons. Departed for RAF Faldingworth on 1 March 1944 and were re-equipped with Avro Lancasters
10 March 1944	Night Bomber Tactical Training School	Relocated to RAF Finningley in May 1944
24 November 1944		Station is renamed RAF Cammeringham. - (Control transferred to No. 1 Group RAF)
9 July 1945	No. 16 Polish School of Technical Training	Closed 7 December 1946
14 November 1945	No. 4 (Polish) Aircrew Holding Unit	Closed 7 December 1946
7 December 1946		RAF Cammeringham disestablished and closed down

== The airfield site today ==
Cliffe House which had been commandeered by the Air Ministry for the duration of the war as the station's officers' mess still stands, back in private ownership. Also still standing is the brick built control tower and a number of pre-fabricated Quonset huts. Only the northern stretch of the concrete perimeter track remains and is in use for agricultural vehicles and as access to an industrial unit. The southernmost T2 Hangar stood as late as 2005 when it was demolished, only its footings are still visible from aerial photographs.

== Memorials ==
A heritage group has recently been formed and a memorial is now in place commemorating the four Polish Squadrons based at Ingham. The Windmill Pub located on the B1398 road displays a print of Wellington IV Z1407, BH-Z of No 300 Polish Bomber Squadron. The print shows battle damage to the aircraft following a raid mounted from RAF Ingham in September 1942. A total of 35 Wellingtons and crews were lost during operations from the airfield.

== See also ==
- List of former Royal Air Force stations
