= No. 308 Polish Fighter Squadron =

No. 308 "City of Kraków" Polish Fighter Squadron
- Active: 5 September 1940 – 18 December 1946
- Country: United Kingdom
- Allegiance: (Poland) Polish Government in exile
- Branch: Royal Air Force
- Role: Fighter and fighter bomber
- Part of: RAF Fighter Command
- Nickname(s): Krakow; Dywizjon Myśliwski "Krakowski"
- Aircraft: Hawker Hurricane; Supermarine Spitfire

Insignia
- Squadron Codes: ZF (September 1940 – December 1946)

No. 308 "City of Kraków" Polish Fighter Squadron RAF (Polish: 308 Dywizjon Myśliwski "Krakowski") was a Polish fighter squadron formed in Great Britain as part of an agreement between the Polish Government in Exile and the United Kingdom in 1940. It was one of 15 squadrons of the Polish Air Force in exile that served alongside the Royal Air Force in World War II.

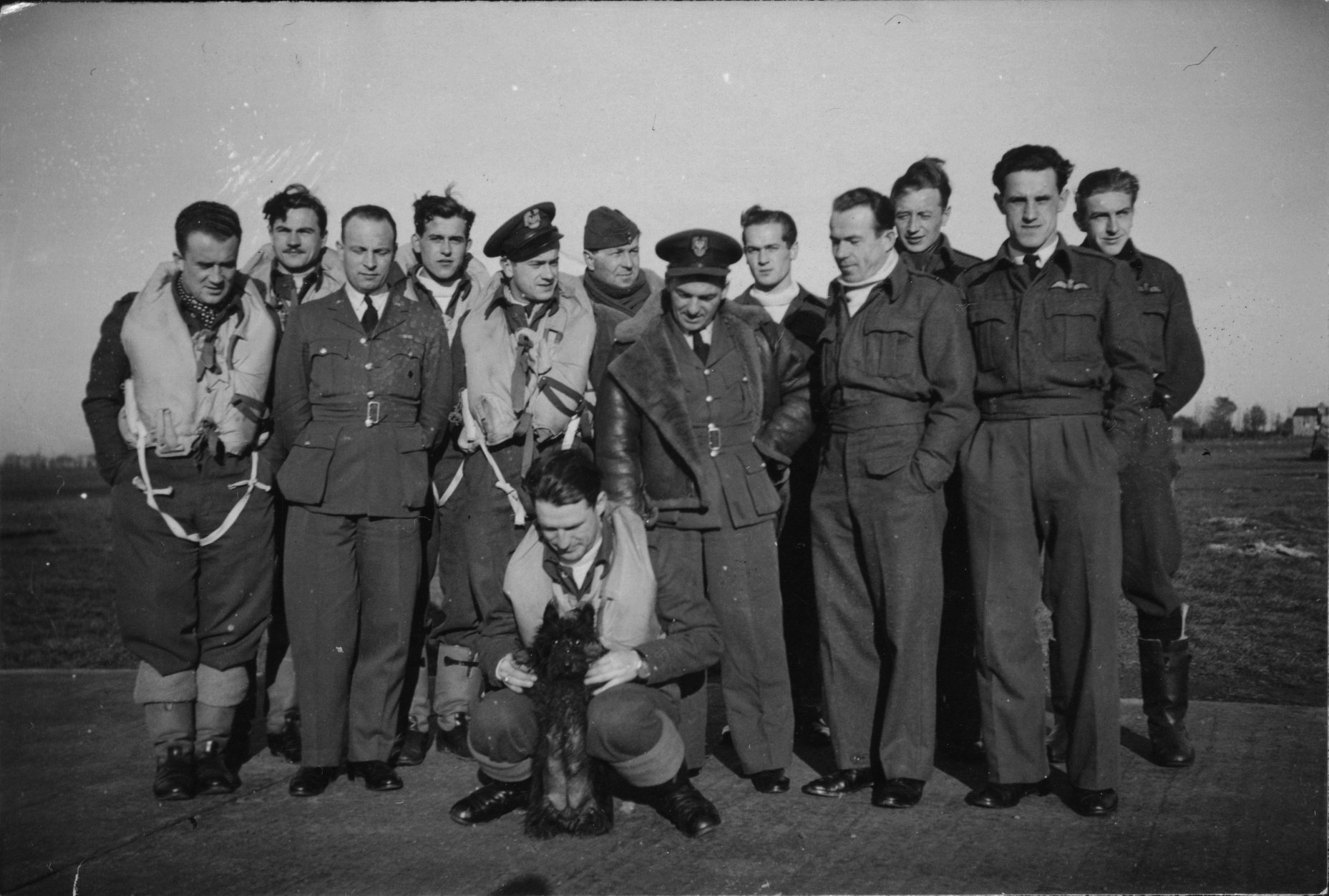
Pilots of 308 squadron (from left): Marian Wesołowski, Bolesław Palej, Forest Yeo-Thomas, Stefan Krzyżagórski, Stanisław Piątkowski, Stefan Janus, Tadeusz Rolski, Jerzy Popławski, Franciszek Skiba, Marian Pisarek, Jan Jakubowski, Tadeusz Schiele. Jerzy Zbierzchowski is kneeling, accompanied by the mascot of the 308 Squadron - female Jumbie

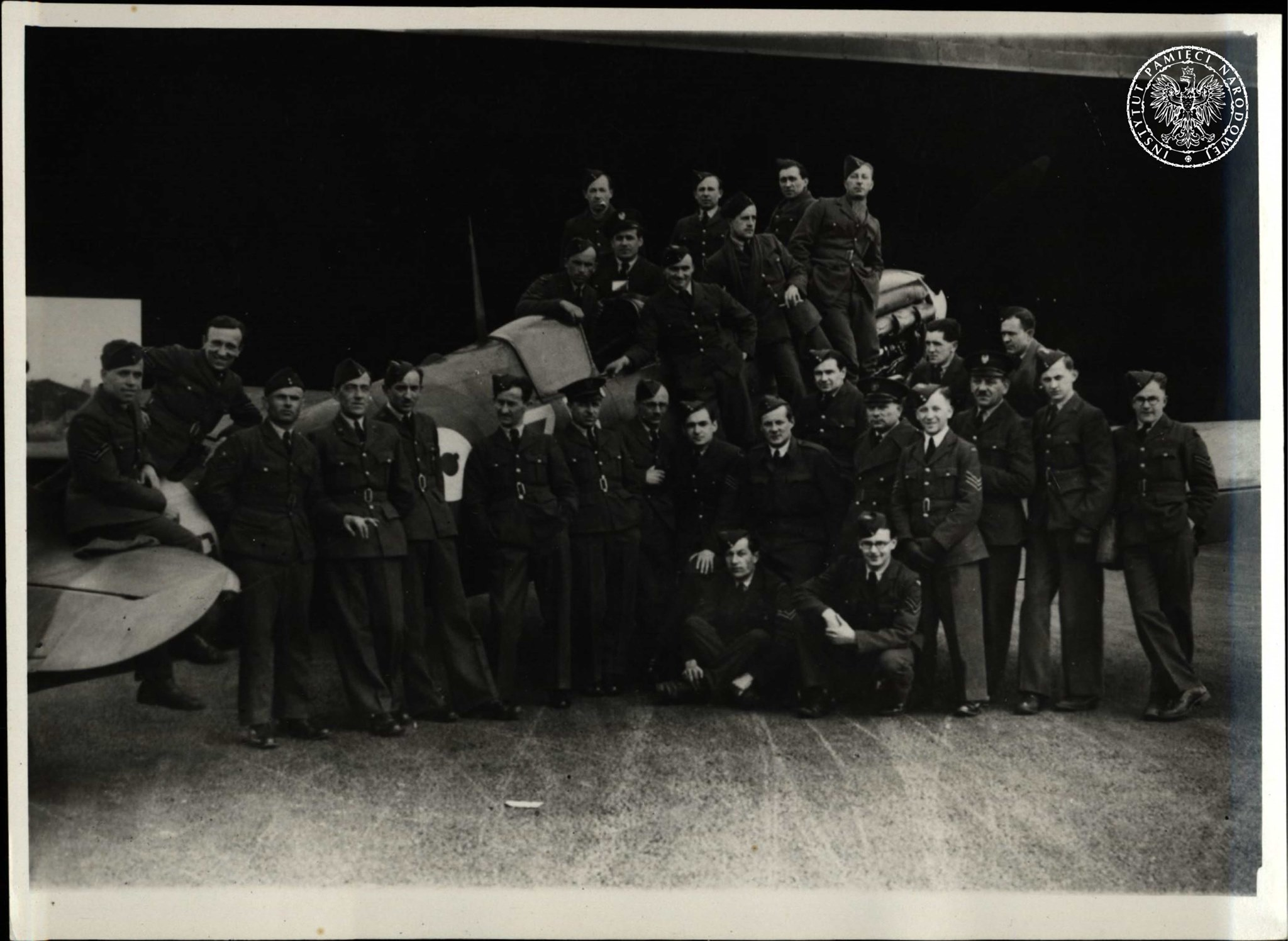
308 Squadron ground personnel posing with a Spitfire

== History ==
The squadron was formed on 5 September 1940 at the RAF Polish Depot in Squires Gate, Blackpool, from pilots of the Fighter Squadron of the 2nd Aviation Regiment in Krakow (in September 1939 the regiment was part of the Krakow Army). The personnel list was approved on 9 September 1940, and on 12 September the squadron of 170 personnel were transferred to Speke Airport near Liverpool for initial training. It was supplied with Miles Master (trainers) and Hawker Hurricane fighters. The first CO, Squadron Leader John Davies, was killed after striking a balloon cable just a few weeks after taking command.

On 24 November 1940, the squadron's first air victory was recorded when Pilot Mieczysław Parafiński shot down a Junkers Ju 88 bomber during a training flight.

The squadron began combat service on 1 December 1940, also preparing for night flights in order to repel Luftwaffe night raids.

By October 1941 the squadron was based at Baginton Aerodrome where "Tommy" Yeo-Thomas was intelligence officer. It then converted to Spitfires and operated from RAF Northolt. The new equipment was quickly mastered by the pilots, as evidenced by the success of 2nd Lt. pil. Wandzilak, who was the first of the PSP pilots to shoot down an Fw 190 on 21 September 1941.

The squadron was then operated over France before its transfer to the 2nd Tactical Air Force in 1943 as a fighter-bomber squadron. Its main task became the destruction of ground targets. Squadron pilots successfully destroyed a total of 536 land vehicles, 17 locomotives, 109 wagons, 45 ships and 28 buildings. The squadron then followed the allied advance across Europe after the Normandy Landings in 1944. It disbanded on 18 December 1946 at RAF Ahlhorn, Germany, after hostilities had ceased.

308 Squadron achieved 69 confirmed kills, 13 probable, and 21 damaged. This made it one of the most effective PSP fighter units.

== Aircraft operated ==
Aircraft operated by No. 308 Squadron RAF
Oct 1940	Apr 1941	Hawker Hurricane	I
Mar 1941	May 1941	Supermarine Spitfire	I
May 1941	Aug 1941	Supermarine Spitfire	IIA
Aug 1941	Nov 1943	Supermarine Spitfire	VB
Jan 1942	Feb 1942	Supermarine Spitfire	IIA
Nov 1943	Mar 1945	Supermarine Spitfire	IX
Mar 1945	Dec 1946	Supermarine Spitfire	XVI

== See also ==
- Polish Air Forces in France and Great Britain
- Military history of Poland during World War II

== Bibliography ==
- Jefford, CG (1988). RAF Squadrons. Shrewsbury: Airlife Publishing. ISBN 1-85310-053-6.
- Lewis, Peter (1968) [1959]. Squadron Histories, RFC, RNAS and RAF, Since 1912. London: Putnam. SBN 370-00022-6.
