= RAF Bramcote =

Former Royal Air Force station in Warwickshire, England

RAF Bramcote RNAS Bramcote HMS Gamecock
- Near Bramcote, Warwickshire in England

Site information
- Type: Royal Air Force station
- Code: RT
- Owner: Air Ministry; Admiralty
- Operator: Royal Air Force; Royal Navy
- Controlled by: RAF Bomber Command 1940-43 * No. 1 Group RAF * No. 6 Group RAF * No. 92 Group RAF; RAF Transport Command 1943-46; Fleet Air Arm 1946-58
- Condition: Disused

Location
- Shown within Warwickshire RAF Bramcote (the United Kingdom)
- Coordinates: 52°29′23″N 001°23′57″W

Site history
- Built: 1939/40
- Built by: John Laing & Son Ltd
- In use: 1940 - 1958
- Fate: Army barracks / Open land
- Battles/wars: European theatre of World War II; Cold War

Airfield information
- Elevation: 378 feet (115 m) AMSL
Runways
Direction	Length and surface
03/21	1,600 yards (1,463 m) Sommerfeld Tracking
08/26	1,400 yards (1,280 m) Sommerfeld Tracking
13/31	1,400 yards (1,280 m) Sommerfeld Tracking

Royal Air Force Bramcote, or more simply RAF Bramcote, is a former Royal Air Force station located 4 miles (6.4 km) south-east of Nuneaton, Warwickshire, England used during the Second World War. It was later transferred to the Admiralty and was known as Royal Naval Air Station Bramcote (RNAS Bramcote), and when commissioned became HMS Gamecock. When it subsequently transferred to the British Army from the Admiralty, it was called Gamecock Barracks.

== Royal Air Force operations ==
The airfield was built by John Laing & Son Ltd in the late 1930s. The first unit to use the airfield was No. 215 Squadron RAF which arrived on 10 September 1939 with the Vickers Wellington and the Avro Anson before leaving on 8 April 1940.

The next unit to use the station was No. 18 (Polish) Operational Training Unit (OTU) flying the Vickers Wellington which arrived from RAF Hucknall during June 1940. The unit used RAF Bitteswell and RAF Nuneaton as satellites between February 1942 and February 1943. However soon after this the OTU moved to RAF Finningley during March 1943.

During the Battle of Britain No. 300 Polish Bomber Squadron was formed at the airfield on 1 July 1940 with the Fairey Battle I before moving to RAF Swinderby on 22 August 1940 accompanied by No. 301 Polish Bomber Squadron which formed 21 days later and left for Swinderby 6 days later on 28 August.

These squadrons were replaced by No. 304 Polish Bomber Squadron and No. 305 Polish Bomber Squadron which formed at the airfield during August 1940 flying Battle I's and switched to Vickers Wellington IC's during November 1940 before moving to RAF Syerston on 2 December 1940.

No. 151 Squadron RAF moved in on 28 November 1940 with the Hawker Hurricane with a detachment going to RAF Wittering. On 22 December 1940 the unit moved to Wittering to equip with the Boulton Paul Defiant I.

Sometime in 1941 No. 1513 (Beam Approach Training) Flight RAF arrived using Airspeed Oxfords and after five years the unit moved out.

During April 1943 No. 105 (Transport) Operational Training Unit formed at the airfield flying Vickers Wellingtons, which were supplemented with Douglas Dakotas in March 1945. Between November 1944 and July 1945 Bitteswell was used as a satellite providing some relief for the busy station before the unit was renamed 1381 (T) Conversion Unit in August 1945 and moved out to RAF Desborough.

The gap was somewhat filled by 1510 BAT Flight using the Oxford who arrived during July 1946. However, after four months the flight moved out. With the airfield being transferred to the Royal Navy being renamed HMS Gamecock.

== Royal Navy operations ==
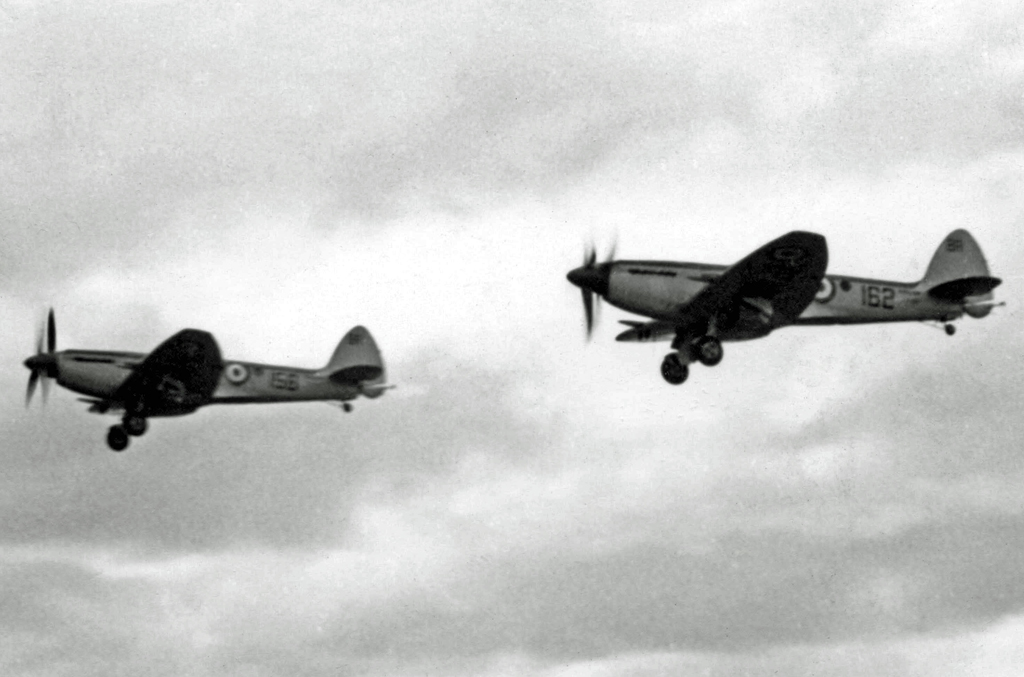
Supermarine Seafire F.47s of 1833 Squadron RNVR based at Bramcote in 1953.

On 1 December 1946 the airbase was transferred from No. 4 Group RAF to the Admiralty, and then known as Royal Naval Air Station Bramcote (RNAS Bramcote). A couple of days later, on 3 December, it was commissioned as HMS Gamecock.

RNAS Bramcote was given the ships name HMS Gamecock following normal Royal Navy practice and it was used by flying units of the Royal Naval Volunteer Reserve between August 1947 and October 1957. The first unit to be based was 1833 Naval Air Squadron which was equipped with Supermarine Seafire, a navalised version of the Supermarine Spitfire single engine fighter aircraft. Initially the F15 and F17 variants of Supermarine Seafire were used, but from June 1952, the unit became the only RNVR squadron to be equipped with the Supermarine Seafire FR47 version, which was fitted with contra-rotating propellers. These were replaced by Hawker Sea Fury FB.11, a single-seat fighter aircraft, in February 1954. The jet-powered Supermarine Attacker single-seat fighter aircraft was received in October 1955, and because these required better runway facilities, the squadron then moved to nearby RAF Honiley.

The Midland Air Division was formed on 1 July 1953 to control Bramcote-based squadrons. 1844 Naval Air Squadron formed at Bramcote on 15 February 1954, being equipped with Fairey Firefly AS.6 anti-submarine aircraft. Grumman Avenger AS.5 aircraft replaced the Fireflies in March 1956. Both squadrons ceased to exist on 10 March 1957 when all of the United Kingdom's reserve flying units were disbanded as an economy measure.

== British army ==
In 1959 the airfield was transferred to the British Army as Gamecock Barracks.

== Units and aircraft ==
- No. 151 Squadron RAF (1940) Hawker Hurricane I then Boulton Paul Defiant.
- No. 215 Squadron RAF (1939) Vickers Wellington I.
- No. 300 Polish Bomber Squadron (1940) Fairey Battle.
- No. 301 Polish Bomber Squadron (1940) Fairey Battle.
- No. 304 Polish Bomber Squadron (1940) Fairey Battle then Vickers Wellington IC.
- No. 305 Polish Bomber Squadron (1940) Fairey Battle then Vickers Wellington IC.
- No. 18 Operational Training Unit RAF (1940–1943) Vickers Wellington and Avro Anson
- No. 1 Air Traffic School (November 1945 - April 1946)
- No. 1 School of Air Movement
- Detachment from No. 6 Anti-Aircraft Co-operation Unit RAF (February 1941)
- No. 17 Air Crew Holding Unit
- No. 42 Gliding School RAF (January 1947 - November 1949)
- No. 1381 (Transport) Conversion Unit RAF (August - November 1945)
- No. 1510 (BABS) Flight RAF (July - November 1946)
- No. 1513 (Radio Aids Training) Flight RAF (September 1945 - May 1946 & October - December 1946)
- No. 2735 Squadron RAF Regiment
- Oxford Test Flight (December 1945 - July 1946)
- Squadron & Flight Commanders School (November 1945 - April 1946)
- Transport Command Air Crew Examining Unit
- Transport Command Examining Unit
- Transport Command Initial Conversion Unit (July - October 1946)

== See also ==
- List of former Royal Air Force stations
