= Ingham, Lincolnshire =

Village and civil parish in the West Lindsey district of Lincolnshire, England

Coordinates: 53.339°N 0.577°W

Ingham
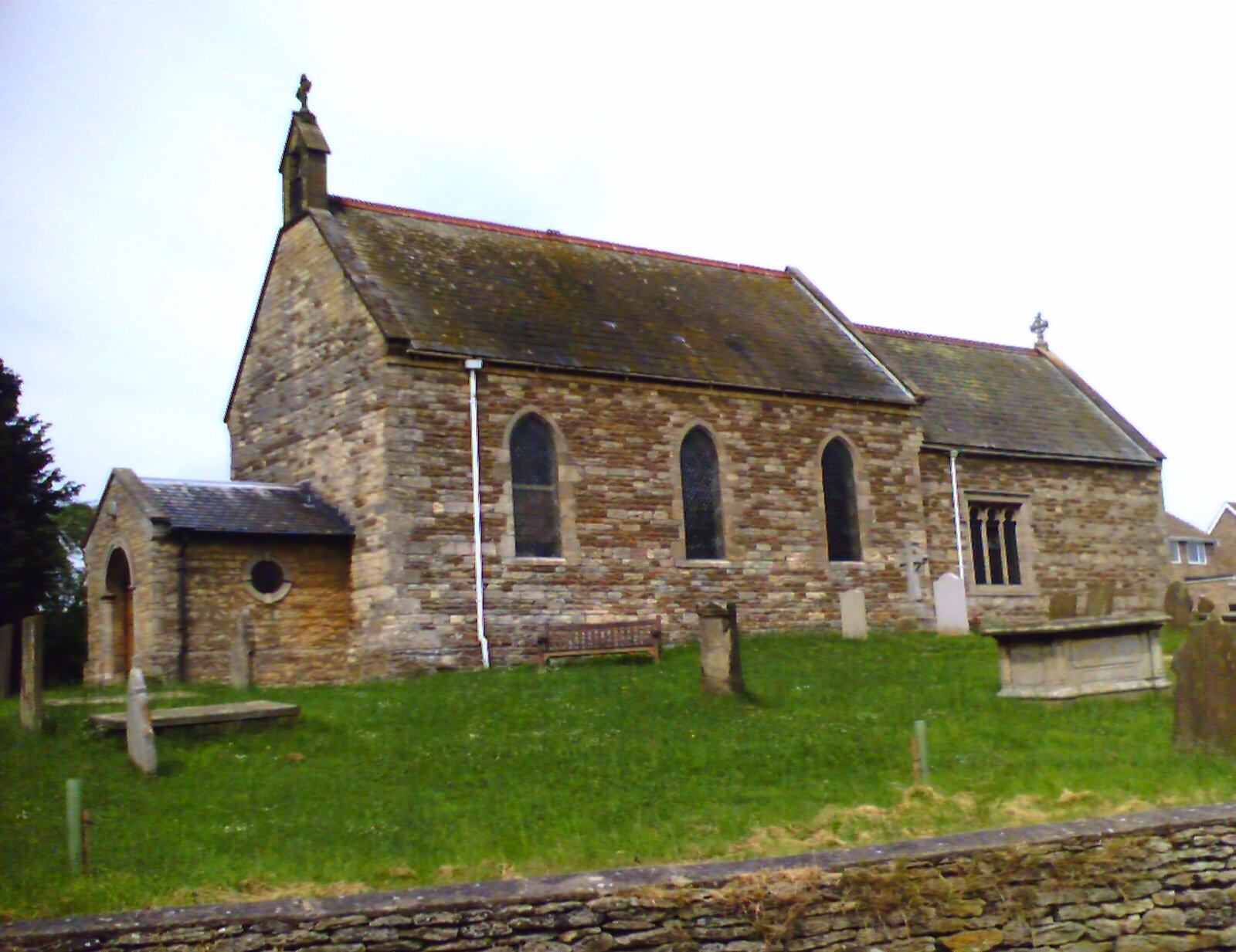
- All Saints' Church, Ingham

- Location within Lincolnshire
- Population: 857 (2001)
- OS grid reference: SK947834
  - London: 125 mi (201 km) S
- District: West Lindsey
- Shire county: Lincolnshire
- Region: East Midlands
- Country: England
- Sovereign state: United Kingdom
- Post town: LINCOLN
- Postcode district: LN1
- Dialling code: 01522
- Police: Lincolnshire
- Fire: Lincolnshire
- Ambulance: East Midlands
- UK Parliament: Gainsborough

Ingham is a civil parish in the West Lindsey district of Lincolnshire, England. It lies 7 miles (11 km) geographically north of the centre of Lincoln and it can be accessed by taking the B1398 road, which runs parallel to the main A15 (Ermine Street).

== History ==
Ingham is written in the Domesday Book of 1086 as "Ingeham". Possible etymologies are "homestead or village of a man called Inga" or "home of the Inguiones" (an ancient Germanic tribe).

In the Second World War, the village became home to RAF Ingham, a satellite airfield of RAF Hemswell consisting of three grass runways. Three Polish squadrons from 1st Polish Wing were based here, joined later by No. 199 Squadron RAF. In 1944, it was renamed RAF Cammeringham. The station effectively became unusable by 1945 as the short grass runways had deteriorated. After the war, it became home to demobilised Polish aircrew.

== Boundaries ==
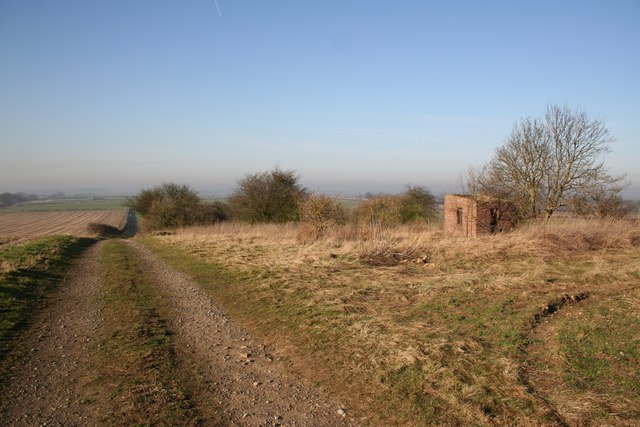
View towards the River Trent near the B1398

Ingham's parish boundary borders are located within Fillingham and two field widths to the north. It follows the hedge line and a small drain eastwards to Middle Street (B1398), which it follows to the south, followed by the southern edge of Hare's Wood eastwards. The boundary follows the southern edge of a small wood at Ancholme Head. The parish boundary meets with West Firsby at the A15 (Ermine Street) which it follows to the south until Spridlington.

North of the curve in the A15, the boundary follows Ingham Lane to the west. It crosses Middle Street at Ingham Cliff, near Ingham Cliff Farm. To the north along the B1398, the Windmill public house is situated, in the neighbouring parish of Spridlington. The boundary follows the B1398 down Lincoln Cliff, over the crossroads along the road.

== Surroundings ==
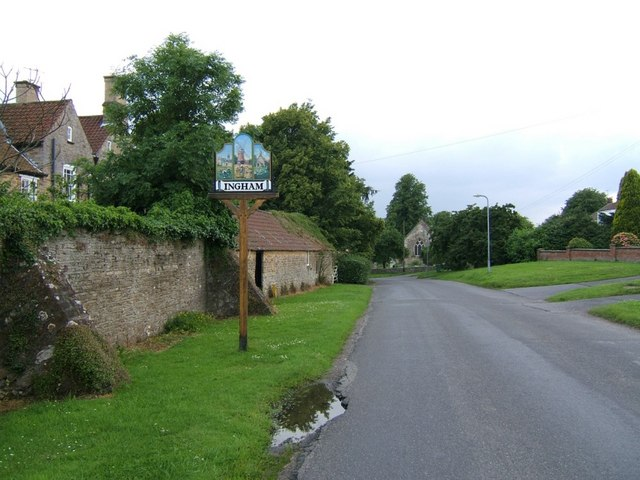
Entering Ingham from the east

The parish church, located on Church Hill at the east of the village, is dedicated to All Saints. Just to the west of All Saints is a Methodist church. Ingham Primary School is at the south of the village green next to the village hall, and on the opposite side of the green is a small village store. The two village public houses are the Black Horse and the Inn on the Green. A self-catering holiday establishment is located nearby to the Inn on the Green.

Within the parish at the north-east of the village, and on opposite sides of the B1398 road, is a distribution centre (on the former airfield) for an outdoor toy manufacturer and a rescue and boarding kennels. A centre dedicated to the retired RAF Station is open to the public on Sunday mornings; it has a small café and includes information on Ingham's history. A bed and breakfast establishment can be found in the south of the village.
