= RAF Lindley =

Former RAF base in Leicestershire, England

RAF Lindley
- Higham on the Hill, Leicestershire in England

Site information
- Type: Royal Air Force station
- Owner: Air Ministry
- Operator: Royal Air Force
- Controlled by: RAF Flying Training Command

Location
- Shown within Leicestershire RAF Lindley (the United Kingdom)
- Coordinates: 52°33′42″N 001°26′50″W

Site history
- Built: 1940
- In use: 1940 - 1946
- Battles/wars: European theatre of World War II

Airfield information
- Elevation: 100 metres (328 ft) AMSL
Runways
Direction	Length and surface
00/00	Concrete
00/00	Concrete
00/00	Concrete

Royal Air Force Lindley or more simply RAF Lindley is a former Royal Air Force station situated in Leicestershire 8.1 miles (13 km) south east of Polesworth, Warwickshire, England in close proximity to Watling Street.

The airfield opened in 1943 before closing in 1946.

== History ==
The first unit to use the airfield was No. 1513 (Beam Approach Training) Flight RAF (BAT Flt) flying the Airspeed Oxford based at RAF Bramcote, RAF Bitteswell and Lindley between 31 October 1942 and 13 May 1946. From 7 February 1943 until 27 March 1943 No. 18 (Polish) Operational Training Unit RAF used the airfield as a satellite from RAF Bramcote flying Avro Ansons, Fairey Battles and Vickers Wellingtons but the airfield was transferred to RAF Transport Command on 25 June 1943 and was home to No. 105 Operational Training Unit flying Vickers Wellingtons and Douglas Dakotas until 21 November 1945. However the unit was renamed No. 1381 (Transport) Conversion Unit RAF before moving to RAF Desborough on 10 August 1943.

=== United States Army use ===
The airfield was used by the Air Echelon of 250th Field Artillery, United States Army, with the Piper L-4 Cub, 'Grasshopper' between March and June 1944 before 30 November 1945 when the airfield was placed on care and maintenance.

== Current use ==
The Motor Industry Research Association (MIRA) started using the airfield from October 1948 two years after it was founded.
