= RAF Bitteswell =

Former Royal Air Force station in Leicestershire, England

RAF Bitteswell
- Near Bitteswell, Leicestershire in England

Site information
- Type: Royal Air Force satellite station
- Code: BT
- Owner: Air Ministry
- Operator: Royal Air Force
- Controlled by: RAF Bomber Command * No. 7 (T) Group RAF * No. 93 (OTU) Group RAF; RAF Transport Command

Location
- Shown within Leicestershire RAF Bitteswell (the United Kingdom)
- Coordinates: 52°27′34″N 001°14′46″W

Site history
- Built: 1940/41
- In use: July 1941 - 1987
- Battles/wars: European theatre of World War II; Cold War

Airfield information
- Elevation: 420 feet (128 m) AMSL
Runways
Direction	Length and surface
04/22	1,672 metres (5,486 ft) Concrete
10/28	1,170 metres (3,839 ft) Concrete
17/35	1,170 metres (3,839 ft) Concrete

Royal Air Force Bitteswell or more simply RAF Bitteswell is a former Royal Air Force satellite station located 2.0 miles (3.2 km) west of Lutterworth, Leicestershire and 6 miles (9.7 km) north of Rugby, Warwickshire, England.

Construction of the grass airfield at RAF Bitteswell was started in March 1940 and it opened in June 1941. The original grass runways were replaced between February and June 1943 with concrete and asphalt. During WW2 it was used by the RAF for bomber operations and training. During and after WW2 it was also used for aircraft assembly, maintenance, and jet engine development.

== History ==
=== Second World War ===
RAF Bitteswell was home to many different units and aircraft, such as No. 1513 (Beam Approach Training) Flight RAF (BAT Flt) flying Airspeed Oxfords from RAF Bramcote, RAF Lindley and Bitteswell between 23 October 1942 and 13 May 1946.

A large number of operational training units (OTU) were based at the airfield. OTU were units which taught flying, navigation and basic Morse code. The difference between OTUs and other training units were that the OTUs performed live missions such as bombing (like the 1,000 Bomber raids), air sea rescue and occasionally mine laying. No.18 Operational Training Unit (OTU) flying the Avro Anson, Fairey Battle and the Vickers Wellington again flying from the main base of RAF Bramcote with Nuneaton (Lindley) and Bitteswell as satellites. The unit was operational from 14 November 1940 and 25 January 1943 and was RAF Bomber Commands Polish training unit.

- No. 29 Operational Training Unit RAF (29 OTU), utilising the Vickers Wellington, used Bitteswell as a satellite from their main base at RAF Bruntingthorpe, from 1 June 1943 to 1 November 1944.
- No. 105 (Transport) Operational Training Unit RAF flying the Wellington and the Douglas Dakota from their main base at Bramcote and using Bitteswell as a satellite, between 5 April 1943 and 19 November 1945. The unit became No. 1381 (Transport) Conversion Unit RAF still its main base at Bramcote and using Bitteswell between August and November 1945.
- No. 2735 Squadron RAF Regiment

=== Post war units ===
A number of units used the airfield as a satellite to disperse aircraft and for maintenance such as Transport Command Air Crew Examining Unit RAF from RAF Bramcote from December 1945 until August 1946, No. 266 Maintenance Unit RAF between January 1946 and 1947 and No. 20 Service Flying Training School RAF from RAF Church Lawford used Bitteswell as a relief landing ground between July 1946 and May 1947.

== Aircraft manufacture ==
In 1943 a factory was built next to the airfield where Armstrong Whitworth Aircraft assembled aircraft manufactured at Baginton, Coventry. This continued to assemble, test, and maintain aircraft until 1983. In 1947 Armstrong Siddeley established an Experimental Flight Section at Bitteswell for the flight development of jet engines installed in flying test beds. In 1956 the airfield was purchased outright from the Air Ministry.

=== Aircraft operated ===
- Armstrong Whitworth AW.660 Argosy
- Avro Lancaster
- Avro Lincoln
- Avro Shackleton
- Avro Vulcan
- BAE Systems Hawk
- Blackburn Buccaneer
- Folland Gnat
- Gloster Javelin
- Gloster Meteor
- Handley Page Victor
- Hawker Hunter
- Hawker Sea Hawk
- Vickers VC10

== Accidents and incidents ==
Date	Incident	Reference
29 September 1941	Wellington R3216 of No.18 Operational Training Unit (OTU) stalled on landing. LAC S W J Green awarded George Medal for helping to save rear gunner, but rest of crew perished	
23 October 1941	Wellington R1138 of No.18 Operational Training Unit (OTU) hit a tree at Ullesthorpe. All 4 crew injured	
29 June 1943	Wellington Z1668 of No.29 Operational Training Unit (OTU) force landed at Bitteswell after engine failure. Crew were unhurt	
16 August 1943	Wellington BK550 of No.29 Operational Training Unit (OTU) overshot landing at Bitteswell. Crew were unhurt	
6 September 1943	Wellington BK442 of No.29 Operational Training Unit (OTU) belly landed following engine failure. Crew were unhurt	
11 April 1944	Miles Martinet JN427 of No.29 Operational Training Unit (OTU) overturned when landing	
17 October 1944	Wellington X3879 of No.29 Operational Training Unit (OTU) crashed while force-landing at Bitteswell, following engine failure. Crew were unhurt	
5 March 1945	Boeing B-17 Flying Fortress 44-6464 612 Bomb Squadron, 401 Bomb Group crashed after the crew baled out	
17 April 1945	Wellington NC667 of No.105 Operational Training Unit (OTU) crash-landed in the circuit after engine failure	
11 May 1945	Wellington NC713 of No.105 Operational Training Unit (OTU) crashed on approach to Bitteswell after engine failure. The 3 crew were all killed	
23 June 1945	Wellington LP822 of No.105 Operational Training Unit (OTU) overshot landing at Bitteswell and was damaged beyond repair	
7 July 1945	Wellington HE908 of No.105 Operational Training Unit (OTU) belly landed at Bitteswell after colliding with an Oxford in the air. There were no injuries	
18 May 1954	Westland Wyvern VZ747 crashed at Pailton during engine-out tests. Armstrong-Siddeley's chief test pilot, Mr E S Griffiths, was killed	
14 August 1954	Hawker Hunter F.2 WN905 destroyed while making a test flight from Bitteswell. Port leg of undercarriage fell away while making a high speed run. Pilot ejected successfully.	
10 November 1954	English Electric Canberra B.2 WD933 crash landed and overturned. Crew survived	
21 November 1958	Fairey Gannet AS.1 WN345 belly landed after nose wheel did not fully deploy. No injuries	

Death of Sidney Cook

Sidney Cook was an aeronautical engineer employed by Armstrong Whitworth Aircraft. On 5 January 1949 he was working on a Meteor which was undergoing ground tests when he was drawn into the port engine. The engine was shut down immediately and he was taken to hospital, but he died the same day.

Death of Hugh Reeves

Hugh Reeves was a British inventor and engineer. He was involved in a project to reduce noise in jet engines. On 25 October 1955 he was carrying out tests at RAF Bitteswell on a Hawker Hunter Mark V fitted with a Sapphire engine, when he was suddenly drawn into the intake of the silencer and was killed.

== Current use ==
In 1984 the airfield was sold to Doug Arnold to store some of his collection of "Warbirds of Great Britain" classic aircraft, including several Spitfires, a P-51D Mustang, a B-17G Flying Fortress and a Lancaster. It was also used for two Drag Racing meets in 1985. In 1987 it was sold for development as a Distribution Park.

The airfield is now a large business park called Magna Park in which many roads have names relating to aircraft e.g. Wellington Parkway, Buccaneer Way, Hunter Boulevard and Vulcan Way.
