= No. 301 Polish Bomber Squadron =

Polish World War II bomber squadron

No. 301 (Pomeranian) Squadron RAF
- Emblem of No. 301 Squadron (1945)
- Active: 22 July 1940 – 7 April 1943; 7 November 1944 – 10 December 1946
- Country: United Kingdom
- Allegiance: (Poland) Polish government in exile
- Branch: Royal Air Force
- Type: heavy bomber unit
- Role: aerial bombardment & special operations
- Size: about 500
- Part of: No. 1 Group RAF
- Nickname: Pomeranian; Ziemi Pomorskiej – Obrońców Warszawy
- Patron: Land of Pomerania & Defenders of Warsaw
- Anniversaries: 14 September
- Engagements: Operation Sea Lion, Operation Millennium, Operation Intonation, Operation Response, Operation Revenge, Battle of the Ruhr, Warsaw Uprising

Insignia
- Squadron Codes: GR (July 1940 – April 1943, November 1944 – December 1946)

Aircraft flown
- Bomber: Fairey Battle; Vickers Wellington
- Transport: Handley Page Halifax; Consolidated Liberator; Vickers Warwick

No. 301 Polish Bomber Squadron "Land of Pomerania" (Polish: 301 Dywizjon Bombowy "Ziemi Pomorskiej") was a Polish Air Force squadron formed in Great Britain as part of an agreement between the Polish government-in-exile and the United Kingdom in 1940. It was one of 15 squadrons of the Polish Air Force in exile that served alongside the Royal Air Force in World War II. It was a bomber unit from 1940 to 1943, and special duties squadron from 1944 until it was disbanded in 1946. It operated from RAF airfields in the United Kingdom and Italy.

== History ==
=== No. 301 Squadron (Bomber Command) ===
Before the outbreak of World War II, the Polish government signed an agreement with the Royal Air Force which stipulated in part that should war break out with Germany two Polish bomber squadrons would be created on British soil, with an additional two squadrons formed en cadre. During the German and Soviet invasion of Poland in September 1939 the country was overrun too quickly to allow for these units to be formed. Polish airmen who were able to escape Poland got to France rather than England, and were incorporated into the Polish air units being established there. Only 300 airmen and 2,000 ground crew arrived in the United Kingdom, starting from December 1939. With the fall of France the following spring Polish airmen began arriving in the United Kingdom in larger numbers.

Polish airmen were initially stationed at a military camp in Eastchurch. On 11 June 1940 the Air Ministry agreed to form two Polish bomber squadrons first. On 1 July 1940, No. 300 Polish Bomber Squadron was created. It was the first of such Polish air units. Three weeks later a second Polish bomber unit, No. 301 (Polish) Squadron was formed on 22 July at RAF Bramcote. It was first planned, that this unit would take over traditions and airmen of Polish pre-war 4th Aviation Regiment in Toruń in Pomerania region, but this policy was abandoned when more airmen arrived from France (the first commander Roman Rudkowski was from the 4th Aviation Regiment). The Squadron however unofficially used a badge of pre-war 41st Reconnaissance Eskadra from the 4th Regiment. Only on 30 June 1942 the unit was given the Polish name Ziemi Pomorskiej (of Land of Pomerania).

301 (Polish) Squadron was initially commanded by podpułkownik (W/Cdr) Roman Rudkowski, and was equipped with 16 Fairey Battle light bombers. The unit had 24 all Polish three-men aircrews. Maintenance and servicing of the aircraft should have been performed by 180 ground crewmen, but in reality in July 1940 there were less than 90 (the ground crew were mostly Polish as well). On 17 August 1940 the squadron was attached to No. 1 (Bomber) Group RAF, along with No. 300 (Polish) Squadron, and on 28 August was relocated to RAF Swinderby. The squadron flew its first combat mission on 14 September 1940. Three aircraft took part in a night bombing raid against German invasion barges intended for Operation Sea Lion, which had been collected at Boulogne. The date of the raid was later declared the date of the squadron's feast. The squadron suffered its first combat loss on 25 September 1940 when one of their Fairey Battles crashed over England (the loss was attributed to German night fighter, but a friendly fire incident was also suggested). In the following weeks the squadron bombed ports of Boulogne, Calais and Ostend without losses, performing a last mission on 15 October 1940.

On 20 October 1940 the squadron was withdrawn from active service and re-equipped with heavier Vickers Wellington Mk IC bomber, with a crew of six instead of three. Crew training in night flying and use of the new aircraft proceeded through mid-December. Ground crew support for the squadron was expanded, however it did not reach British norms and amounted to some 220 men. On 22 December, the squadron's first mission in the Wellington (and the only that year) was flown against oil refinery facilities in Antwerp (three aircraft). In total, in 1940 44 missions were performed, with one Fairey Battle crew killed in action. Following a raid on Bremen on the night of 1 January 1941, the squadron was shaken when bad weather and poor visibility resulted in the loss of 3 of their aircraft and 11 airmen when the planes crashed while attempting to come down through a snowstorm at RAF Waddington. Wet ground made Swinderby airfield unsuitable for use, and the entire squadron was grounded (from February it operated temporarily from other airfields).

After several weeks the weather improved and 301 Squadron rejoined the bombing campaign over France and Germany. Targets struck included, among others, Bremen, Hamburg, Cologne, Brest and Essen. On 17 April 1941 three crews took part in bombing of Berlin for the first time. On 18 July 1941 the two Polish bomber squadrons were moved to RAF Hemswell. In 1941 the squadron's aircraft undertook 436 missions, with a loss of 9 crews. On 12 February 1942 the squadron took part in an exceptional daylight operation against Channel Dash of German battleships, but did not find targets due to bad weather. On 28 March 1942, during a raid against Lübeck, one crew shot down Junkers Ju 88 night fighter. On the night of 30–31 May 1942, fourteen aircraft took part in a thousand-bomber raid against Cologne (Operation Millennium), without losses. This was Arthur Harris' first large formation raid. On the night of 2–3 June the squadron took part in the second thousand-bomber raid on Essen, losing one crew, but in another smaller scale Essen raid on 5–6 June two crews were lost. On 25–26 June fourteen crews bombed Bremen in the last thousand-aircraft raid, losing a crew of the squadron commander Stanisław Krzystyniak (taken prisoner). On 2–3 July another two crews were lost over Bremen, with the new squadron commander Maj. Maksymilian Brzozowski, who was taken prisoner as well. Over the night of 21–22 July, another two crews were lost to enemy flak and night fighters over Duisburg. In total, six crews were lost in June and five in July 1942, making these months the worst in the squadron's history.

From end of May 1942 the squadron also performed low-level night mining sorties against German waters, in addition to the airwar over Germany. After one loss in August and two losses in October in such sorties, the squadron temporarily had only 6 experienced crews and 6 in training or incomplete ones. On 20–21 November and 9–10 December 1942 the squadron took part in raids against Turin in Italy. In 1942 in total it performed 739 missions, losing 24 crews. In first months 1943 it continued operations, and from 5 March 1943 participated in the Battle of the Ruhr, but it was only able to send 5-6 aircraft a night. The squadron's last raid was performed against Bochum on 29–30 March 1943. In 1943 it undertook 107 missions, losing one crew.

Because of losses suffered in 1942 and limited possibility of Polish replacements, in March Polish and British authorities decided to disband the unit and transfer the crews and ground crew mainly to No. 300 Polish Bomber Squadron, which was undergoing a conversion to Avro Lancaster heavy bombers. On 1 April 1943 the squadron was withdrawn from operation, and on 7 April 1943 reduced to a sole number. In Bomber Command the squadron had completed 1326 aircraft missions in total, dropping 3,217,553 pounds of bombs (1,470 tons) and 499,500 pounds of mines (228 tons), losing 35 crews. 439 Polish airmen served through this period. 139 of them were killed in action (including five in training crashes), 55 were taken prisoner of war (two of whom were murdered after Stalag Luft III escape: Włodzimierz Kolanowski and Paweł Tobolski). The airmen were awarded with 153 Virtuti Militari 5th class crosses, 8 Distinguished Flying Crosses and 9 Distinguished Flying Medals.

=== C Flight No. 138 Squadron / No. 1586 Flight ===
From October 1941 several Polish volunteer crews, among others from No. 301 Squadron, were attached to the RAF Tempsford-based No. 138 Squadron RAF, performing special duty operations over occupied Europe. After a reorganisation of bomber squadrons, C Flight was formed on 1 April 1943 in that squadron, consisting of Polish airmen and ground crew. Part of the ground crew came from disbanded No. 301 Squadron. The flight was viewed by Polish authorities as a successor of No. 301 Squadron. It had seven crews and operated three Handley Page Halifax and three Consolidated Liberator special transport bombers. On 4 November 1943, C Flight, No. 138 Squadron RAF became No.1586 (Polish Special Duties) Flight RAF at RAF Derna in Libya. (according to Polish sources, at Sidi Amor, Tunisia).

It was still named locally by their ex 301 crews and Polish authorities as No. 301 Squadron Land of Pomerania. On 22 December 1943, the Polish flight was transferred to Campo Cassale near Brindisi, Italy, from where it flew special operations duties over occupied Europe. An effort was undertaken to supply Polish insurgents after the start of the Warsaw Uprising in August 1944. Flights to central Poland were especially difficult, lasting up to eleven hours. To honour a commitment of crews, on 15 September 1944 Polish C-in-C Kazimierz Sosnkowski gave the No. 301 Squadron an additional name: Obrońców Warszawy (Defenders of Warsaw).

=== No. 301 Squadron (special duties / Transport Command) ===
On 7 November 1944, the unit was reformed at Brindisi, Italy, when No. 1586 Flight was renamed back to 301 Squadron. The squadron operated the Handley Page Halifax and Consolidated Liberator until February 1945, flying supply missions to occupied Europe. The last flight to Poland was accomplished on 28 December 1944. On 28 February 1945 the squadron was subordinated to RAF Transport Command, and on 15 March 1945 returned to RAF Blackbushe, England, to operate the Vickers Warwick. In 1946, the squadron re-equipped with the Handley Page Halifax again until 301 Squadron was disbanded at RAF Chedburgh on 18 December 1946.

Crews of C Flight No. 138 Squadron, No. 1586 Flight and No. 301 Squadron performed 1335 special duties missions totaling 9,933 flight hours (including 423 missions in 3,892 flight hours to Poland), dropping 1,577 tons of supplies and paradropping 693 men. Losses were 167 killed in action; 18 missing in action; and 49 prisoners of war (33 and a half crews), mostly in flights to Poland (24 crews).

Thus, 301 Squadron was in fact two completely different units, with two different roles and different aircraft types; one operated bombers, the other performed transport special duties. With the closure of 301 (bomber) Squadron, most crews and aircraft joined another Polish bomber squadron (No. 300) losing their original hexagonal griffin emblem to adopt the 300 Squadron chevron. The remaining 301 crews moved to a completely different unit, No. 138 transport squadron. Later, they used a new circular 301 emblem which included the original 301 Pomeranian griffin.

== Patch ==
Initially the bomber squadron's unofficial insignia was a pre-war insignia of the 41st Reconnaissance Eskadra from the 4th Air Regiment. It featured a red griffin "rampant" (occasionally drawn "passant") on white pentagonal shield. The griffin is the symbol of Pomerania. It was painted on Wellington aircraft from mid-1941 to mid-1942. Only in July 1945 the re-established squadron received an official badge. After the re-establishment of the 301 Squadron in 1944, it received a new double name of Land of Pomerania - Defenders of Warsaw. Because of that, the new patch featured a circular shield with the golden crowned White Eagle of Poland, with a griffin "passant" at the lower left and the Mermaid of Warsaw syrenka, the Coat of Arms of Warsaw on the lower right.

== Commanding officers ==
Officers commanding No. 301 Squadron

From	To	Name
22 July 1940	26 July 1941	W/Cdr Roman Rudkowski
26 July 1941	1 April 1942	W/Cdr Witold Piotrowski
1 April 1942	26 June 1942	W/Cdr Stanisław Krzystyniak (MIA, POW)
26 June 1942	3 July 1942	S/Ldr Maksymilian Brzozowski (MIA, POW)
3 July 1942	16 July 1942	F/Lt Stanisław Doliński (acting)
16 July 1942	23 September 1942	W/Cdr Henryk Kołodziejek
23 September 1942	7 April 1943	W/Cdr Adam Dąbrowa
C Flight No. 138 Squadron / No. 1586 Flight / No. 301 Squadron:
1 April 1943	14 June 1944	S/Ldr Stanisław Król
14 June 1944	6 May 1945	S/Ldr / W/Cdr Eugeniusz Arciuszkiewicz
6 May 1945		W/Cdr Teofil Pożyczka

RAF advisor was S/ldr C.G. Skinner.

== Aircraft operated ==
Aircraft operated by 301 Squadron
From	To	Aircraft	Version
24 July 1940	November 1940	Fairey Battle	Mk I
20 October 1940	August 1941	Vickers Wellington	Mk IA (for training)
31 October 1940	December 1941	Vickers Wellington	Mk IC
August 1941	March 1943	Vickers Wellington	Mk IV
1 April 1943		Handley Page Halifax; Consolidated Liberator	Mk II, Mk V Mk V, Mk VI
15 March 1945		Vickers Warwick	C Mk III

== See also ==
- Polish Air Forces in France and Great Britain
- Military history of Poland during World War II
- List of Royal Air Force aircraft squadrons

== Notes and references ==
- Wacław Król (1982). Polskie dywizjony lotnicze w Wielkiej Brytanii (in Polish). Warsaw: Wydawnictwo MON. pp. 41–46. ISBN 83-11-07695-2.
- Hodyra, Piotr (2016). 301 Dywizjon Bombowy 1940-1943 (in Polish). Warsaw: Oficyna Wydawnicza Alma-Press. ISBN 978-83-7020-664-2.
