= Henryk Pietrzak =

Polish fighter ace

- Born: 6 March 1914; Ruda Pabianicka
- Died: 28 January 1990 (aged 75)
- Military career
- Allegiance: Poland; France; United Kingdom
- Branch: Polish Air Force; France Armée de l'Air; Royal Air Force
- Service number: P-1915
- Units: No. 306 Polish Fighter Squadron; No. 315 Polish Fighter Squadron; No. 309 Polish Fighter-Reconnaissance Squadron
- Conflicts: Polish Defensive War, World War II
- Awards: Virtuti Militari; Cross of Valour; Distinguished Flying Cross (UK)

Henryk Pietrzak after the 500th victory

Henryk Pietrzak (b. 6 March 1914 – 28 January 1990) was a Polish fighter ace of the Polish Air Force in World War II.

== Biography ==
Pietrzak joined the Polish Air Force in 1933, as a member of the 4th Air Regiment where he was flying as a pilot of the Polish 114th Fighter Escadrille Polish 114th Fighter Escadrille and during the Invasion of Poland, he was an instructor in the Central Flying School Centrum Wyszkolenia Lotnictwa nr 1 later flew fighters with the Free French Air Force's GC III/9 squadron.

He joined No. 306 Polish Fighter Squadron as a Sergeant Pilot in August 1941, flying Hawker Hurricanes and Supermarine Spitfires, and was commissioned the following year, eventually becoming a squadron leader. On 31 December 1942 while flying a Spitfire Mk IX (Serial No. EN128) he scored the 500th victory for the UK-based Polish Air Force in the war and was later decorated by Polish President Władysław Raczkiewicz. After starting a second tour with 306 Sqn he joined 315 Polish Fighter Squadron from July 1944 until October 1944, flying P-51 Mustang IIIs. He was awarded the DFC in August 1944.

His score was 7 ( and 2 shared) claimed destroyed and 2 damaged. All his victims were German fighter planes: 3 Messerschmitt Bf 109s and 4.5 Focke-Wulf Fw 190s. He is also credited with destroying four V-1 flying bombs.

He settled in England after the war, commanding 309 Polish Fighter-Reconnaissance Squadron from July 1945 to January 1947, subsequently leaving the Airforce to become a farmer in Suffolk.

== Awards ==
Virtuti Militari, Silver Cross - 10 February 1943
Cross of Valour, four times
Air Medal for the War of 1939–45
Distinguished Flying Cross (United Kingdom) - 9 February 1945
