= No. 305 Polish Bomber Squadron =

No. 305 (Ziemia Wielkopolska) Polish Bomber Squadron
- 305 Squadron logo
- Active: 29 August 1940 – 6 January 1947
- Country: United Kingdom
- Allegiance: Poland
- Branch: Royal Air Force
- Role: Bomber Squadron
- Part of: RAF Bomber Command; Second Tactical Air Force
- Nickname(s): Wielpolska

Commanders
- Notable commanders: Bolesław Orliński

Insignia
- Squadron codes: SM (August 1940 – January 1947)

No. 305 Polish Bomber Squadron "Ziemia Wielkopolska" ("Land of Greater Poland") (Polish: 305 Dywizjon Bombowy "Ziemi Wielkopolskiej im. Marszałka Józefa Piłsudskiego") was a Polish bomber squadron formed in Great Britain as part of an agreement between the Polish Government in Exile and the United Kingdom in 1940. It was one of 15 squadrons of the Polish Air Force in exile that served alongside the Royal Air Force in World War II. It operated under RAF operational command, and flew from airbases in the United Kingdom.

== History ==
The last of the Polish bomber squadrons to be created under RAF command, 305 Squadron was formed at RAF Bramcote, Warwickshire on 29 August 1940. It was at first equipped with obsolescent Fairey Battle light bombers, but was re-equipped in November 1940 with twin-engine Vickers Wellington medium bombers. The unit began operational flying in April 1941. Its first mission was bombing of petrol and fuel storage tanks at Rotterdam in the night from 25 to 26 April 1941. Between June 1941 and August 1943 the Squadron was based at RAF Ingham. There are many diaries and recollections on these events kept by a W/O pilot named Bogdan Józef Engel who was awarded the following VM V kl., 4xKW, 2xML, DFM.

In August 1943 the Squadron was moved to RAF Swanton Morley and thereafter ceased its affiliation with RAF Bomber Command; instead, it was absorbed into the freshly formed Second Tactical Air Force, a specialized arm of the RAF that was centered on tactical air strikes on vital enemy targets (such as bridges, supply trains, etc.) in the European Continent.

During this period, 305 Squadron was transferred to No. 2 Group RAF and converted briefly to North American Mitchell medium bombers before adopting the De Havilland Mosquito FB.VI, the aircraft that the Squadron operated for the remainder of the European campaign. Through 1944, the 305 was stationed at RAF Lasham in England and then briefly at RAF Hartford Bridge before moving to the Epinoy airfield in France in November 1944. During the Normandy Landings, the squadron destroyed 13,000,000 litres of the German fuel stored near Nancy, France. The squadron performed its last mission exactly four years after their first, in the night of 25 to 26 April 1945. After the hostilities ended, the Squadron continued to operate in Germany as part of the occupation forces and, after a brief return to Britain, was finally disbanded formally on 6 January 1947 at RAF Faldingworth, having already given up its aircraft on 25 November 1946.

== Aircraft operated ==
From	To	Aircraft	Version
September 1940	November 1940	Fairey Battle	Mk.I
November 1940	July 1941	Vickers Wellington	Mk.Ic
July 1941	August 1942	Vickers Wellington	Mk.II
August 1942	May 1943	Vickers Wellington	Mk.IV
May 1943	September 1943	Vickers Wellington	Mk.X
September 1943	October 1943	North American Mitchell	Mk.II
December 1943	November 1946	de Havilland Mosquito	FB.VI

== See also ==
- Polish Air Forces in France and Great Britain
- Military history of Poland during World War II
- Szczepan Ścibior (1903–52); pilot and political prisoner
