= Teofil Pożyczka =

Teofil Pożyczka (1912 – c. 1974) was a Polish pilot during World War II. He served as technical officer in the Centralne Warsztaty Lotnicze (Central Aerial Works) in the Polish September Campaign of 1939.

== Biography ==
Pożyczka was a graduate of the second promotion of the Szkoła Podchorążych Lotnictwa (technical group), and was nominated Lieutenant in the corps of aviation officers: engineering group, 1 October 1937, lok. 13.

Born on 27 April 1912 in Radom, he was unmarried before the war, but had a fiancée. He finished primary education in 1924, and Lyceum in 1933 in the mathematical-natural direction. Additionally, he attended the City Industrial School named after Jan Kiliński (Miejska Szkoła Przemysłowa im. Kilińskiego) in Radom in the mechanical direction (1927). He worked as a rifle assembly technician from 1 August 1927 to 1 September 1929 in the public weapon factory in Radom. In 1936 he finished the School of Officer Cadets in Warsaw — engineering group. His last war ranks were a major and a British W/Cdr. He was a pilot and technical officer, and flew in total around 900 hours, in majority on two and multi-motor aircraft.

From 1 April 1944 to 1 February 1945 he was Commander of the No. 300 "Land of Masovia" Bomber Squadron, and from 6 May 1945 to 18 December 1946 he was Commander of the No. 301 Polish Bomber Squadron — 1586 squadron For Special Tasks.

=== After the war ===
After the war he remained in Great Britain, where he ran his own shop. He died as a result of disease at age 62 in the Ipswich hospital in Suffolk, and was also buried there.

== Awards ==
- Virtuti Militari
- Krzyż Walecznych x4
- Distinguished Service Order (DSO)
- Distinguished Flying Cross (United Kingdom) (DFC)

== Shortened course of service ==
- 1 September 1939: CWL Dęblin — Officer of technical oversight ppor. (lieutenant).
- 29 October 1939: Salon France
- 27 January 1940: Eastchurch in Great Britain — awaiting allocation
- 15 May 1940: training as pilot
- 11 June 1940: training as pilot
- 7 July 1940: No. 301 (P) Bomber Squadron Bramcote — participation in squadron's first combat tasks
- 20 June 1942: 18 OTU Bramcote — instructor por. (first lieutenant).
- 19 January 1944: No. 300 (P) Bomber Squadron Ingham and later Faldingworth — Commander of Squadron
- 2 February 1945: Main headquarters 1 group, Ops room - mjr.
- 2 May 1945: No. 301 Bomber Squadron, Commander of Squadron
