= No. 309 Polish Fighter-Reconnaissance Squadron =

No. 309 "Ziemi Czerwieńskiej" (Polish) Squadron
- 309 Squadron logo
- Active: 8 November 1940 – 6 January 1947
- Country: United Kingdom
- Allegiance: (Poland) Polish government in exile
- Branch: Royal Air Force
- Role: Reconnaissance squadron; later fighter squadron
- Part of: RAF Fighter Command
- Nickname: Ziemia Czerwieńska

Commanders
- Notable commanders: Henryk Pietrzak

Insignia
- Squadron Codes: AR; from 1944 WC

No. 309 "Land of Czerwień" Polish Fighter-Reconnaissance Squadron (Polish: 309 Dywizjon "Ziemi Czerwieńskiej") was a Polish squadron formed in Great Britain as part of an agreement between the Polish Government in Exile and the United Kingdom in 1940. It was one of 15 squadrons of the Polish Air Force in exile that served alongside the Royal Air Force (RAF) in World War II. It was at first a reconnaissance squadron, and later converted into a fighter squadron. It was named after the region around the city of Czerwień; which was then in southeastern Poland, and is now in western Ukraine.

== History ==
The squadron was formed in the RAF base at RAF Renfrew near Glasgow on 8 November 1940, and declared operational on 5 December 1940. It was disbanded on 9 January 1947.

== Commanders ==
From	
8 November 1940	ppłk pil. Zygmunt Pistl
12 February 1943	mjr pil. Witold Jacek Piotrowski
15 November 1943	kpt. pil. Maciej Piotrowski
3 April 1944	kpt. pil. Jerzy Gołko
9 September 1944	kpt. pil. Antoni Głowacki
7 August 1945	kpt. pil. Henryk Pietrzak

== Aircraft operated ==
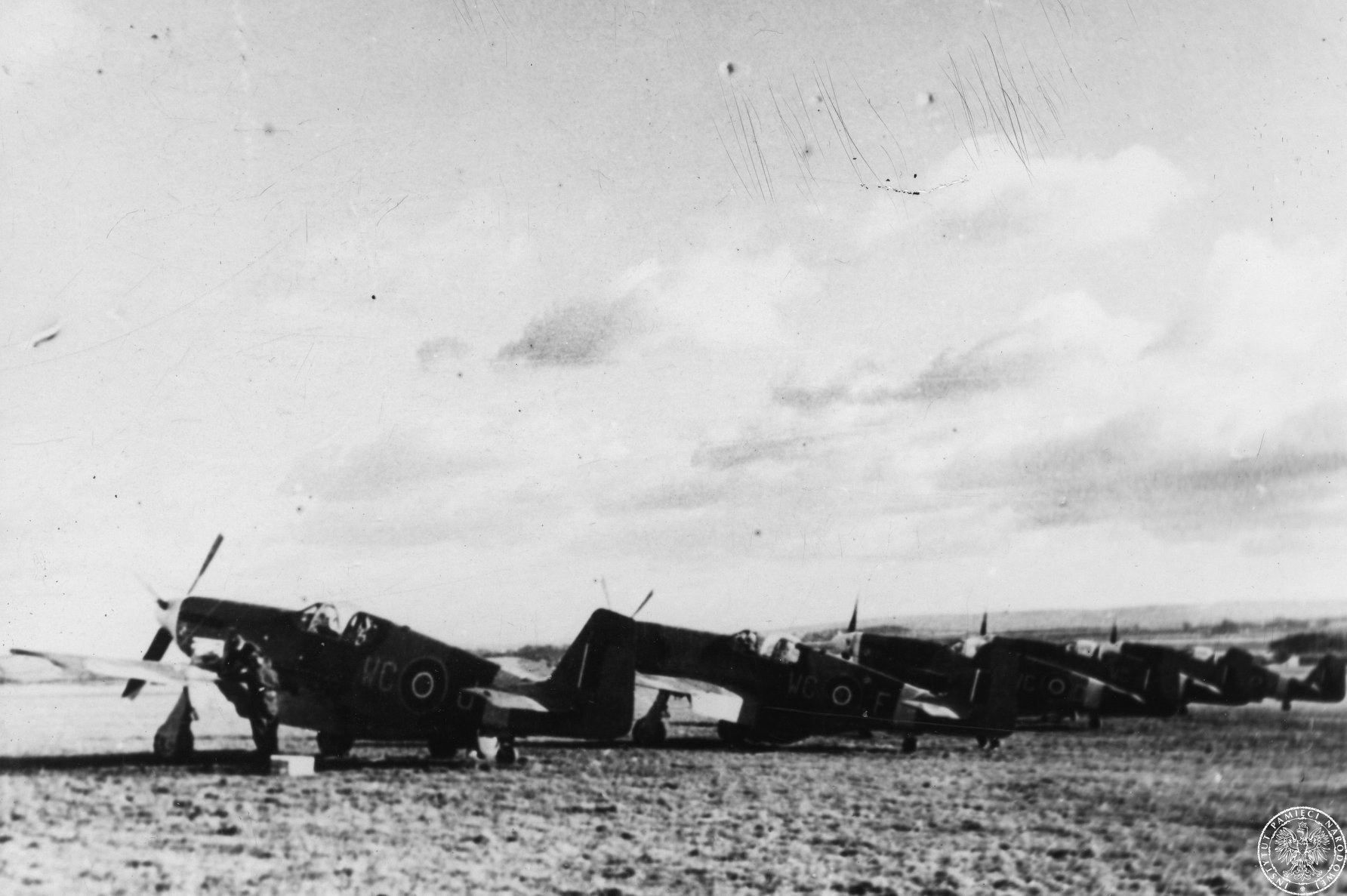
Mustang Mk.III aircraft of 309 Squadron in 1944

From	Aircraft	Version
8 November 1940	Westland Lysander	Mk.II and Mk.III
1 June 1942 (flight B)	North American Mustang	Mk.I
19 January 1944	Hawker Hurricane	Mk.IV
23 January 1944	Hawker Hurricane	Mk.IIC
1 September 1944	North American Mustang	Mk.I
20 November 1944	North American Mustang	Mk.III

== Bibliography ==
- Lewis, Peter (1968) [1959]. Squadron Histories, RFC, RNAS and RAF, Since 1912. London: Putnam. SBN 370-00022-6.
