= Polish Air Forces in France and Great Britain =

- Polskie Siły Powietrzne
- Founded: 18 May 1940
- Country: United Kingdom, France
- Allegiance: Polish government-in-exile

Insignia
- Identification symbol

- Fin flash

Aircraft flown
- Attack: Fairey Battle
- Bomber: Avro Lancaster, Vickers Wellington
- Fighter: Bloch MB.152, Caudron C.714, de Havilland Mosquito, Hawker Hurricane, North American Mustang, Supermarine Spitfire, Koolhoven FK.58, Morane-Saulnier M.S.406

The Polish Air Forces (Polish: Polskie Siły Powietrzne) was the name of the Polish Air Forces formed in France and the United Kingdom during World War II. The core of the Polish air units fighting alongside the Allies were experienced veterans of the 1939 invasion of Poland. They contributed to the Allied victory in the Battle of Britain and Allied air operations during the war.

A total of 145 Polish fighter pilots served in the RAF during the Battle of Britain, making up the largest non-British contribution. By the end of the war, around 19,400 Poles were serving in the Polish Air Forces in Great Britain and in the RAF.

== History ==
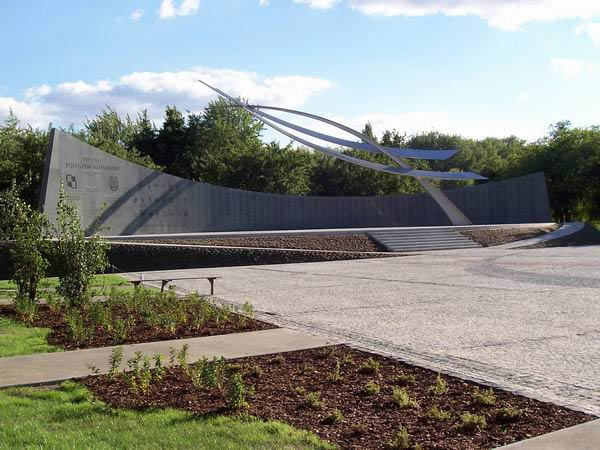
Monument to fallen Polish airmen; Warsaw, Pole Mokotowskie

After the German–Soviet invasion of Poland of 1939, most of the flying personnel and technicians of the Polish Air Force were evacuated to Romania and Hungary, after which thousands found their way to France. There, in accordance with the Franco-Polish Military Alliance of 1921 and the amendments of 1939, Polish Air Force units were to be re-created. However, the French headquarters was hesitant about creating large Polish air units, and instead most Polish pilots were attached to small units, so-called keys. Only one large unit was formed, the Groupe de Chasse polonaise I/145 stationed at Mions airfield. However, it was not until May 18, 1940, that this unit was equipped with planes – and even then these were the completely obsolete Caudron C.714 fighters. After 23 sorties the bad opinion of the plane was confirmed by the front-line pilots. It was seriously underpowered and was no match for the enemy fighters of the period. Because of that, on May 25, only a week after the plane was introduced to active service, French minister of war Guy la Chambre ordered all C.710s withdrawn. However, since the French authorities had no other planes to offer, the Polish pilots ignored the order and continued to use the planes. Although the planes were hopelessly outdated compared to the Messerschmitt Bf 109Es they faced, the Polish pilots nevertheless scored 12 confirmed and 3 unconfirmed kills in three battles between June 8 and June 11, losing 9 in the air and 9 more on the ground. Among the planes claimed shot down were four Dornier Do 17 bombers, but also three Messerschmitt Bf 109 and five Messerschmitt Bf 110 fighters. The rest of the Polish units were using the slightly more reliable Morane-Saulnier M.S.406 fighter. A small improvised Polish unit at Salon and Clermont-Aulnat (now Clermont-Ferrand Auvergne Airport) operated the equally inadequate Koolhoven F.K.58 from 30 May commanded by Captain Walerian Jasionowski.

The Polish Air Force in France had 86 aircraft with one and a half of the squadrons fully operational, and the remaining two and a half in various stages of training. Altogether, the Polish pilots flew 714 sorties during the Battle of France. According to Jerzy Cynk, they shot down 51.9 enemy planes (summing fraction kills – 57 kills including 16 shared victories), in addition to 3 unconfirmed kills and 6 3/5 damaged. According to Bartłomiej Belcarz they shot down 53 aircraft, including 19 kills shared with the French. These 53 victories makes 8% of 693 allied air victories in the French campaign. At the same time they lost 44 planes (in combat, accidents and on the ground) and lost 8 fighter pilots in combat, 1 missing, and 4 in accidents.

=== In Britain ===
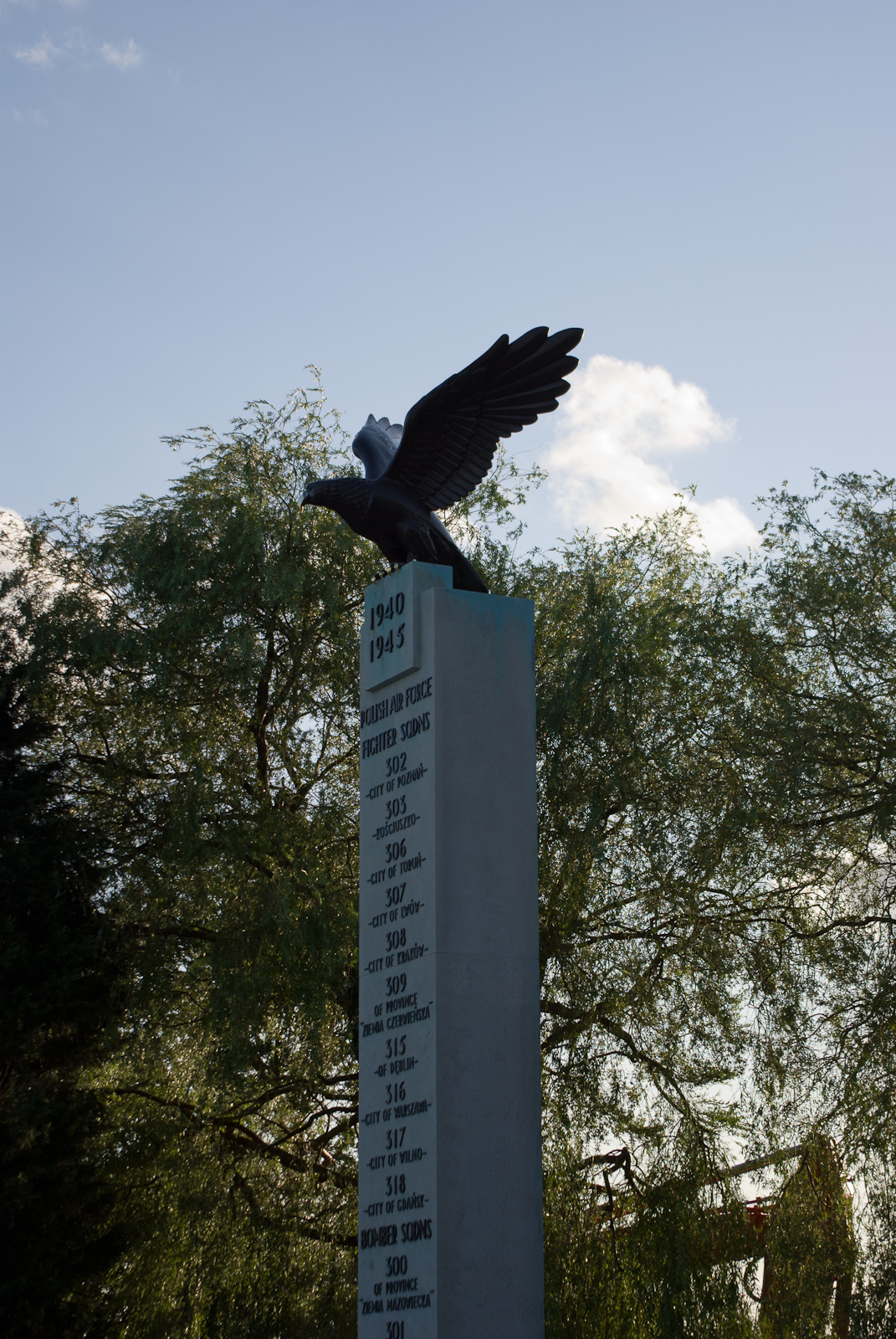
Polish War Memorial, London

After the collapse of France in 1940, a large part of the Polish Air Force contingent was withdrawn to the United Kingdom. However, the RAF Air Staff were not willing to accept the independence and sovereignty of Polish forces.

Air Marshal Sir Hugh Dowding later admitted he had been "a little doubtful" at first about the Polish airmen. The British government informed General Sikorski that, at the end of the war, Poland would be charged for all costs involved in maintaining Polish forces in Britain. Initial plans for the airmen greatly disappointed them: they would only be allowed to join the Royal Air Force Volunteer Reserve, wear British uniforms, fly British flags and be required to take two oaths, one to the Polish government and the other to George VI; each officer was required to have a British counterpart, and all Polish pilots were to begin with the rank of "pilot officer", the lowest rank for a commissioned officer in the RAF. Only after posting would anyone be promoted to a higher grade. Because of this, the majority of highly experienced Polish pilots had to wait in training centres, learning English Command procedures and language, while the RAF suffered heavy losses due to lack of experienced pilots. On June 11, 1940, a preliminary agreement was signed by the Polish and British governments and soon the British authorities finally allowed for the creation of two bomber squadrons and a training centre as part of the Royal Air Force.

Dowding had been doubtful about integration of Polish pilots within British squadrons due to language issues and wanted all-Polish units. Fighter Command operated with a fully integrated air defence system for ground controlled intercept (the "Dowding System") to direct squadrons against the Luftwaffe raids and all pilots needed to be able to speak English. In August, all Polish airmen became members of the Polish Air Force, and four squadrons—two fighter (based on the Poznan and Warsaw air regiments) and two bomber—were set up. Some Polish airmen chose to stay with their British squadrons.

The first squadrons were 300 and 301 bomber squadrons and 302 and 303 fighter squadrons. The fighter squadrons, flying the Hawker Hurricane, first saw action in the third phase of the Battle of Britain in late August 1940, quickly becoming highly effective. Polish flying skills were well-developed from the invasion of Poland and being highly motivated by patriotism for revenge the pilots were regarded as fearless and sometimes bordering on reckless. Their success rates were very high in comparison to the less-experienced British Commonwealth pilots. The 303 squadron became the most efficient RAF fighter unit at that time, and RAF commanders protested when government censors refused to allow this fact to appear in the press. By late 1940 the American visitor Ralph Ingersoll reported that the Poles were "the talk of London" because of their victories. Although at first the Poles memorised basic English sentences to identify themselves if shot down over Britain to avoid being mistaken as Germans, Ingersoll wrote that such pilots returned with "a girl on each arm. They say the girls cannot resist the Poles, nor the Poles the girls". Bomber squadrons Nos. 300 and 301 started operations on 14 August 1940, attacking German invasion barges in French ports, and then attacking targets in Germany as a part of British bombing offensive.

Many Polish pilots flew in other RAF squadrons, usually given nicknames because, as Ingersoll wrote, "the Polish names, of course, are unpronounceable". Later, further Polish squadrons were created: 304 (bomber, then Coastal Command), 305 (bomber), 306 (fighter), 307 (night fighter), 308 (fighter), 309 (reconnaissance, then fighter), 315 (fighter), 316 (fighter), 317 (fighter), 318 (fighter-reconnaissance) and 663 (air observation/artillery spotting). The fighter squadrons initially flew Hurricanes, then Supermarine Spitfires, and eventually some were equipped with North American Mustangs. Night fighters used by 307 were the Boulton-Paul Defiant, Bristol Beaufighter and the de Havilland Mosquito. The bomber squadrons were initially equipped with Fairey Battles and Vickers Wellingtons, then Avro Lancasters (300 sqn), Handley Page Halifaxs and Consolidated Liberators (301 sqn) and de Havilland Mosquitos and North American Mitchells (305 sqn). 663 flew Auster AOP Mk Vs.

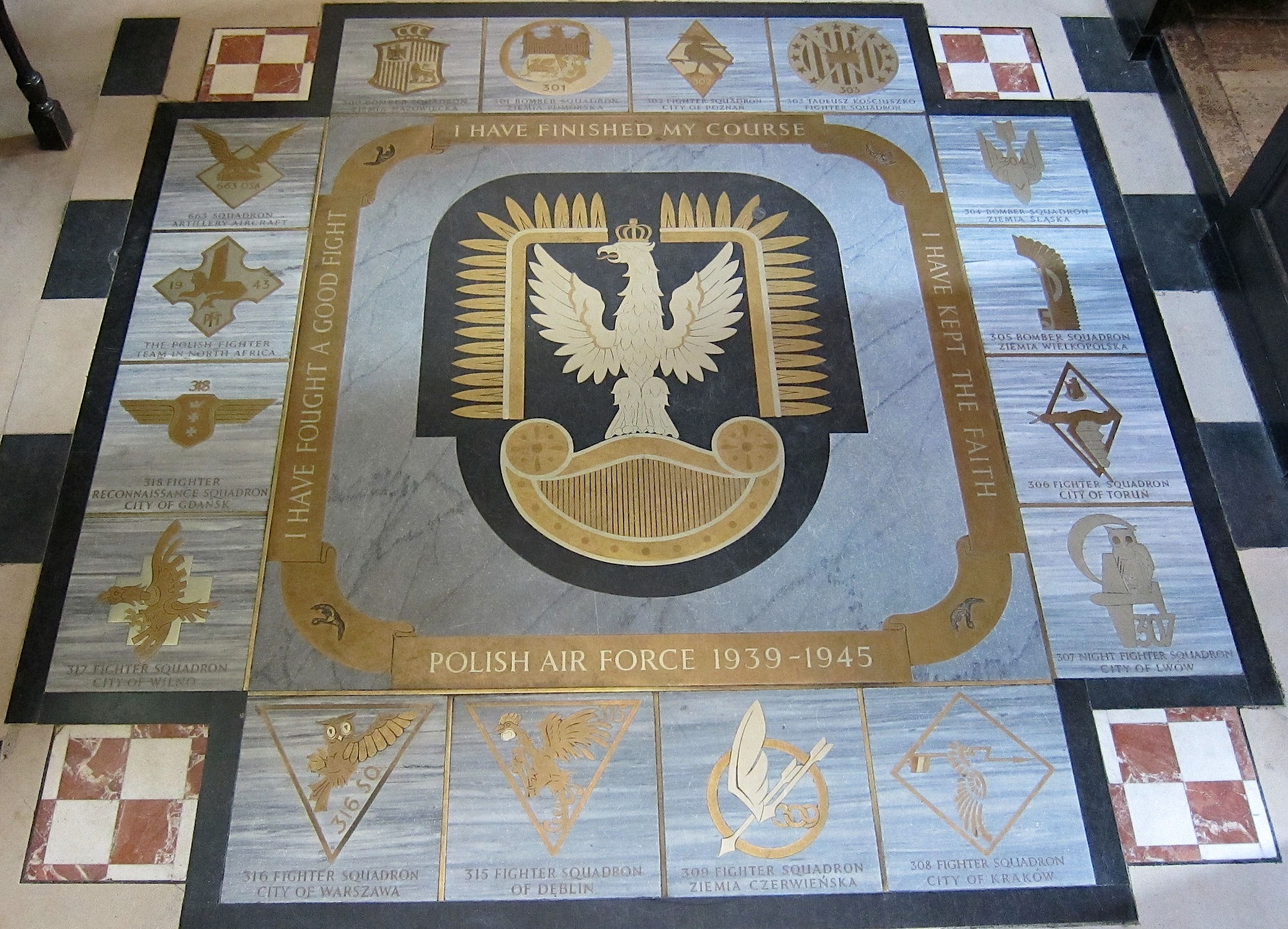
Polish Air Force memorial, St Clement Danes, London

On April 6, 1944, a further agreement was reached and the Polish Air Forces in Great Britain came under Polish command, without RAF officers. This resulted in the creation of a dedicated Polish Air Force staff college at RAF Weston-super-Mare, which remained open until April 1946.

After the war, in a changed political situation, their equipment was returned to the British. Due to the fact that Poland ended the war under Soviet occupation, only a small proportion of the pilots returned to Poland where they suffered from harassment, while the rest chose to exercise their new found right to remain in Britain post war as detailed in the UK Polish Resettlement Act 1947, in doing so they remained exiled from their native country.

A memorial to those Polish pilots killed while on RAF service was erected in 1948 at the south-eastern corner of RAF Northolt aerodrome. On the public highway, it is accessible without entering RAF areas. It is adjacent to the A4180 junction on the A40 Western Avenue; the official name for this junction is "Polish War Memorial". A large memorial to Polish Air Force squadrons in the war is situated on the floor of the north aisle of the reconstructed Wren church, St Clement Danes, London.

The Polish-American fighter ace Francis S. "Gabby" Gabreski flew his first combat missions attached to a Polish RAF squadron.

King George VI, on visiting a Polish squadron, asked a Polish airman what was the toughest thing he had to deal with in the war. The reply was "King's Regulations...."

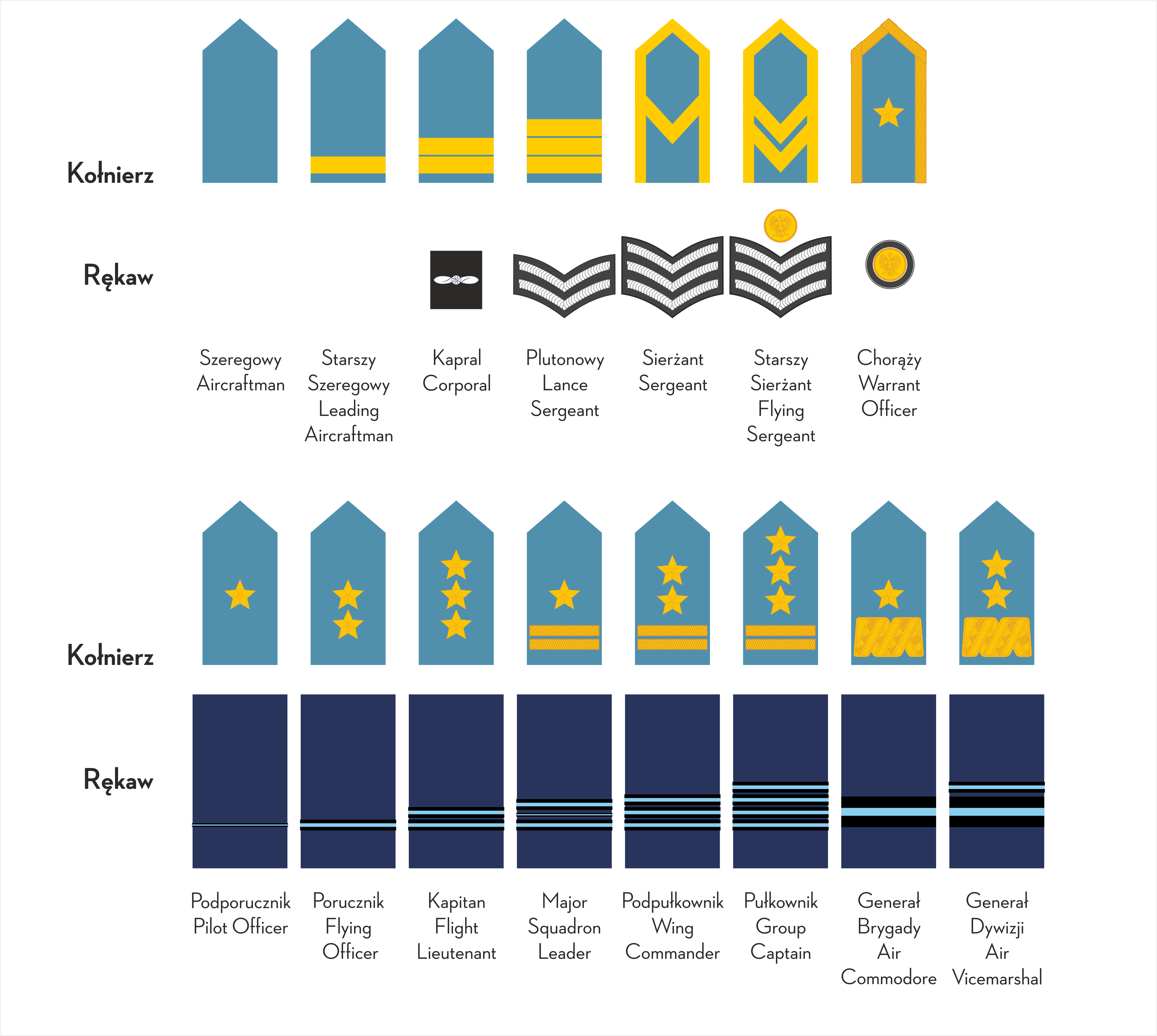
Ranks of the Polskich Sił Powietrznych 1940–1945

== Polish Volunteer Air Force squadrons' coats of arms ==
When the Polish RAF squadrons were formed, a series of badges or coats of arms were designed for each of the Polish squadrons or flying units with the exception of 945 & 929 Balloon Squadrons, 1586 Flight and 6(C) OTU.

Some of the squadron badges were based on squadron or escadrille badges of Polish flying units pre-1939 before the Second World War.

Some were long established such as 303's Kościuszko badge and some were designed specially for the large and growing number of flying units being formed in the RAF.

- 300 Squadron's badge has "CCC" meaning "300" in Roman numerals. It was the first Polish RAF squadron formed. It combines the coats of arms of both Poland and England – it has the Polish White Eagle "Orzeł Biały" (an eagle argent armed, crowned) and it has the English lion (a lion passant guardant, crowned).
- 301 Squadron was two separate squadrons with two different roles at different times and each used a different squadron badge. In July 1940, 301 Bomber Squadron was formed. It closed in March 1943 and most of their crews and aircraft were merged with 300 Squadron. The first 301 Bomber Squadron used an unofficial inverted pentagon badge with a white background and a Pomeranian red griffin rampant shield design, very similar to the coat of arms of Pomerania. The identical badge can be seen on photos of PZL.23 Karaś light bombers fighting against German invaders in September 1939. The new 301 Transport Squadron was formed in November 1944 and operated in North Africa and in Italy for Special Duties flights. It used a circular badge with a Polish Eagle, and below it – a Pomeranian red griffin passant shield – and a Maid of Warsaw "Syrena" shield, with the number "301" below. The use of the griffin refers to the earlier 301 Squadron, but it shows a griffin passant (walking) instead of the original griffin rampant.
- 302 Squadron's badge uses an old Polish design previously used for 131 and 132 Escadrilles, the closest is the blue wings version of that badge from 132 Esc. The diamond shape badge includes a red, white and blue background from both the French and UK flags and it has both the French Armée de l'Air "I/145" unit number and "302".
- 303 Squadron's badge is the same as the older Polish "Kościuszko" unit, used for 111 Escadrille in the Brygada Poscigowa (Pursuit Brigade) tasked with the defence of Warsaw. But, in the RAF badge it has "303" added below.
- 304 Squadron's badge shows a bomb and a "V" ("Fifth") reference which could be for a Polish unit, or it may refer to the fact that 304 Sqn was the fifth unit both by numerical position (300–304) and it was the fifth Polish squadron formed by date, or it may refer to "V for Victory".
- 305 Squadron's badge uses a graphic image of a hussar's wing, a letter "P" probably for Polska ("Poland") and a spear signifying launched attack and the colour roundel of the RAF and the square roundel of the Polish Air Force. The squadron number "305" is added.
- 306 Squadron's badge uses an old Polish design previously used for 141 and 142 Escadrilles. The main differences are: 141 & 142 had an inverted pentagon, 306 uses a diamond shape. Also in the 306 badge there is a bear and tree, a symbol for Warwickshire, UK (and Madrid).
- 307 Squadron's badge uses a crescent moon, an aircraft and an eagle owl derived from the heroic exploits of The Lwów Eaglets (Polish: Orlęta Lwowskie) young fighters who died defending the city of Lwow in Galicia, Poland from invading Ukrainian & Russian forces during the Polish-Ukrainian War (1918–1919). The name "Eagle Owls" is also appropriate because 307 Squadron's role was night-fighter defence.
- 308 Squadron's badge uses an old Polish design previously used for 121 Escadrille. It uses the same emblem but facing the opposite way (right instead of left) and it is now enclosed in a diamond shape.
- 315 Squadron's badge uses an old Polish design previously used for 112 Escadrille in the Brygada Poscigowa (Pursuit Brigade) tasked with the defence of Warsaw. The only difference is that it was rotated 30 degrees clockwise so the triangle is pointing down instead of left, with the bird more vertical and "315" was added.
- 316 Squadron's badge uses an old Polish design previously used for 113 Escadrille in the Brygada Poscigowa (Pursuit Brigade) tasked with the defence of Warsaw. The only difference is that it was rotated 30 degrees clockwise so the triangle is pointing down instead of left, with the owl more vertical and "316 SQ" was added.
- 317 Squadron's badge uses an old Polish design previously used for 151 and 152 Escadrilles in the pre-war Polish "Narew Army Group". The blue version of that badge for 151 Esc. is closest to the 317 Sqn. badge.
- 318 Squadron's badge uses the coat of arms of the City of Gdansk – a red shield with two white crosses and a golden crown above. The only additions are the golden wings surrounding the shield and the number "318" at the top.
- 663 Squadron's badge uses the Polish red and white chequered square "roundel" set as a diamond with a Polish eagle flying and carrying an artillery shell. It has the letters "DSA" beside the number "663".

Other squadrons:

- No. 138 Squadron including its "Polish C Flight" used the badge of the earlier RAF 138 Squadron which shows a sword cutting the reef-knot in a cord or rope, symbolising their role of liberating occupied territories during World War II.
- No. 302 Squadron inherited the traditions of previous Squadrons of the PAF such as III/3 Fighter Squadron, 131st Fighter Escadrille, Polish 132nd Fighter Escadrille and the French Armée de l'Air Groupe de Chasse G.C. I/145.
- No. 303 Squadron inherited the traditions and badge of previous Kościuszko Squadrons of the PAF such as the early Polish 7th Air Escadrille and 121st Fighter Escadrille and the later Polish 111th Fighter Escadrille.
- No. 317 Squadron inherited the traditions and badge of a previous Squadron of the PAF, the 151st Fighter Escadrille and 152nd Fighter Escadrille, part of the Narew (151) and Modlin (152) Independent Operational Groups respectively.
- No. 145 Squadron "Polish Fighting Team" uses a sphinx with a wing. It may have derived its badge and traditions via a Polish unit. The PFT squadron's commander Stanislaw Skalski was a senior officer in III-4 Pomorze (Pomerania) Squadron during the 1939 invasion of Poland. The sphinx might be a reference to their being stationed in the Western Desert (and Egypt), the wing resembles the wings worn by 16th century Polish hussars.

Badges

In the Polish Air Force, their Air Force unit badges had two versions depending on which side of the aircraft they were painted, so that the emblem was always pointing or facing forwards. So on the port (left) side, the emblem faced left (forward) and on the starboard (right) side, the emblem faced right (forward).

For the RAF Polish squadrons, there was only one design with most facing left, but 308, 316 and 663 squadrons' emblems faced right.

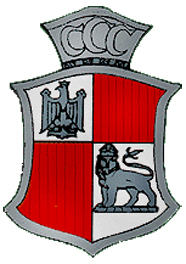
No. 300 Polish Bomber Squadron
"Land of Masovia"

No. 301 Polish Bomber Squadron
"Land of Pomerania, Defenders of Warsaw" (Note: Personnel were also part of No. 1586 Flight RAF)

No. 302 Polish Fighter Squadron
"City of Poznań"

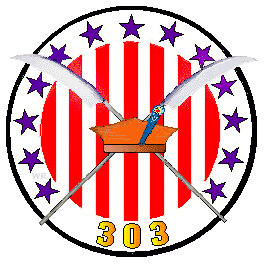
No. 303 Polish Fighter Squadron
"Kościuszko"

No. 304 Polish Bomber Squadron
"Land of Silesia – Ks. Józefa Poniatowskiego"

No. 305 Polish Bomber Squadron
"Land of Greater Poland – Marshal Józef Piłsudski"

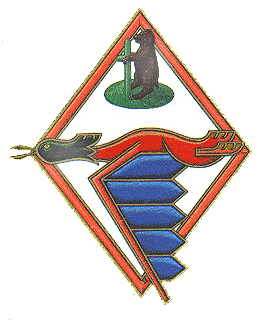
No. 306 Polish Fighter Squadron
"City of Toruń"

No. 307 Polish Night Fighter Squadron
"Lwów Eagle-owls"

No. 308 Polish Fighter Squadron
"City of Kraków"

No. 309 Polish Fighter-Reconnaissance Squadron
"Land of Czerwien"

No. 315 Polish Fighter Squadron
"City of Dęblin"

No. 316 Polish Fighter Squadron
"City of Warsaw"

No. 317 Polish Fighter Squadron
"City of Wilno"

No. 318 Polish Fighter-Reconnaissance Squadron
"City of Gdańsk"

Insignia used on 318th Fighter Squadron aircraft

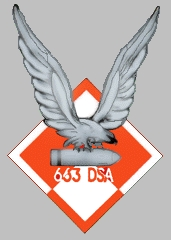
No. 663 Artillery Observation Squadron
"We Fly for the Guns"

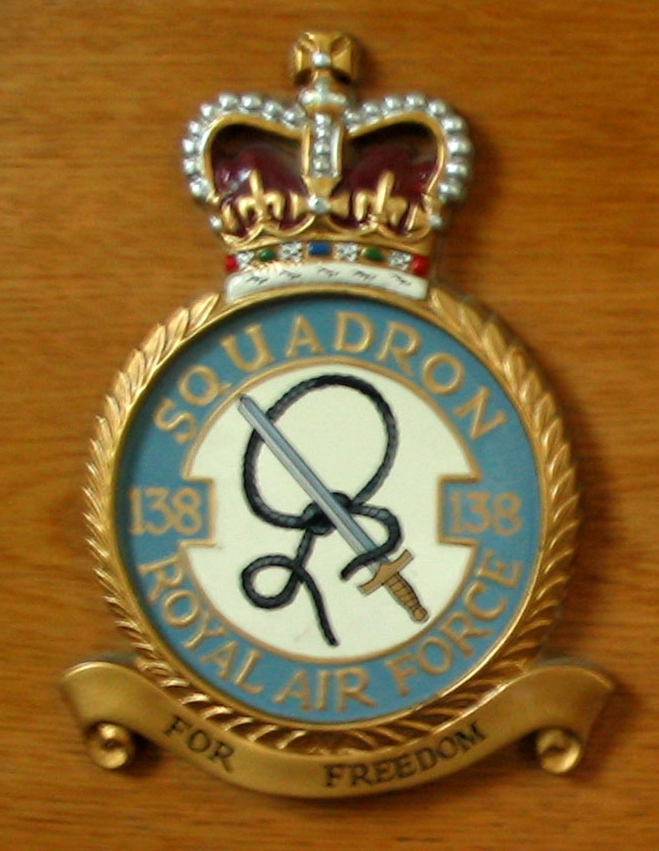
Polish Flight "C" was part of No. 138 Special Duty Squadron

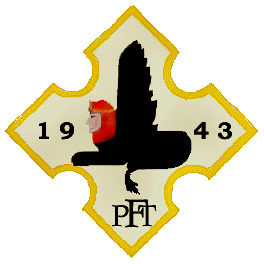
Polish Fighting Team "Skalski Circus"{attached to No. 145 RAF Squadron

== Polish volunteer wings in Allied Air forces, 1940–45 ==
=== France ===
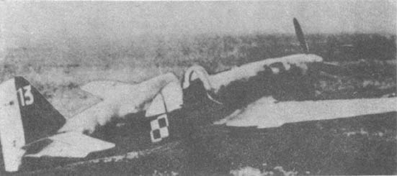
Caudron CR.714 fighter plane of Groupe de Chasse I/145, June 1940

List of Polish units based on Bartłomiej Belcarz's research and publications.

- Armée de l'Air, May 10, 1940 – Zone d´Operations Aériennes des Alpes
  - Groupe de Chasse de Varsovie at Lyon-Bron
  - Groupe de Chasse GC I/145 at Lyon-Bron and at Dreux (Bloch MB.152 and Caudron C.714)
  - Section no.1 Łaszkiewicz GC III/2
  - Section no.2 Pentz GC II/6
  - Section no.3 Sulerzycki GC III/6
  - Section no.4 Bursztyn GC III/1
  - Section no.5 Brzeziński GC I/2
  - Section no.6 Goettel GC II/7
  - Jasionowski Koolhoven Flight
  - DAT section Krasnodębski GC I/55 based at Châteaudun and Étampes
  - DAT section Skiba GC I/55
  - DAT section Kuzian based at Nantes
  - DAT section Opulski based at Romorantin
  - DAT section Krasnodębski based at Toulouse-Francazal
  - Centre d'Instruction d'Aviation de Chasse at Montpellier
  - Ecole de Pilotage No 1 (Chasse) at Etampes
  - Ecole de Pilotage at Avord
  - Centre d'Instruction at Tours
  - Depot d'Instruction de l'Aviation Polonaise at Lyon-Bron
  - Montpellier Flight

=== United Kingdom ===
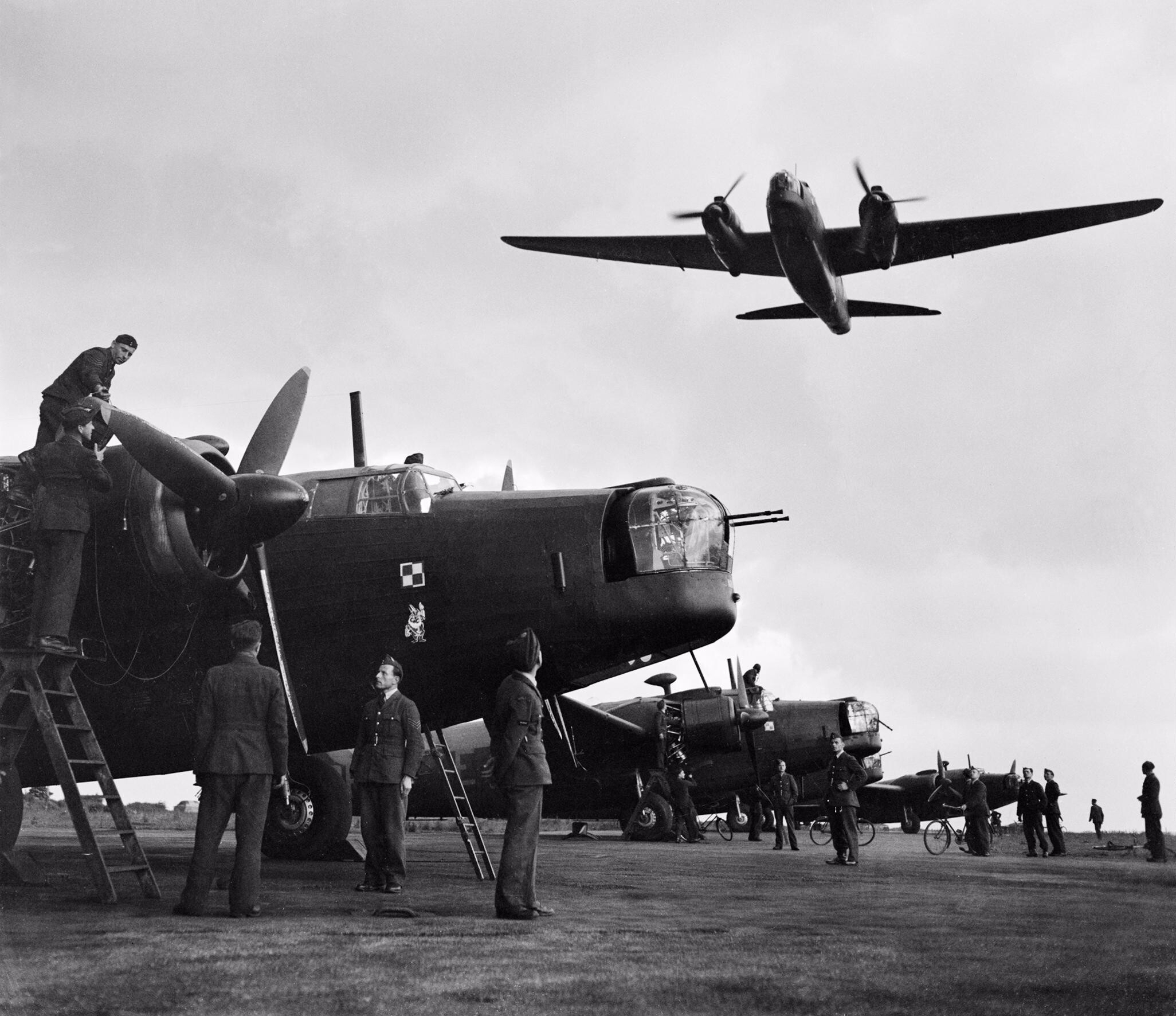
Ground crews of No. 300 Polish Bomber Squadron work on their Vickers Wellington Mark Xs at RAF Hemswell, Lincolnshire.

- Royal Air Force (Home Command), June 6, 1944
  - RAF Bomber Command
    - No. 1 Bomber Group
      - No. 300 Polish Bomber Squadron "Masovia" RAF Faldingworth (Avro Lancaster Mk. I & III, Fairey Battle Mk. 1, and Vickers Wellington MK. IC, III, IV, and X)
      - No. 301 Polish Bomber Squadron "Pomerania" RAF Faldingworth (Consolidated Liberator B Mk. III, V, and IV, Fairey Battle Mk. I, Handley Page Halifax Mk. II, V, and VIII, Vickers Warwick C Mk. I & III, and Vickers Wellington Mk. IC & IV)
- Allied Expeditionary Air Force
  - Air Defence of Great Britain
    - No. 11 (Fighter) Group
      - No. 303 Polish Fighter Squadron "Kosciuszko" Horne (Supermarine Spitfire Mk VB)
      - No. 307 Polish Fighter Squadron "City of Lwow" Church Fenton (De Havilland Mosquito Mk-NF.XIII)
  - No. 12 (Fighter) Group
    - No. 309 Polish Fighter-Reconnaissance Squadron "Czerwien" "B" (Flight) Hutton Cranswick (Hawker Hurricane Mk. IIC)
    - No. 316 Polish Fighter Squadron "City of Warsaw" RAF Coltishall (North American Mustang III)
  - No. 13 Fighter Group
    - No. 309 Polish Fighter-Reconnaissance Squadron "Czerwien" "A" (Flight) RAF Drem (Hawker Hurricane Mk. IIC)

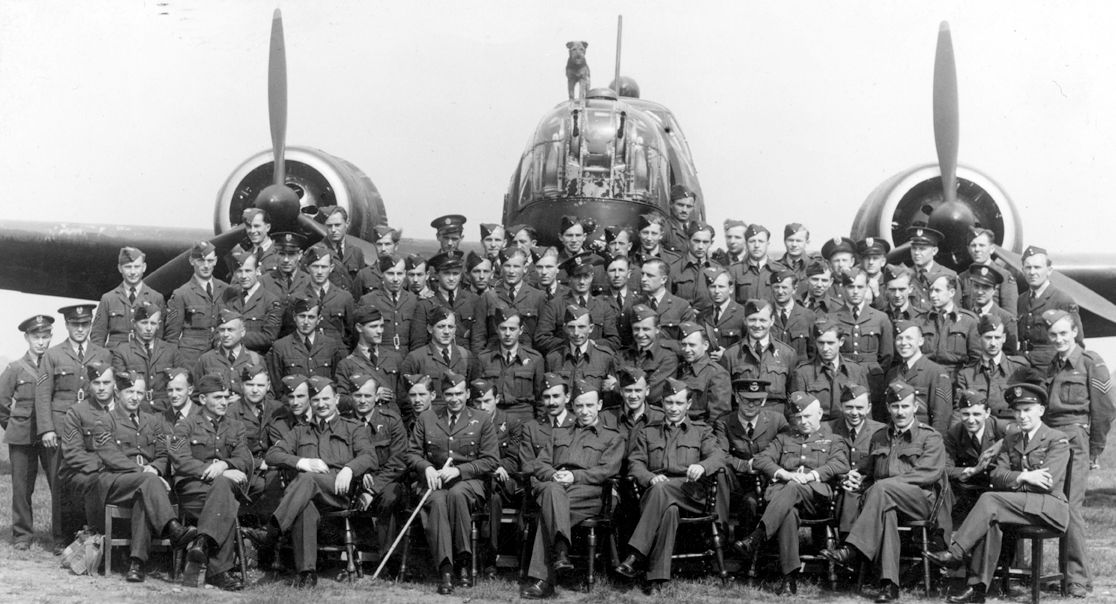
Photograph of No. 305 Polish Bomber Squadron taken in 1942 at RAF Cammeringham in Lincolnshire.

- 2nd Tactical Air Force
  - No. 305 Polish Bomber Squadron "Greater Poland" Lasham (de Havilland Mosquito F.B. Mk VI)

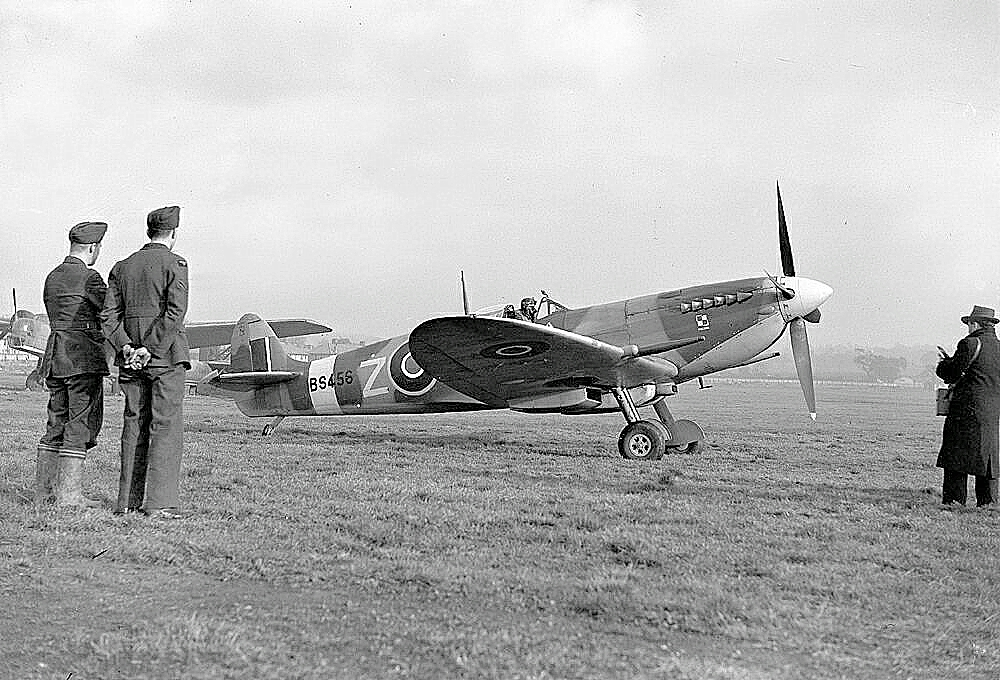
A Supermarine Spitfire Mk IXb of No. 306 Polish Fighter Squadron at RAF Northolt in 1943.

- No. 84 Group RAF
  - No. 131 Wing
    - No. 302 Polish Fighter Squadron "City of Poznan" Chailey (Supermarine Spitfire Mk. IX)
    - No. 308 Polish Fighter Squadron "City of Krakow" Chailey (Supermarine Spitfire Mk. IX)
    - No. 317 Polish Fighter Squadron "City of Wilno" Chailey (Supermarine Spitfire Mk. IX)
    - II Corps (Poland)
    - No. 318 Polish Fighter-Reconnaissance Squadron "City of Gdansk" Chailey (Supermarine Spitfire P.R. Mk. IX)
    - No. 663 Polish Artillery Observation Squadron (Italy) (British Taylorcraft Auster III, IV and V)
  - No. 133 Wing
    - No. 306 Polish Fighter Squadron "City of Torun" Coolham (North American Mustang III)
    - No. 315 Polish Fighter Squadron "City of Dęblin" Coolham (North American Mustang III)

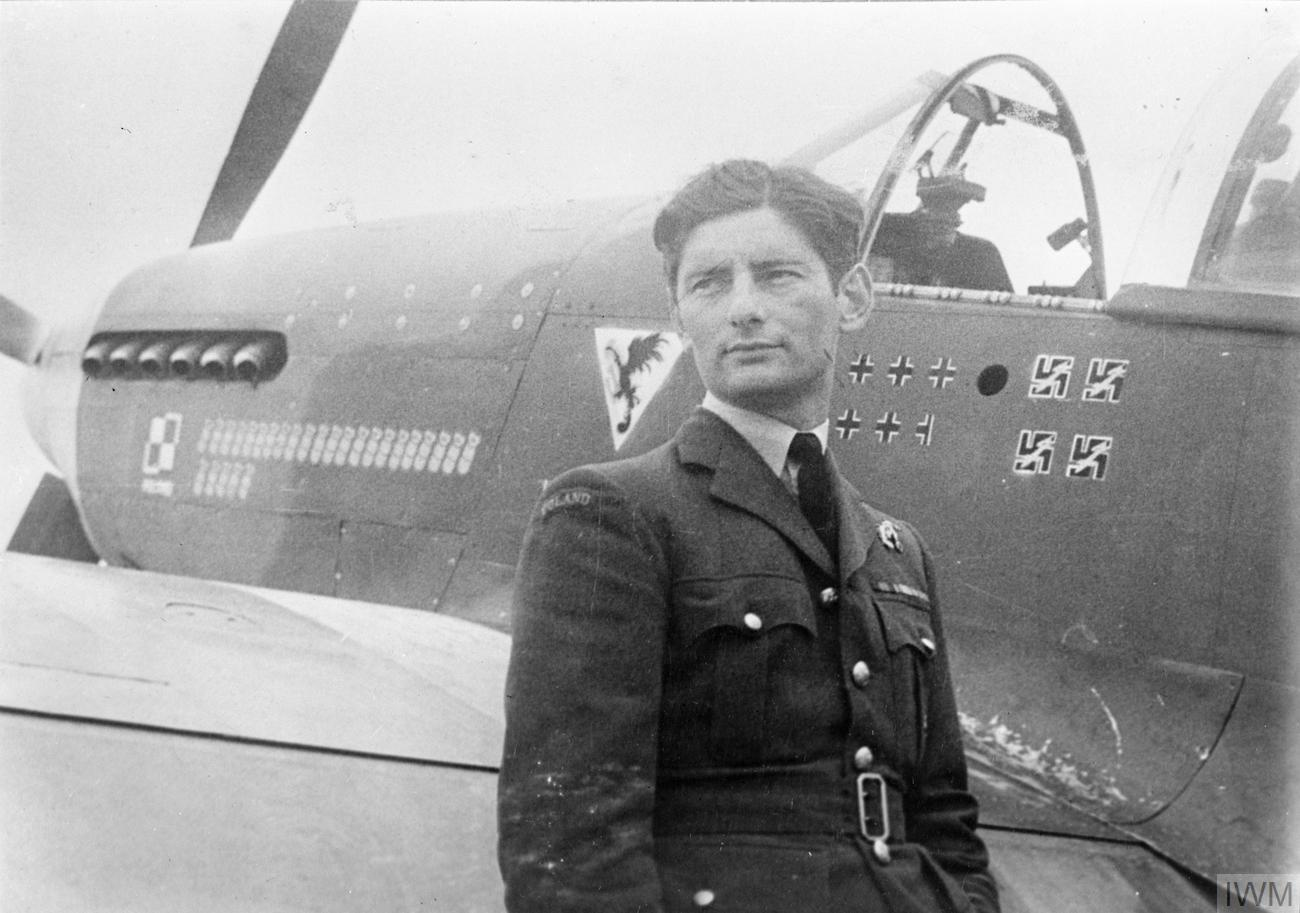
Squadron Leader Eugeniusz Horbaczewski, the CO of No. 315 Polish Fighter Squadron, standing by his new North American Mustang Mark III, at RAF Brenzett, Kent. He was shot down and killed on 18 August 1944, after destroying three Focke-Wulf Fw 190s to bring his score to 16 and a half victories.

- Coastal Command
  - No 19 (GR) Group
    - No. 304 Polish Bomber Squadron "Silesia" RAF Chivenor (Vickers Wellington Mk. XIV)
- Polish Fighting Team
  - Polski Zespół Myśliwski (Polish Fighting Team) (also known as Skalski's Circus) (Supermarine Spitfire F VB Trop and VC, later Supermarine Spitfire F IXC)

Bases

- RAF West Kirby (England) – First base
- In African area
  - Bu Grara
  - La Fauconnerie
  - Goubrine
  - Hergla
  - Ben Gardane

== Statistics ==
Deployments
		1940	1941	1942	1943	1944	1945	total
Fighters (Note: Including all Polish air units in France, as well as Polish fighter units of RAF Fighter Command; excluding the pilots of the Polish Fighting Team, as well as Polish pilots fighting in the RAF and USAAF)	sorties	4,115	13,032	10,390	13,266	25,399	9,238	73,524
Fighters	hours	4,533	16,722	15,365	23,264	46,595	18,575	122,816
Bombers (Note: Including the Polish units of Bomber Command, Coastal Command and Tactical Air Force, but excluding the special units of No. 138 Squadron RAF, No. 1586 (Polish Special Duties) Flight and No. 301 Polish Bomber Squadron)	sorties	97	1,357	2,999	1,895	3,607	1,751	11,706
Bombers	hours	368	7,451	17,788	11,482.5	18,126	8,889	64,113
Special (Note: No. 138 Squadron RAF, No. 1586 (Polish Special Duties) Flight and No. 301 Polish Bomber Squadron)	sorties	–	2	104	191	943	95	1,335
Special	hours	–	22	835	1,573	6,781	716	9,927
Transport (Note: Including Polish units of the Transport Command and Air Transport Auxiliary)	sorties	163	1,475	2,648	3,995	6,747	3,760	18,788
Transport	hours	261	14,868	16,914	20,111	30,204	14,709	97,067

Claims
	1940	1941	1942	1943	1944	1945	total
destroyed	266 1/6	202	90	114 3/4	103	38 1/2	769 5/12
probable	38	52	36	42	10	2	177
damaged	43 2/3 + 3/5	60 1/2	43	66	27	18	252 1/6

== See also ==
- Air Force of the Polish Army (in the East)
- Polish Air Force (modern)
- Polish contribution to World War II
