= No. 1586 (Polish Special Duties) Flight =

No. 1586 Flight RAF
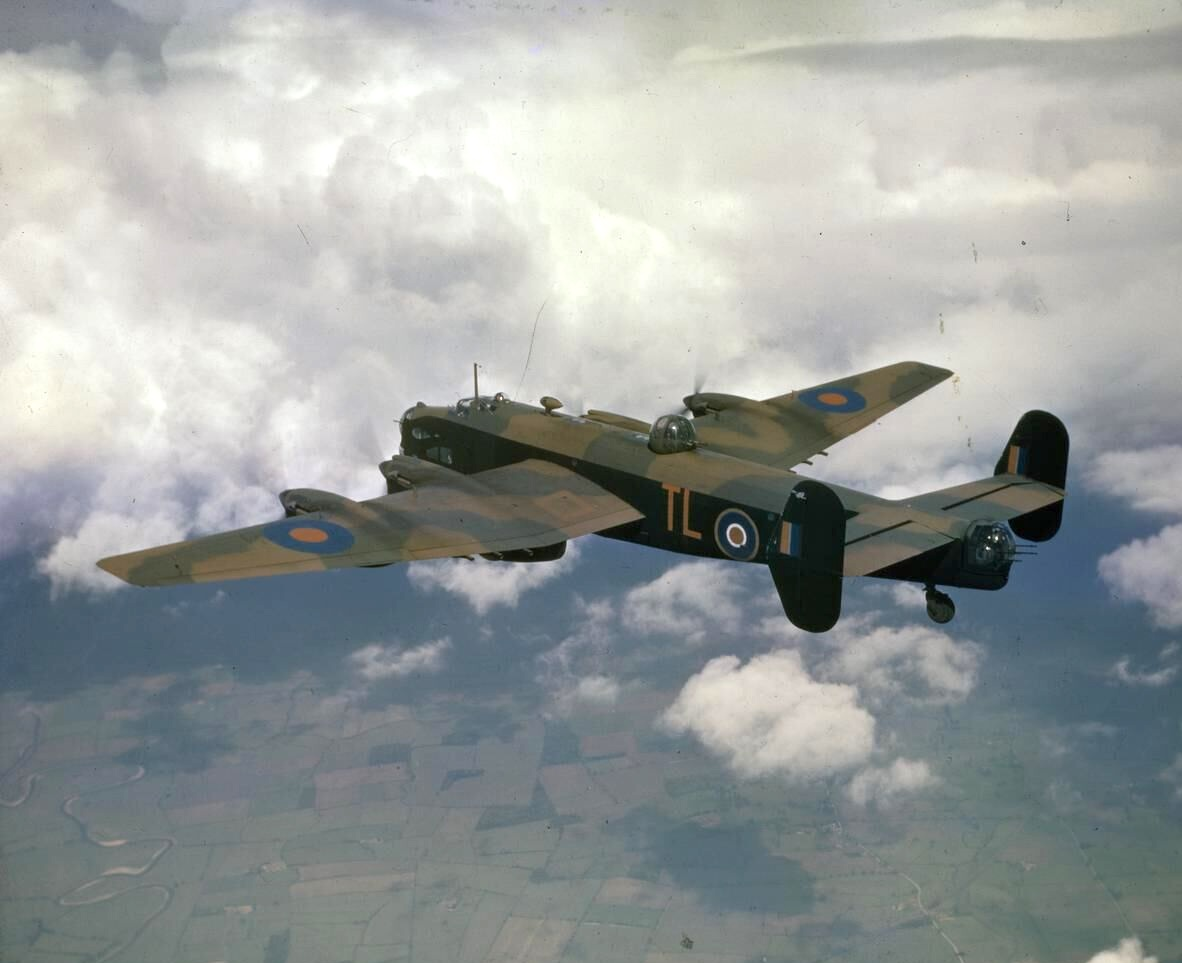
- A Halifax similar to those flown by 1586 Flt.
- Active: 4 November 1943 – 7 November 1944
- Allegiance: (Poland) Polish Government in exile
- Role: Special Duties
- Garrison/HQ: RAF Derna; RAF Brindisi
- Equipment: Handley Page Halifax II; Consolidated Liberator III; Consolidated Liberator IV HAR.10; Hawker Hurricane IID

Insignia
- Identification symbol: GR

No. 1586 (Polish Special Duties) Flight was first formed at RAF Derna, in Libya on 4 November 1943, equipped with Handley Page Halifax II configured as transports for special operation missions.

The origin of 1586 flight was the remnants of 301 (Polish) Squadron after disbandment on 31 March 1943 by the Polish HQ due to lack of staff and trained crews. Volunteer crews and aircraft formed C Flight of 138 Squadron, on 1 April 1943. Temporarily renamed as 301 Squadron Special Duties Flight RAF it had seven crews and operated three Handley Page Halifax and three Consolidated Liberator special transport bombers.

On 4 November 1943, Flight became No. 1586 (Polish Special Duties) Flight at RAF Derna Libya. It was still named locally by their ex 301 crews and Polish authorities as No. 301 Squadron Land of Pomerania. On 22 December 1943, the Polish flight was transferred to Campo Cassale near Brindisi, Italy, from where it flew above the occupied Europe with special duties. Missions flown by the flight included partisan supply drops and agent insertion.

A special effort was undertaken to supply Polish insurgents after an outbreak of Warsaw Uprising in August 1944. Flights to central Poland were especially difficult, lasting up to eleven hours. A memorial to a crashed Halifax of the squadron is located in Szentes, Hungary. The machine was flying in support of the supply effort. Both pilots, Lewandowski and Szejnowski, were killed. The tail gunner was known to have survived. The flight was reorganized on 7 November 1944 at RAF Brindisi Italy and reformed as the No. 301 Polish Bomber Squadron.
