= Magna Park, Lutterworth =

Warehousing and logistics center

Coordinates: 52°27′40″N 01°14′45″W

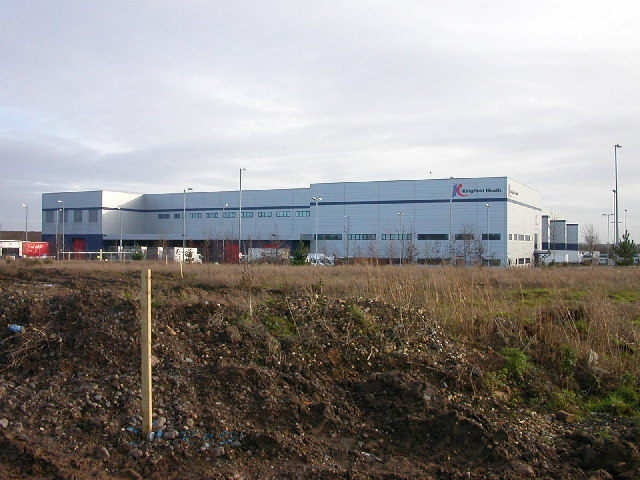
Magna Park

Magna Park is a 500 acres (2.0 km^{2}) road warehousing and logistic centre (distribution centre) located near Lutterworth, Leicestershire, England. The population of the site is listed in the civil ward of Bitteswell.

== History and description ==
Magna Park was created by a collaboration between the Church of England and Asda in 1988; constructed on the site of a former airfield (RAF Bitteswell) it is considered a pioneer of large distribution centres in the UK. It is located in an area of land bounded by the M1, M6 and M69 motorways; known as the 'Golden Triangle' for its logistically favourable location.

In 2005 a major fire at UK clothing retailer Primark's warehouse at the site destroyed much of the company's stock.

In 2007 tenants included Asda, Britvic, Honda, Toyota, BT, Argos, LIDL, Merck Eurolab, TNT and Panasonic. In 2008 it was the largest distribution centre in Europe.

== See also ==
- Magna Park, Milton Keynes
- Daventry International Rail Freight Terminal
