= RAF Derna =

Former Royal Air Force station in Derna, Libya

RAF Derna
- Derna, Derna District in Libya

Site information
- Owner: Air Ministry
- Operator: Royal Air Force

Site history
- Built: 1941
- In use: 1941 - 1943

Airfield information
Runways
Direction	Length and surface
00/00

Royal Air Force Derna or more simply RAF Derna is a former Royal Air Force station located near Derna, Libya.

== History ==
On 4 November 1943 No. 1586 Flight RAF was formed at RAF Derna.

The following squadrons were also here at some point:

- No. 6 Squadron RAF between 5 and 8 April 1941 with the Hawker Hurricane
- No. 45 Squadron RAF between 4 and 6 April 1941 with the Bristol Blenheim IV
- No. 55 Squadron RAF between 4 and 7 April 1941 with the Bristol Blenheim IV
- No. 80 Squadron RAF between 7 September and 19 October 1943 with the Supermarine Spitfire VC & IX
- No. 148 Squadron RAF between 5 April and 1 September 1943 with the Consolidated Liberator I and Handley Page Halifax II
- Detachment of No. 223 Squadron RAF between September 1942 and March 1943 with the Martin Baltimore III
- No. 227 Squadron RAF between 5 May and 24 June 1943 then again between 19 July and 16 August 1943 with the Bristol Beaufighter VIC
- No. 274 Squadron RAF between 9 August and 7 October 1943 with the Supermarine Spitfire VB & VC
- Detachment of No. 294 Squadron RAF between September 1943 and March 1944 with the Vickers Wellington IC & Supermarine Walrus
- Detachment of No. 680 Squadron RAF between February and August 1943 with the Supermarine Spitfire IX

== See also ==
- Martuba Airbase nearby
