= Teofil Adamecki =

Polish lawyer and activist

- Born: 1886; Marklowice, Austria (nowadays Zaolzie)
- Died: 1969 (aged 82–83); Bielsko-Biała
- Occupations: Lawyer; activist
- Children: 2

Teofil Adamecki (1886 in Bielsko-Biała – 1969) was a Polish lawyer and activist.

He graduated in law at Vienna University. Adamecki was a member of Rada Narodowa Księstwa Cieszyńskiego (National Council of the Duchy of Cieszyn), a local Polish self-government council set to temporarily manage the area before the decision concerning the future of Cieszyn Silesia. Later he became director the Chamber of Commerce and Industry and Chamber of Izba Welny in Bielsko. From 1933 to 1939 Adamecki was president of the Bielsko branch of the Polish Tourist Association.

After World War II he was one of the founders and first president of the Towarzystwo Miłośników Ziemi Bielsko-Bialskiej (Association of Friends of Bielsko-Biała Land).
