= No. 300 Polish Bomber Squadron =

Polish World War II bomber squadron

No. 300 (Masovian) Squadron RAF
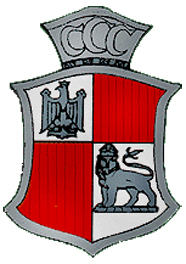
- Badge of no. 300 (Masovian) squadron RAF
- Active: 1 July 1940 – January 1947
- Country: United Kingdom
- Allegiance: (Poland) Polish government-in-exile
- Branch: Royal Air Force
- Role: Bomber
- Part of: RAF Bomber Command
- Nickname: Masovian; Mazowiecki
- Aircraft: Fairey Battle; Vickers Wellington; Avro Lancaster
- Battle honours: Millennium Offensive, bombing raids on V-weapons sites, D-Day, crossing the Rhine, Battle of the Ruhr, bombing of Hamburg and Battle of Berlin.

Commanders
- Notable commanders: Squadron Leader Bronisław Szota

Insignia
- Squadron code: BH (July 1940 – October 1946)

No. 300 (Polish) Bomber Squadron "Land of Masovia" (Polish: 300 Dywizjon Bombowy "Ziemi Mazowieckiej"; also "No 300 (Masovian) Squadron") was a Polish bomber squadron formed in Great Britain as part of an agreement between the Polish government-in-exile and the United Kingdom in 1940. It was one of 15 squadrons of the Polish Air Force in exile that served alongside the Royal Air Force in World War II. It was disbanded in 1947. 300 Squadron is now represented by 300 (Isle of Axholme) Squadron of the Royal Air Force Air Training Corps, which made the alliance with the Polish Air Force in 1994.

== History ==
Before the outbreak of World War II, the Polish government signed an agreement with the Royal Air Force. According to the appendix to the Polish-British Alliance, in the event of war with Germany, two Polish bomber squadrons were to be created on British soil. However, after Germany and the USSR invaded Poland, most of the Polish airmen who reached the West were incorporated into the Polish Air Forces being created in France. It was not until the fall of France that Polish airmen started to arrive in the United Kingdom in large numbers.

Polish evacuees and refugees with experience in aerial warfare were at first housed in a military camp in Eastchurch.

No. 300 Polish Bomber Squadron was created On 1 July 1940 as the first such Polish unit at RAF Bramcote, as a part of the Polish Air Forces in Great Britain. As there was a large number of Polish airmen, often with experience in combat against German forces in Poland and France, further bomber squadrons were created by 24 July.

Between 19 July 1940 and 8 May 1945, the crews of 300 squadron flew 3,891 sorties and spent 20,264 hours in the air.

At first equipped with Fairey Battle light bombers, the squadron was re-equipped with Vickers Wellington medium bombers on 16 November 1940. The squadron used several variants, including Mark IC, IV, III and X. In 1941 while the unit was equipped with Wellingtons and flying from Hemswell on "gardening" (mining) operations, the squadron's Intelligence Officer was Michael Bentine, later to become well-known as an entertainer. On 5 March 1944 the unit was re-equipped with Avro Lancaster heavy bombers. It was the only Polish squadron that operated Lancasters, and it continued to use them until the end of World War II (Mk I and Mk III variants).

During the war the squadron took part in most of the notable air offensives in Europe, including attacks on the Germany Kriegsmarine preparing for Operation Sea Lion, also ships such as the German battleship Gneisenau docked in Brest, France, other naval facilities in Wilhelmshaven and its U-boat facilities in Saint-Nazaire, Millennium Offensive on large bombing raids on Cologne, bombing raids on V-weapons sites, D-Day, in support of crossing the Rhine, the Battle of the Ruhr, the bombing of Hamburg, and the Battle of Berlin.

A number of the crew members were in late 1942 attached to the RAF Tempsford based No. 138 (Special) Squadron RAF as the newly formed Flight C operating the Handley Page Halifax.

The last mission was the bombing of Obersalzberg on 25 April 1945 against Adolf Hitler's residence in Berchtesgaden. The unit was disbanded in January 1947, after the Allies withdrew their support for the Polish government-in-exile.

== Details ==
Commanding officers of 300 squadron
From	Commanding officer	Notes
1 July 1940	Lt.Col. engineer pilot Wacław Makowski	with W/Cdr K. P. Lewis as a British supervisor
18 July 1941	Mjr pilot Stanisław Cwynar	
27 January 1942	Mjr pilot Romuald Suliński	
1 August 1942	Mjr pilot Władysław Dukszto	Since 9 July a co-commander
31 October 1942	Mjr pilot Adam Kropiński	
4 May 1943	Mjr pilot Mieczysław Kucharski	
18 November 1943	Mjr pilot Kazimierz Kuzian	
18 January 1944	Mjr pilot Adam Kowalczyk	
1 April 1944	Mjr pilot Teofil Pożyczka	
2 February 1945	Mjr pilot Bolesław Jarkowski	
17 September 1945	Mjr pilot Romuald Suliński	
22 February 1946	Mjr pilot Bolesław Jarkowski	Until the dissolution of the unit in January 1947

Bases from which 300 Squadron operated
From	To	Base
1 July 1940		RAF Bramcote
22 August 1940		RAF Swinderby
18 July 1941		RAF Hemswell
18 May 1942		RAF Ingham
31 January 1943		RAF Hemswell
22 June 1943		RAF Ingham
1 March 1944		RAF Faldingworth

== See also ==
- Polish Air Forces in France and Great Britain
- Military history of Poland during World War II
- List of Royal Air Force aircraft squadrons

== Bibliography ==
- Lewis, Peter (1968) [1959]. Squadron Histories, RFC, RNAS and RAF, Since 1912. London: Putnam. SBN 370-00022-6.
