= Chłapowo, Pomeranian Voivodeship =

Chłapowo
- Village
- Location within Poland
- Coordinates: 54°48′15″N 18°22′13″E
- Country: Poland
- Voivodeship: Pomeranian
- County: Puck
- Gmina: Władysławowo
- Population: 1,264
- Time zone: UTC+1 (CET)
  - Summer (DST): UTC+2 (CEST)
- Vehicle registration: GPU

Chłapowo (German: Chlapau, 1942-45 Klappau) is a seaside resort and village in the administrative district of Gmina Władysławowo, within Puck County, Pomeranian Voivodeship, in northern Poland. It is located in the ethnocultural region of Kashubia in the historic region of Pomerania on the coast of the Baltic Sea.

== History ==
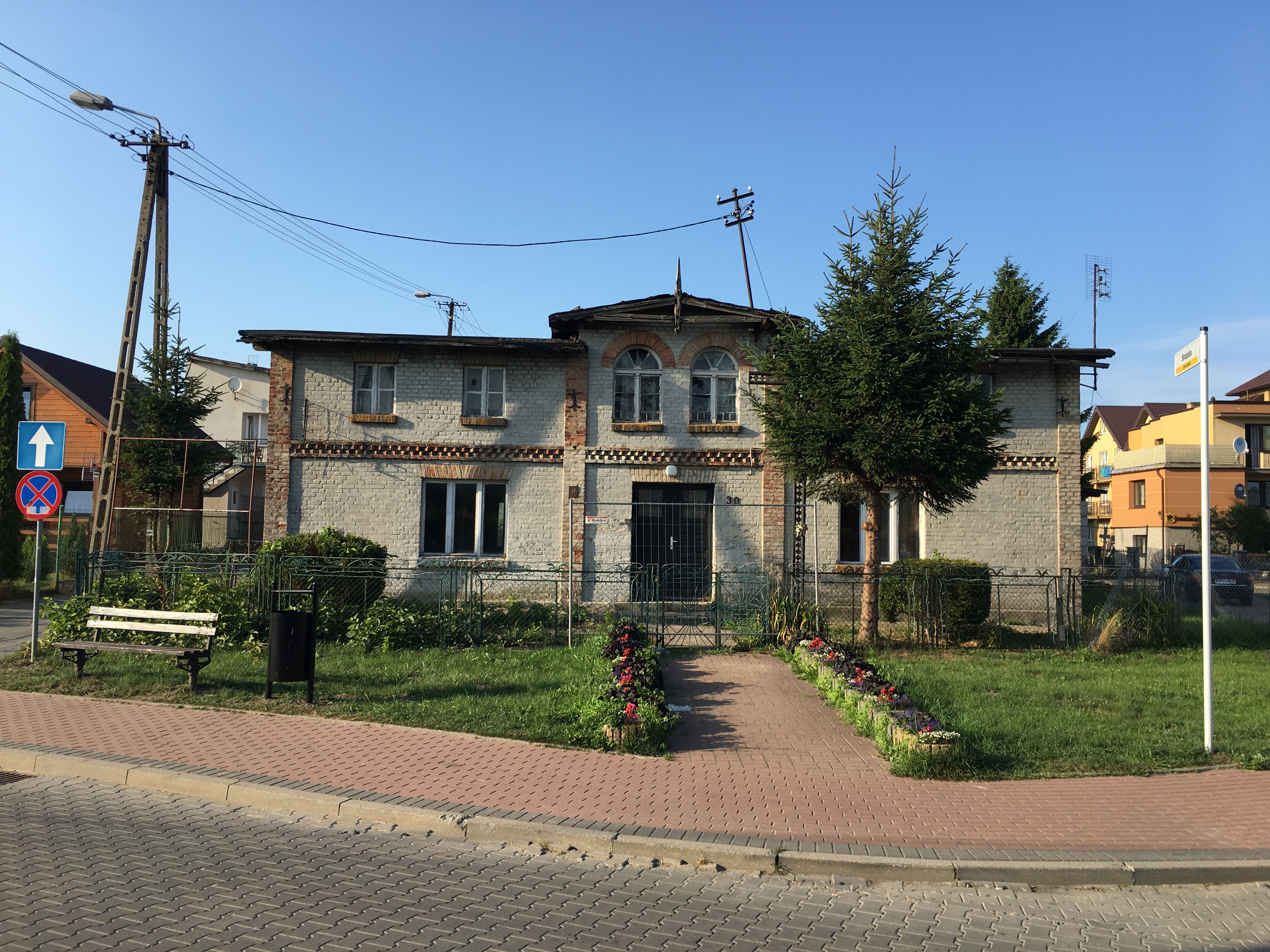
Typical historic architecture of Chłapowo

The first mention of Chłapowo comes from 1359, the name of the village was then written in German as Klappow. Chłapowo was a royal village of the Polish Crown, administratively located in the Puck County in the Pomeranian Voivodeship. The name Chłapowo was finally established in the mid-17th century. In 1877–1949, 124 box graves of the East Pomeranian culture from the Iron Age (650-400 BC) were discovered and examined in Chłapowo. Archaeologists found well-preserved amber ornaments, ashtrays, glass beads, earthenware, and jewelry. The subsequent archaeological research conducted in the vicinity of the village in the 20th century led to the discovery of traces of settlement from the Neolithic period (4200–1700 BCE) and the Bronze Age (2000–1000 BCE).

The development of Chłapowo began at the end of the 18th century. Rural cottages with thatched roofs and a historic brick chapel have survived to this day. In the mid-nineteenth century, a small lignite mine was operating here. In the late 19th century, the village had a population of 278, incl. 270 Catholics and 8 Protestants, mostly employed in fishing. The proximity of the Baltic Sea and the scenery of the Chłapowo Ravine made Chłapowo a summer resort in the interwar period. Summer vacationers (mainly from Warsaw) rented rooms from the peasants who lived in the village. Later, as a result of competition with other resorts (Władysławowo, Jastrzębia Góra, Karwia, Hel Peninsula), Chłapowo lost its importance, preserving the atmosphere of a fishing village. In the vicinity of the village, there are documented deposits of rock salt and potassium-magnesium salt.

Kashubian writer Augustyn Necel, was born, lived and worked in Chłapowo, creating such works as: Bloody Storm, Kutra with Red Sails, Saga o Swedish Chëczy and Maszopi.

During the German occupation of Poland (World War II), in 1942, several Polish families were expelled by the SS and German police, and enslaved as forced labour in the county.

From 1973 to 2014 Chłapowo was a part of the town of Władysławowo.

== Tourism ==
In Chłapowo at al. Żemorskiego, two summer seaside resorts were organized.

Along the northern border of Chłapowo there is a sandy beach with a cliff. The main bathing area is situated on the sandy beach.

Chłapowo's attraction is the Chłapowski Gorge, called by the Kashubs Rudnik. It was created as a result of the erosion by waters flowing from Wysoczyzna to the Baltic Sea. The shore of a high and steep cliff is constantly washed away by sea waves.

The seaside part of Chłapowo includes the Seaside Landscape Park. This area, remaining beyond human interference, constitutes a fully natural environment. The species found here include common broom (Cytisus scoparius).

== Gallery ==
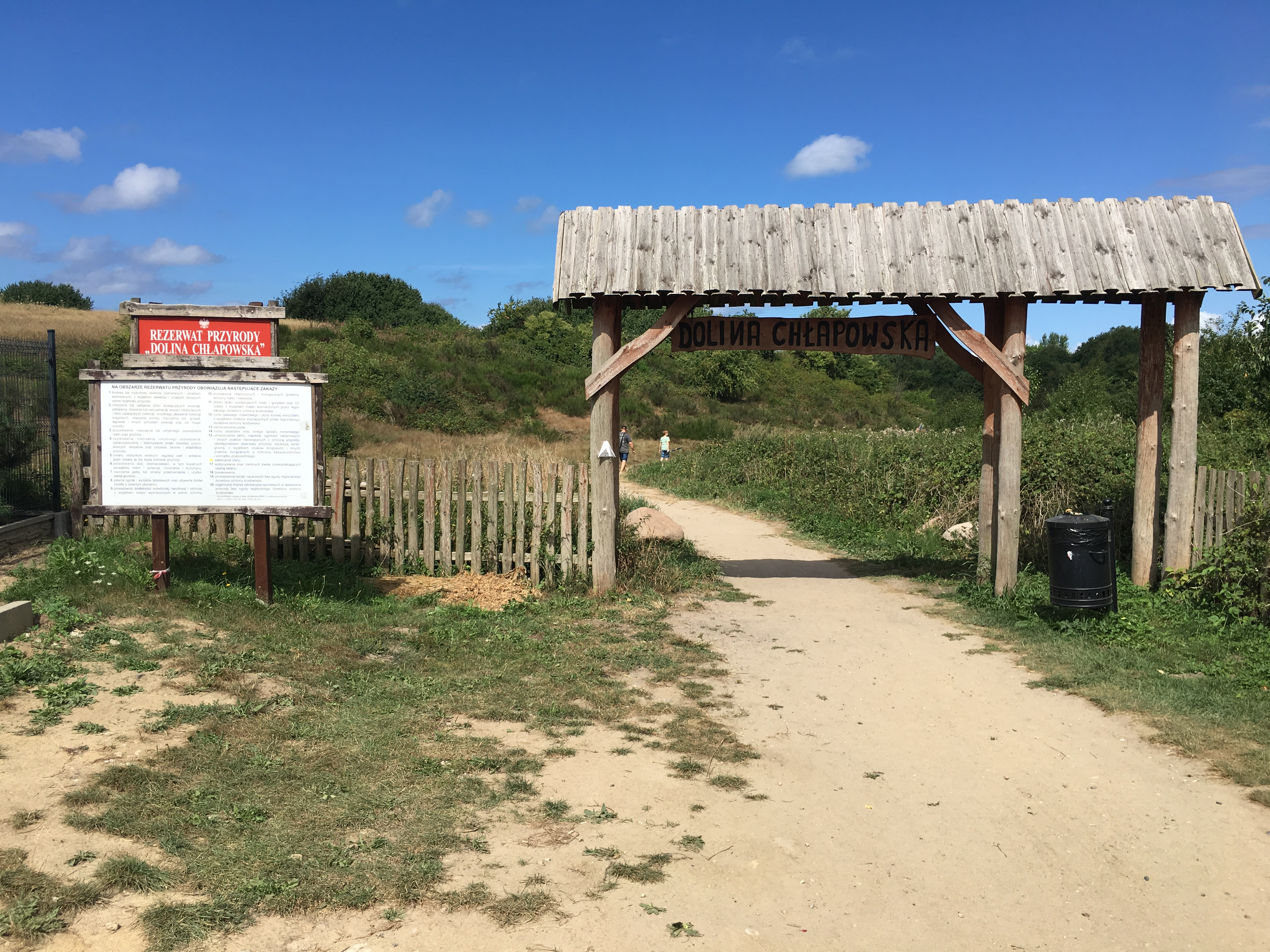
Entrance to the Chłapowo gorge

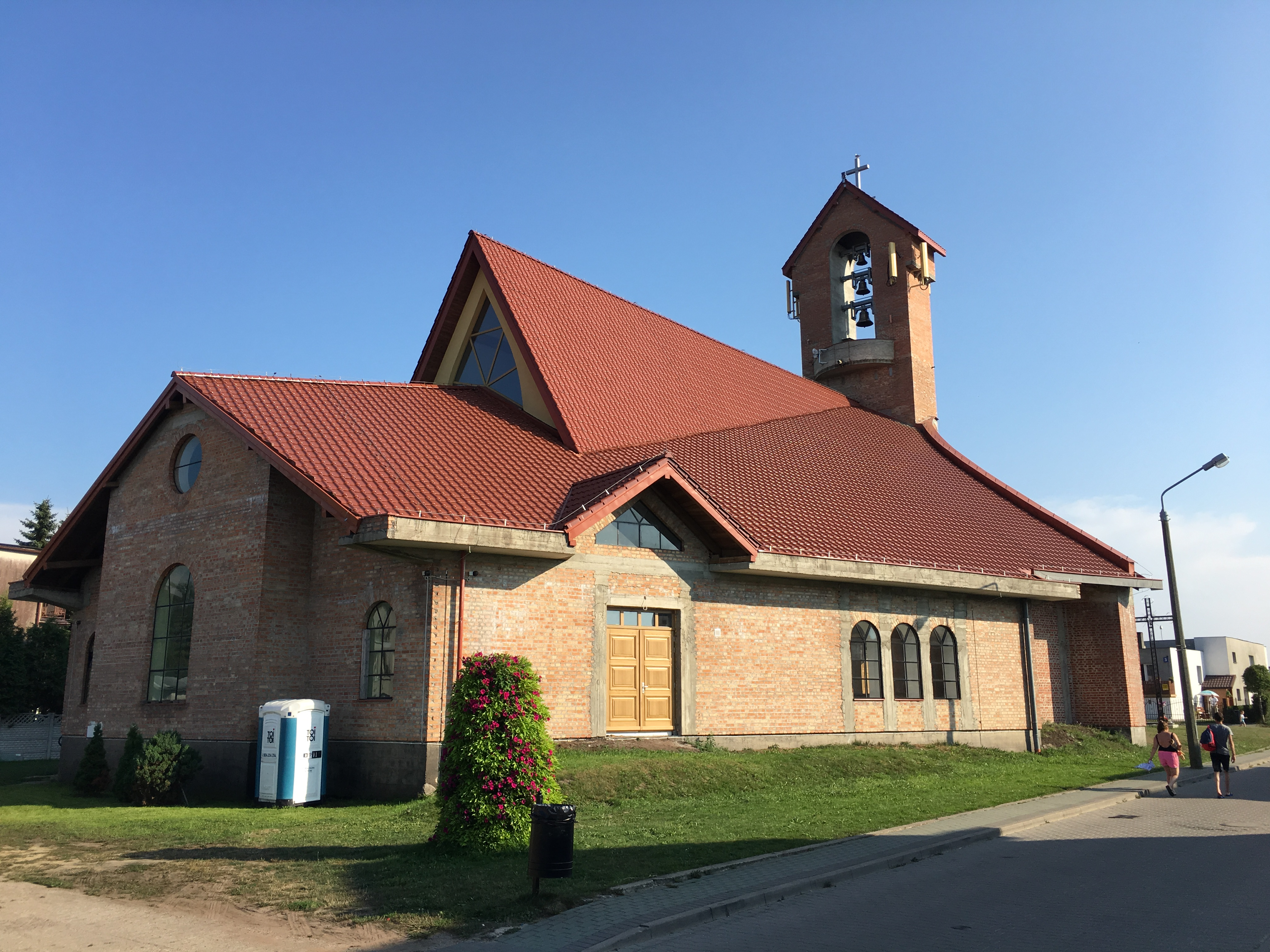
Divine Mercy church

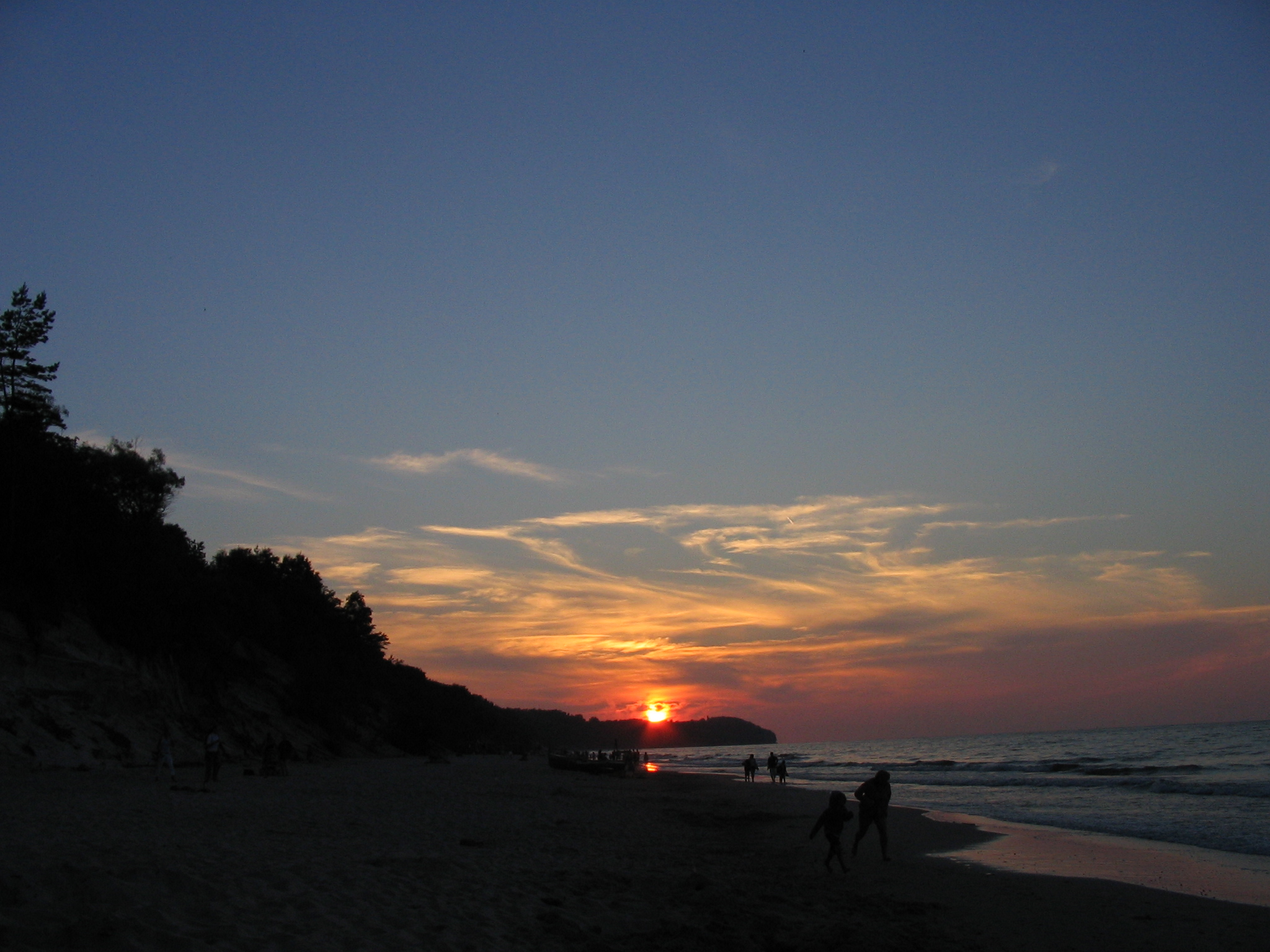
Chłapowo beach during sunset
