= Jan Kiedrowicz =

Polish chess player (1960–2024)

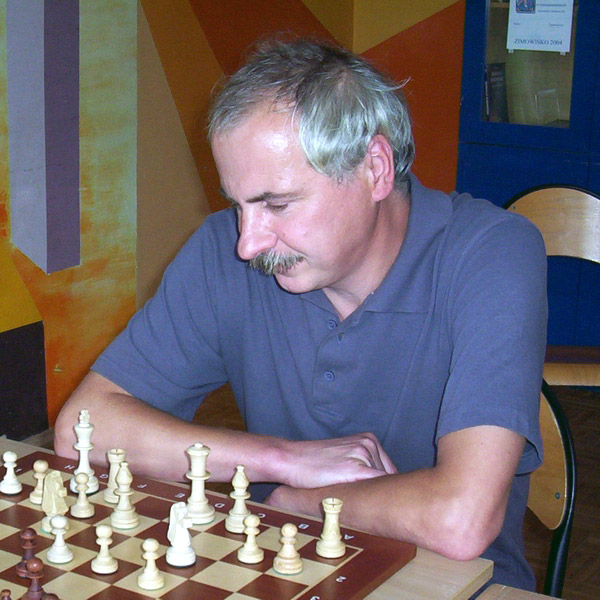
- Kiedrowicz in 2007

Personal information
- Born: 11 March 1960 Chojnice, Poland
- Died: 11 November 2024 (aged 64)

Chess career
- Country: Poland
- Title: International Master (1987)
- Peak rating: 2425 (July 1984)

Jan Kiedrowicz (11 March 1960 – 11 November 2024) was a Polish chess International Master (1987).

== Chess career ==
In 1982, Jan Kiedrowicz took 2nd place at the tournament held in Gdańsk. In 1983, he appeared in the final of Polish Chess Championship, played in Piotrków Trybunalski (taking 15th place). In the same year, he took 2nd place in Lesko and twice shared 3rd places at international chess tournaments in Białystok and Sopot. In 1990, in Gdynia Jan Kiedrowicz won silver medal in Polish Blitz Chess Championship. In 1992, he won a bronze medal in Legnica in Polish Team Blitz Championship, and in 1994 in Lubniewice - a bronze medal in Polish Team Chess Championship (both in the colors of the chess club Górnik Zabrze). In 1996, Jan Kiedrowicz shared the 1st place (together with Jurij Zezulkin) in the Emanuel Lasker memorial in Barlinek. In 1999, he won the title of chess champion of Gdańsk, and in 2004 he was very successful, winning in Rowy the title of the Polish Chess Champion for the Disabled Persons (he was also twice won silver medals in Poland Chess Championships for the Disabled Persons: 1998 and 2005). In 2010, he won the international chess tournament in Chojnice, and in 2014 - in Jastrzębia Góra. In 2015, in Jastrzębia Góra, he took 2nd place (behind Marcin Krzyżanowski).

Kiedrowicz reached his career highest rating on 1 July 1984, with a score of 2425 points, and was then 6th - 8th place among Polish chess players.

== Death ==
Kiedrowicz died on 11 November 2024, at the age of 64.
