= Józef Jeka =

Polish fighter pilot

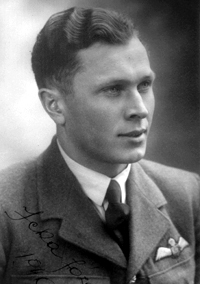
- Born: 6 April 1917; Tupadły, German Empire (present-day Poland)
- Died: 13 April 1958 (aged 41); Manado, North Sulawesi, Indonesia
- Military career
- Allegiance: Poland; United Kingdom
- Branch: Polish Air Force; Royal Air Force
- Service years: 1937–1958
- Rank: squadron leader
- Service number: P-1654
- Units: Polish 141st Fighter Escadrille; No. 238 Squadron RAF; No. 306 Polish Fighter Squadron; No. 308 Polish Fighter Squadron; No. 316 Polish Fighter Squadron
- Commands: No. 306 Polish Fighter Squadron
- Conflicts: Polish Defensive War, World War II
- Awards: Virtuti Militari; Cross of Valour; Cross of Merit with Swords (Poland); Distinguished Flying Medal; 1939–1945 Star; France and Germany Star; Defence Medal (United Kingdom); War Medal 1939–1945; Air Force Medal for War 1939–45 (Poland)

Józef Jeka (1917–1958) was a Polish fighter pilot who served in the Polish Defensive War and became an ace in the Battle of Britain. In the Second World War he shot down at least eight enemy aircraft, and survived being shot down twice.

In the Cold War Jeka worked for the CIA. He was killed in 1958 in an air crash on a covert mission in Indonesia.

== Biography ==
=== Early years ===
Józef Jeka was born in Tupadły (present-day it is part of the town Władysławowo). He was the son of Antoni and Agata Mudlaff. Józef's father was a Polish independence activist. Two Józef's brothers, Alfons and Stanisław belonged to the Pomeranian Griffin.

On 1 August 1937 Józef Jeka entered the Non-Commissioned Officer's School for minors. Then he participated in a course in aircraft maintenance. After completing his flying training and then a fighter pilot course, he was assigned to Polish 141st Fighter Escadrille.

=== World War II ===
During the September Campaign Jeka flew a PZL P.11 fighter. After the Soviet invasion of Poland he crossed the border with Romania, where he was interned. He escaped to France via Yugoslavia and Greece, on 23 October he arrived in Marseille.

On 23 February 1940 he came to England. After training in Blackpool and Carlisle Jeka was sent to No. 238 Squadron RAF. He shot down his first plane on 15 September 1940. He became an ace with his fifth victory on 7 October when he shot down a Junkers Ju 88. On 5 October Jeka was shot down; wounded, he was hospitalized till 15 November in Shaftesbury. From 15 November 1940 to 15 December 1941 he flew in No. 306 Polish Fighter Squadron and destroyed two Bf 109s. From December 1941 to March 1942 Jeka was an instructor in No. 58 Operational Training Unit based at RAF Grangemouth. He returned to his squadron on 25 May 1942.

On 9 December 1942 he entered officers' school. He was promoted to porucznik (lieutenant) and posted to No. 308 Polish Fighter Squadron. He later served in No. 316 Polish Fighter Squadron. On 21 May 1944 Jeka was shot down by flak over France. He parachuted to safety and hid with the help of the French Resistance. Two months later, the Allied front reached his hiding place and Jeka returned to his unit. On 25 May 1945 he was appointed commander of 306 squadron.

On 31 December 1949 Jeka ended his service in the Polish Air Force.

=== Cold War ===
After the Second World War ended, Jeka stayed in the RAF and served in Allied-occupied Germany. He married a British woman, and had a daughter whom he never met. In Germany he was invited to work for the CIA. Jeka accepted as an avowed anti-communist. From 1950 he collaborated with British and American intelligence. He flight-tested the Lockheed U-2 aircraft, and flew missions over Central and Eastern Europe. He was considered as a candidate to steal a Soviet MiG-15, but the mission was cancelled as on 5 March 1953 the Polish pilot Franciszek Jarecki landed his MiG at Bornholm.

In the late 1950s Jeka served in the Angkatan Udara Revolusioner (AUREV) air force of the Permesta rebels on Sulawesi in Indonesia. AUREV was covertly equipped and manned by the CIA. On 13 April 1958, Jeka was the pilot of an AUREV Martin B-26 Marauder when it crashed on take-off from Permesta's Mapanget airbase. Jeka, his Polish navigator Jan Iżicky, and his Indonesian radio operator / observer, Minahasan, were killed.

Jeka is buried in Newark-on-Trent, Nottinghamshire, England. His grave is next to the Polish section of the CWGC cemetery.

== Awards ==
Virtuti Militari, Silver Cross
Cross of Valour (Poland), four times
Cross of Merit with Swords (Poland)
Distinguished Flying Medal
1939–1945 Star
France and Germany Star
Defence Medal (United Kingdom)
War Medal 1939–1945
Air Force Medal for War 1939–45 (Poland)

== Military promotions ==
=== Polish Air Force ===
- szeregowy – 1 August 1937
- starszy szeregowy – 1 April 1938
- kapral – 30 June 1939
- plutonowy – 15 October 1941
- podporucznik – 1 November 1941
- porucznik – 1 March 1943
- kapitan – 1 January 1946
- major - 15 August 1947

=== Royal Air Force ===
- Sergeant – 15 August 1940
- Pilot officer – 1 November 1941
- Flying officer – 1 October 1942
- Flight lieutenant – 1 November 1943
- Squadron leader – 25 May 1945
