= Stanisław Kostyra =

Polish chess player

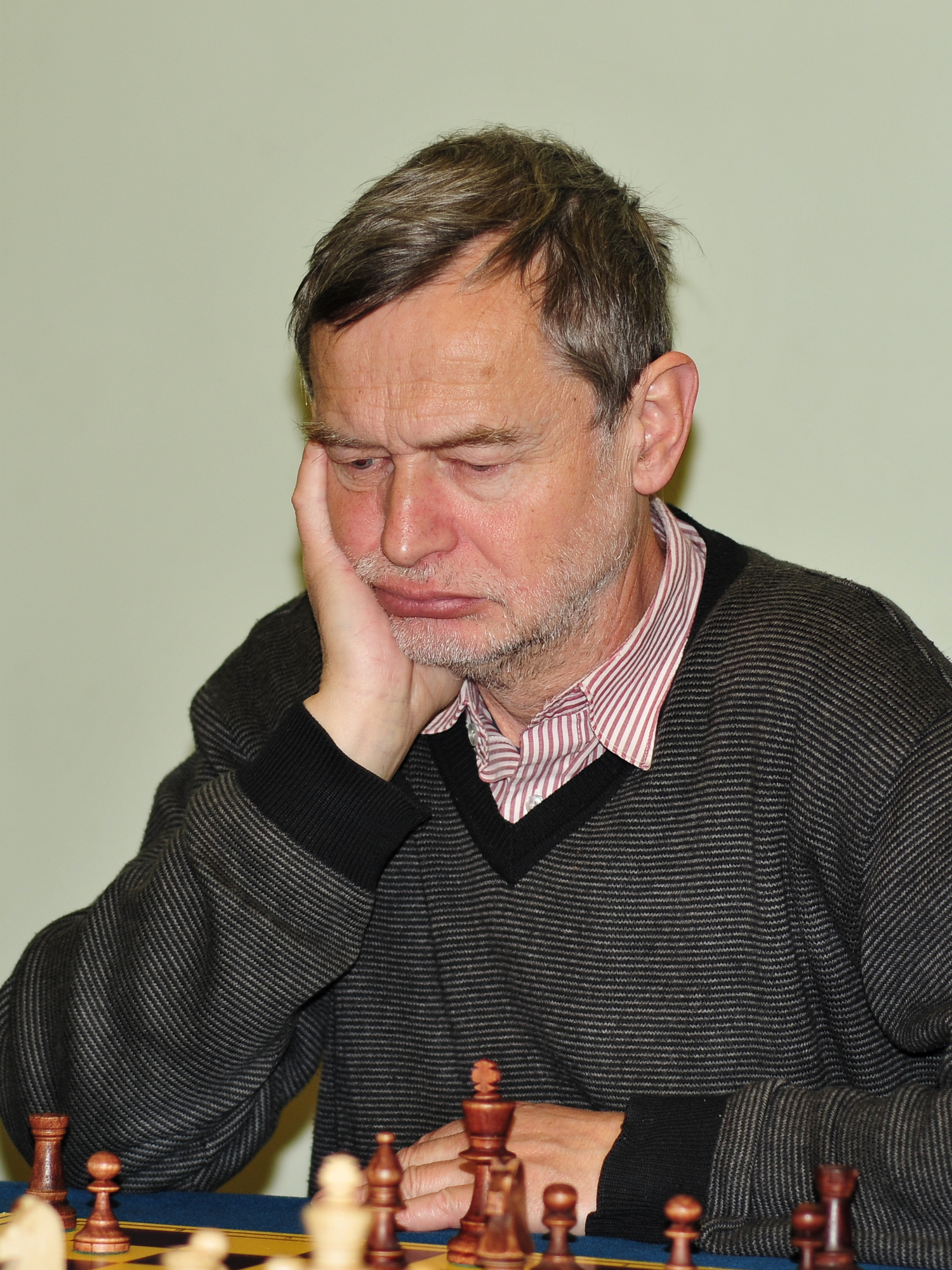
- Stanisław Kostyra in 2013

Personal information
- Born: 26 January 1951 (age 75) Dębica, Poland

Chess career
- Country: Poland
- Title: International Master (1987)
- Peak rating: 2400 (January 1986)

Stanisław Kostyra (born 26 January 1951) is a Polish chess International Master (1987).

== Chess career ==
Stanisław Kostyra appeared in the finals of Polish Chess Championship twice (1975, 1977). In the Polish Team Chess Championships he won two bronze medals (in 1984 in Jaszowiec, with the Górnik 09 Mysłowice team and in 1997 in Krynica-Zdrój, with the team Rymer Rybnik). Stanisław Kostyra has two medals in Polish Blitz Chess Championship, which he won in 1981 (bronze, in Bydgoszcz) and 1989 (gold, in Miętne). He also won seven medals Polish Team Blitz Chess Championships: two gold (in 1980 in Kalisz, with the team Górnik 09 Mysłowice and in 1997 in Poznań, with the team Rymer Rybnik) and five silver medals (in 1982 in Katowice, in 1983 in Warsaw and in 1984 in Bydgoszcz – all with the team Górnik 09 Mysłowice, in 1990 in Gdynia, with the team Igloopol Dębica and in 1996 in Łuków, with the team Rymer Rybnik).

Stanisław Kostyra has participated in international and national chess tournaments many times, achieving successes, e.g. in Świnoujście (1977 – open, shared 3rd place), Kraków (1975, 1977 and 1978 – 1st place), Jelenia Góra (1978 – 3rd place), Plzeň (1979 – open – 1st place), Wieżyca (1980 – open, shared 2nd place), Nałęczów (1980 – open – shared 1st place), Piekary Śląskie (1980 – open – shared 1st place), Plzeň (1981 – 1st place; 1982 – 3rd place and shared 1st place ( open, together with Zbigniew Księski)), Mysłowice (1982 – open – 1st place), Třinec (1983 – shared 2nd place), Poznań (1983 – open – 1st place), Białystok (1984 – 1st place), Brno (1984 – shared 1st place), Mezőhegyes (1984 – shared 1st place, together among others with Vladimir Okhotnik and Andrzej Maciejewski), Łódź (1985 – 1st place), Jastrzębia Góra (1985 – shared 1st place, together among others with Jan Kiedrowicz), Szyce (1985 – 1st place), Gorzów Wielkopolski (1985 – 2nd place), Leszczyny (1985 – 1st place, here he fulfilled the first norm for the title of International Master), Czadca (1986 – shared 1st place), Jaworzno (1986 – open- 1st place), Białystok (1986 – open – 1st place), Rzeszów (1986 – 1st place, filled in here second norm for the title of international master), Wisła (1986, shared 2nd place), Piła (1987 – 2nd place), Rostock (1988 – shared 1st place, together with Sergey Kalinitschew], Międzyzdroje (1991 – open- 1st place), Radom (1991 – 2nd place), Ustrzyki Dolne (1992 – open – shared 2nd place), Rudnik nad Sanem (1992 – shared 1st place), (Białystok (1996 – open – shared 1st place, 1997 – open – shared 1st place with Valery Chekhov, 2010 and 2011 – open – 1st place).

Stanisław Kostyra reached his career highest rating on 1 January 1986, with a score of 2400 points, then shared 13th–15th place among Polish chess players.

Stanisław Kostyra has a 2nd coaching class, currently trains youth at the chess club MUKS Stoczek 45 Białystok.
