= Kostyra =

Kostyra is a surname. Notable people with the surname include:

- Eugene Kostyra (1947–2020), Canadian politician
- Martha Stewart (née Kostyra in 1941), American businesswoman, writer, and television personality
- Stanisław Kostyra (born 1951), Polish chess master
