= Nörda Karwia =

Association football club in Karwia, Poland

KS Nörda Karwia
- Full name: Klub Sportowy Nörda Karwia
- Founded: 1994; 32 years ago
- Chairman: Jarosław Dettlaff
- Manager: Przemysław Szweda
- League: Klasa B Gdańsk I
- 2025–26: 3rd of 13
- Website: nordakarwia.futbolowo.pl
colours	colours

Nörda Karwia is a football club based in Karwia, Kashubia, Poland. As of the 2025–26 season, the club finished 3rd in Klasa B, the eighth level in the Polish league pyramid. The club is notable both for incorporating the Kashubian language in its name and for playing in the most northerly football league ground in Poland.

== History ==
The club was founded in 1994 and had its most successful period from 2008, when Nörda spent five seasons in the Klasa A. Their most successful campaign was the 2008–09 season in which they finished 8th in the Klasa A with 38 points. After taking over at the end of 2017 the current manager, Jarosław Pieper, prevented the club dissolving and kept them in the league. Under Pieper's tutelage the team managed to reach 5th place in the Klasa B 2019 season and aimed to fight for a higher position the following season.

== Ground ==
Nörda plays at Stadion Boisko w Karwii, the most northerly league football stadium of any football club in Poland. The ground is located just 50 metres from the Baltic Sea. In 2008, the club's pitch was destroyed by wild boar.

== Colours ==
The club's home strip incorporates the yellow and blue colours of the regional club Arka Gdynia who have a strong fanbase in the town.
