= Polish 141st Fighter Escadrille =

141. Fighter Escadrille was a unit of the Polish Air Force at the start of the Second World War. The unit was attached to the Pomorze Army.

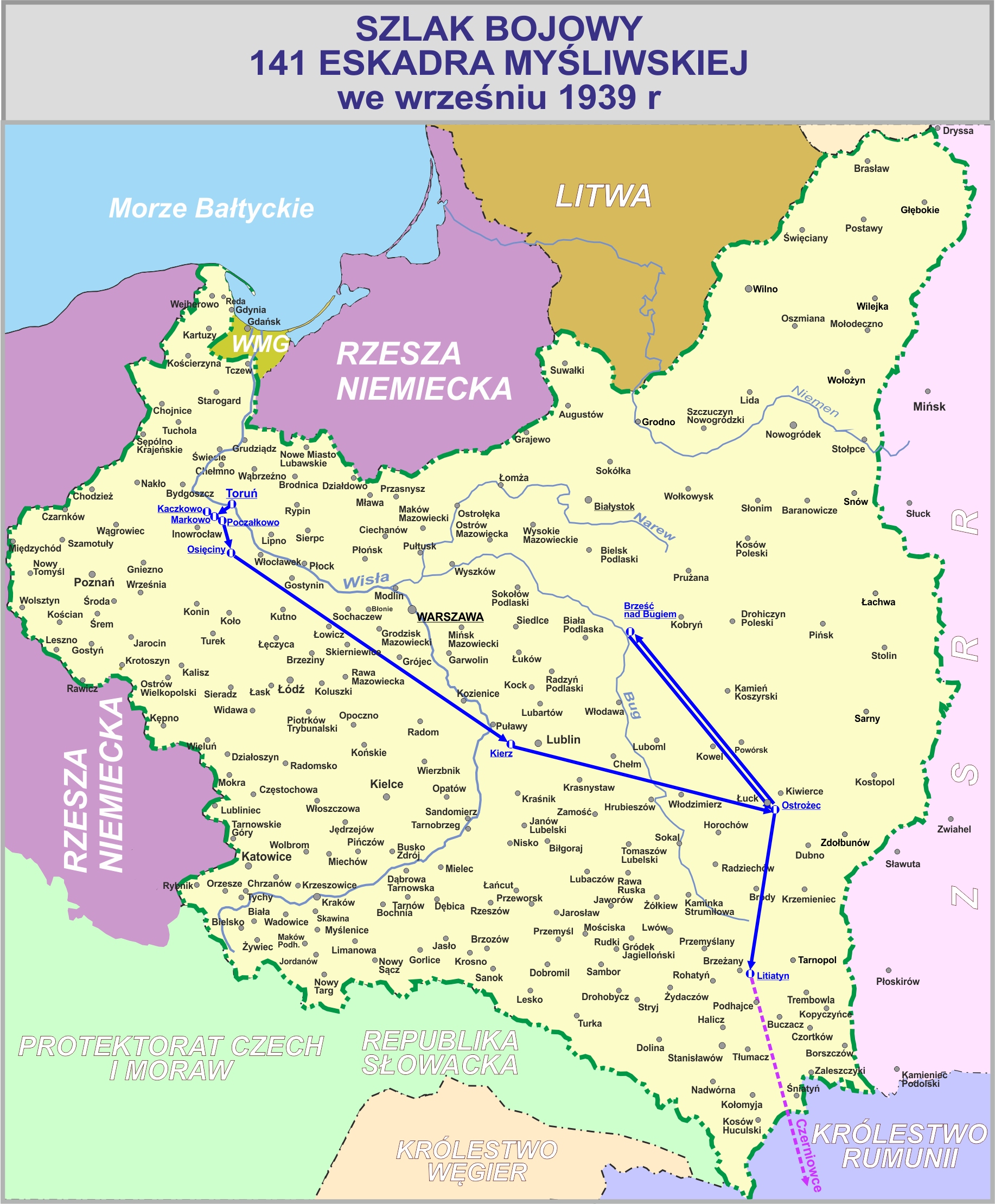

Equipment: 10 PZL P.11c airplanes.

== Air Crew ==
Commanding officer: kpt. pil. Tadeusz Rolski; deputy commander: por. pil. Marian Pisarek

Pilots:

- ppor. Lech Czechowicz-Lachowicki
- ppor. Edward Jankowski
- ppor. Adam Łabiszewski
- ppor. Władysław Różycki
- ppor. Władysław Urban
- pchor. Franciszek Czajkowski
- pchor. Zygmunt Drybański
- pchor. Zdzisław Laghammer
- kpr. Jan Budziński
- kpr. Józef Jeka
- kpr. Benedykt Mielczyński
- kpr. Władysław Wiśniewski
- st. szer. Zygmunt Delatowski

== See also ==
- Polish Air Force order of battle in 1939
