= Ostrowo, Puck County =

Ostrowo
- Village
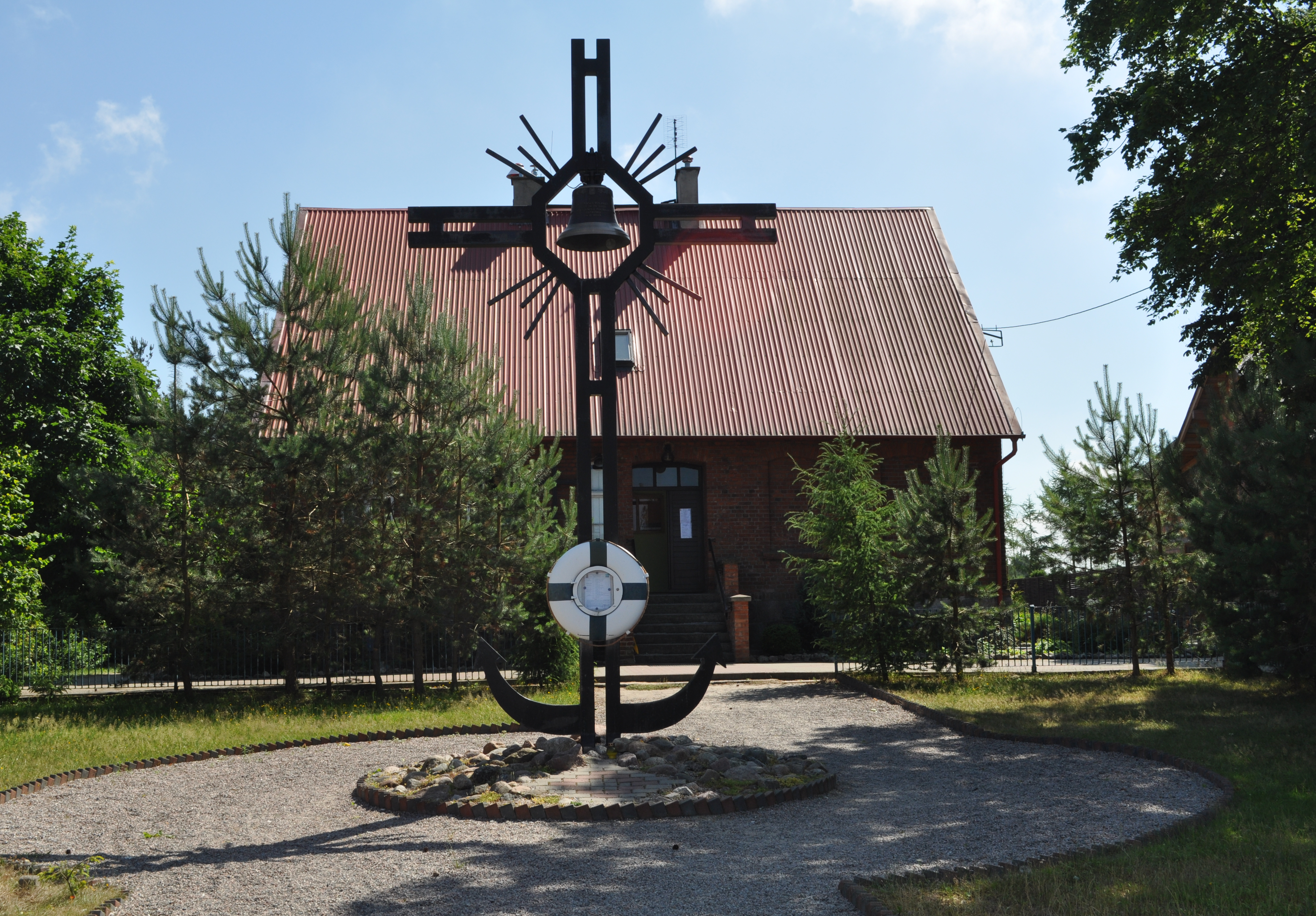
- Chapel in Ostrowo

- Location within Poland
- Coordinates: 54°49′31″N 18°14′42″E
- Country: Poland
- Voivodeship: Pomeranian
- County: Puck
- Gmina: Władysławowo
- Population: 605
- Time zone: UTC+1 (CET)
  - Summer (DST): UTC+2 (CEST)
- Vehicle registration: GPU

Ostrowo (German: Ostrau) is a village in the administrative district of Gmina Władysławowo, within Puck County, Pomeranian Voivodeship, in northern Poland. It is located within the ethnocultural region of Kashubia in the historic region of Pomerania. Prior to January 1, 2015, it was a part of the town Władysławowo.

== History ==
Ostrowo was a royal village of the Polish Crown, administratively located in the Puck County in the Pomeranian Voivodeship. In 1552 King Sigismund II Augustus renewed the old lost privilege of the village, which was later confirmed by Kings Władysław IV Vasa, John II Casimir Vasa and John III Sobieski.
