= Chałupy =

- Village
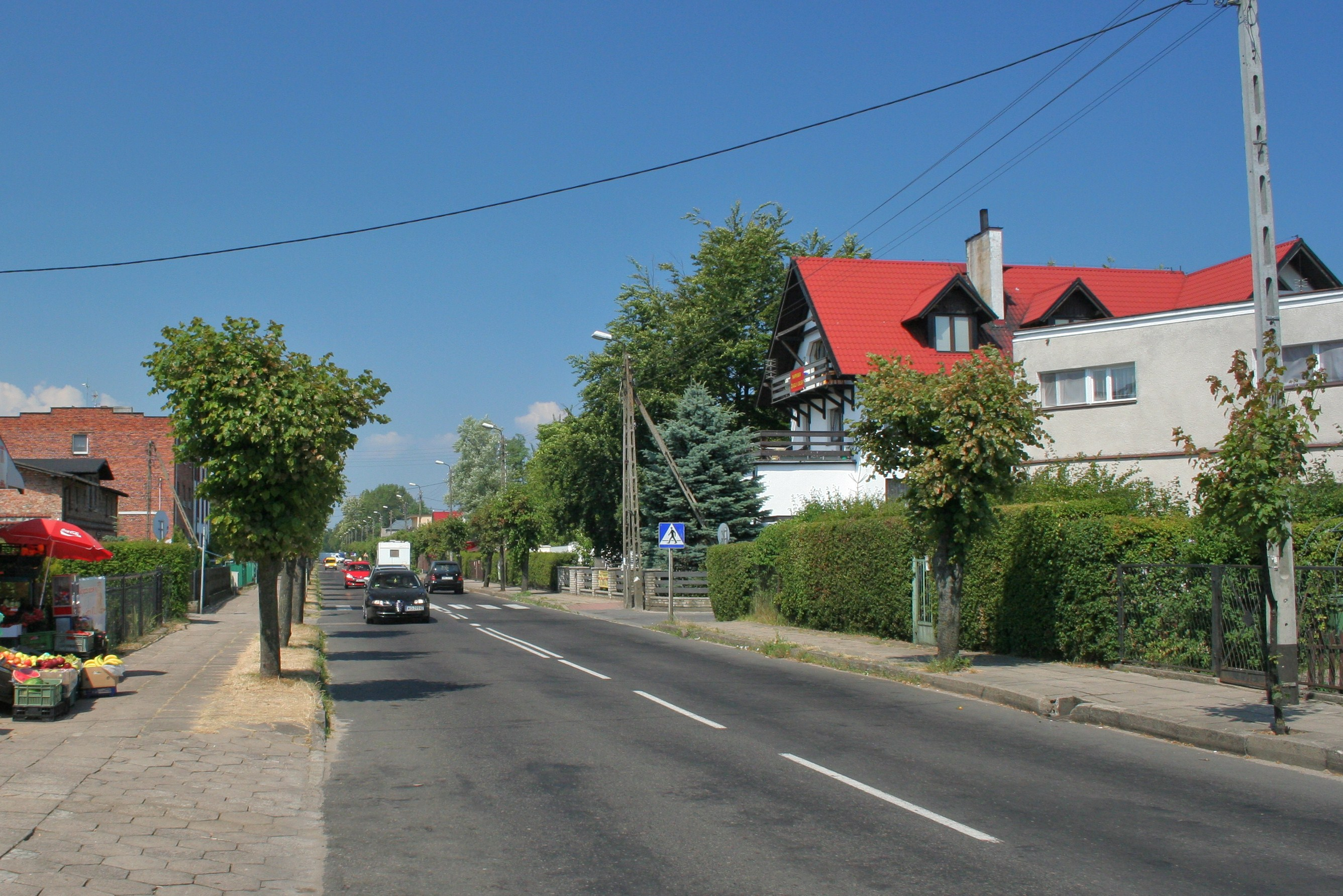
- Voivodeship road no 216 in Chałupy

- Location within Poland
- Coordinates: 54°46′N 18°31′E
- Country: Poland
- Voivodeship: Pomeranian
- County: Puck
- Gmina: Władysławowo
- Population (2009): 376
- Postal code: 84-120
- Area code: +48 58

Chałupy (Kashubian: Chalëpë or Chałëpë, German: Ceynowa, 1942-1945 Ziegenhagen) is a seaside resort and a Polish village with conditions favorable for windsurfing and kitesurfing, in Gmina Władysławowo. It is situated between Władysławowo and Kuźnica on the Hel Peninsula on the southern Baltic Sea in Puck County, Pomeranian Voivodeship, northern Poland. Its population in 2009 was 376.

In 1836 the village was the site of one of the last, if not the last, lynchings related to accusations of sorcery, when a widow Krystyna Ceynowa was killed by a mob after being accused of being a witch.

In 1939 the village saw some fighting during the battle of Hel. The Germans captured it on 25 September, and around the same time, in its vicinity, Polish military engineers detonated torpedo warheads, temporarily transforming the Peninsula's far end into an island.

Before 1 January 2015, Chałupy was part of the town of Władysławowo.

Toward the last years of communist rule in Poland the locality became famous as the site of a government-legal nudist beach.

Near the village there is also a nudist beach, commemorated by Zbigniew Wodecki in the song Chałupy welcome to.

== Gallery ==
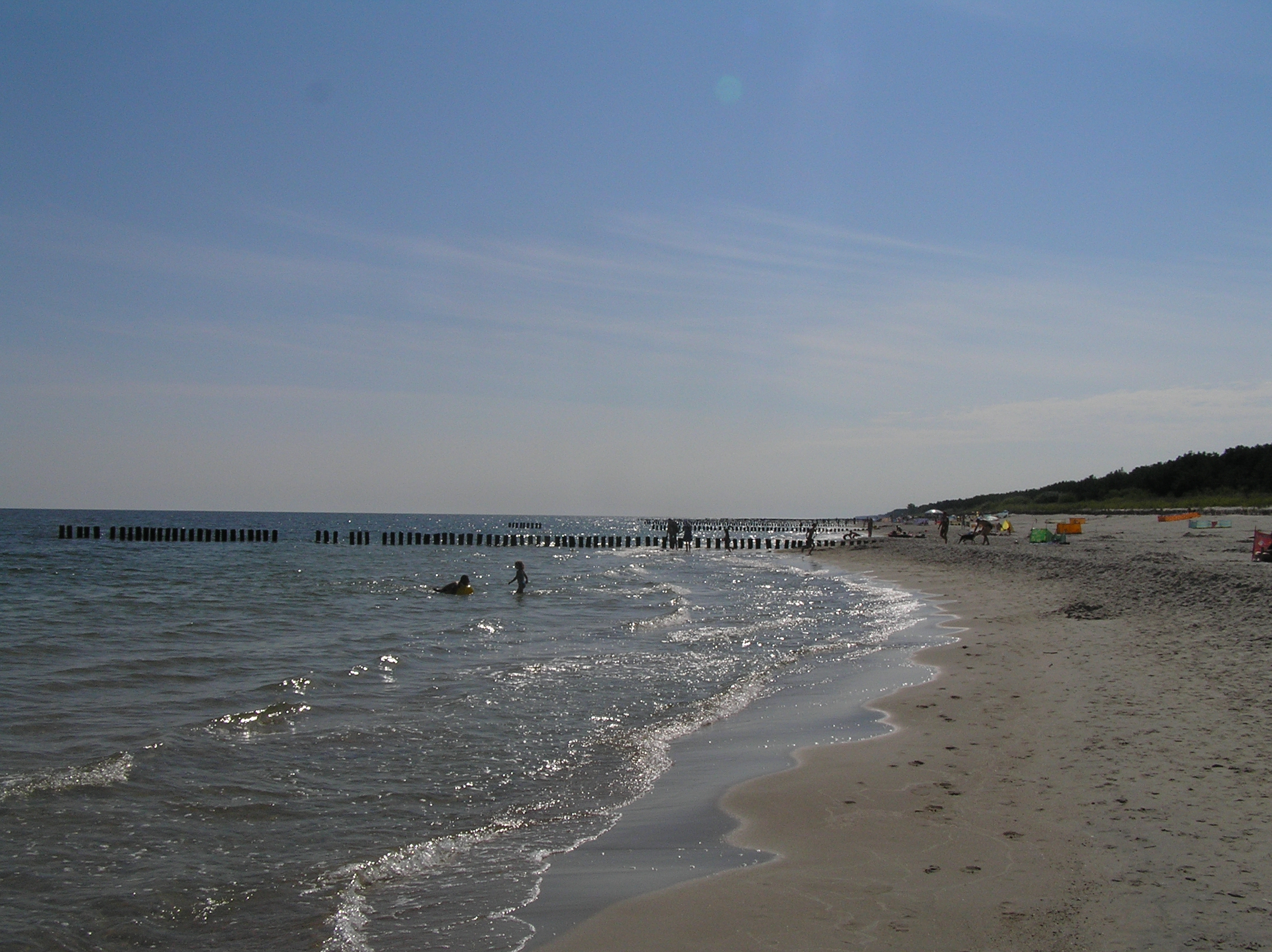
Beach in Chałupy

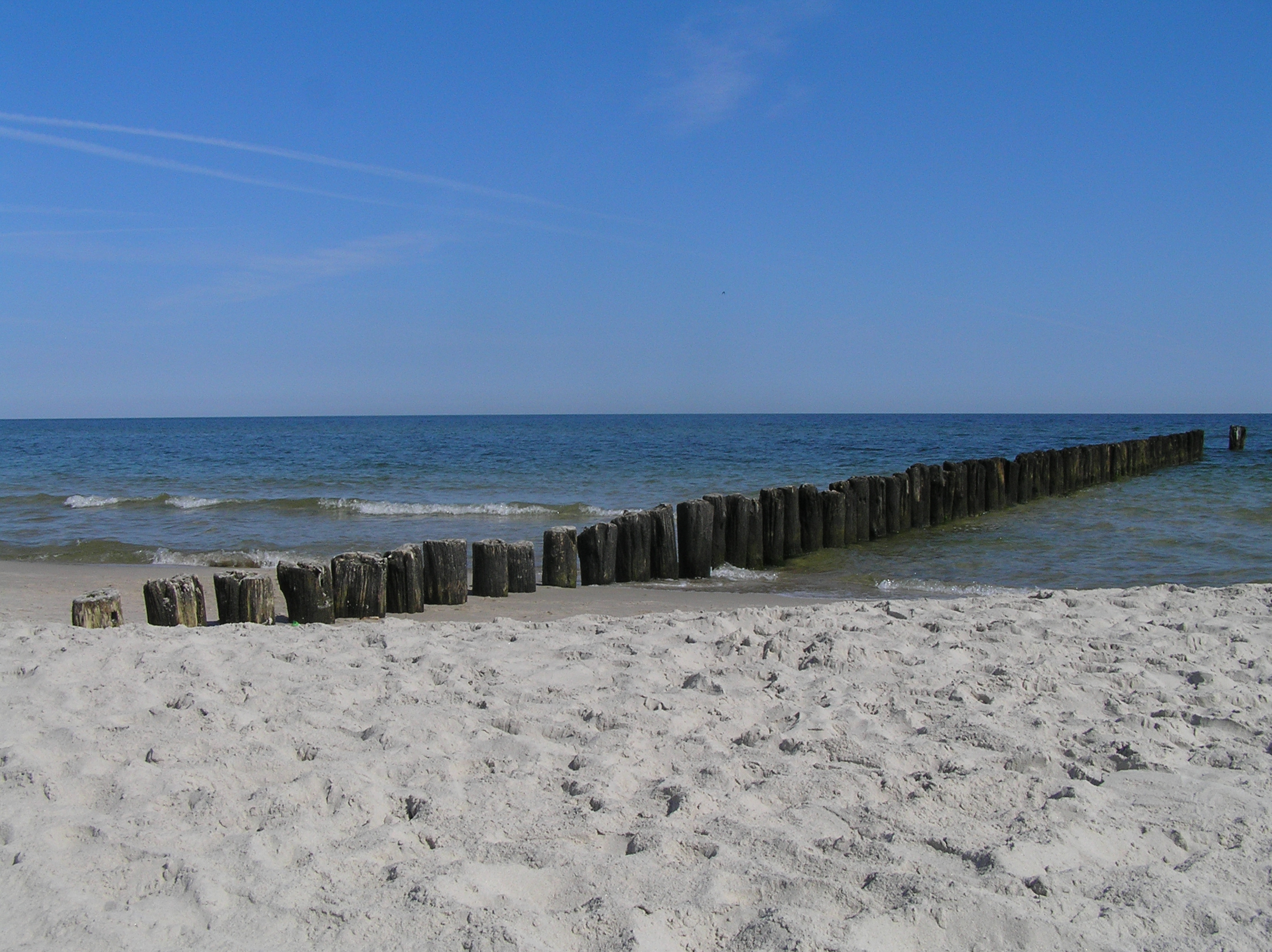

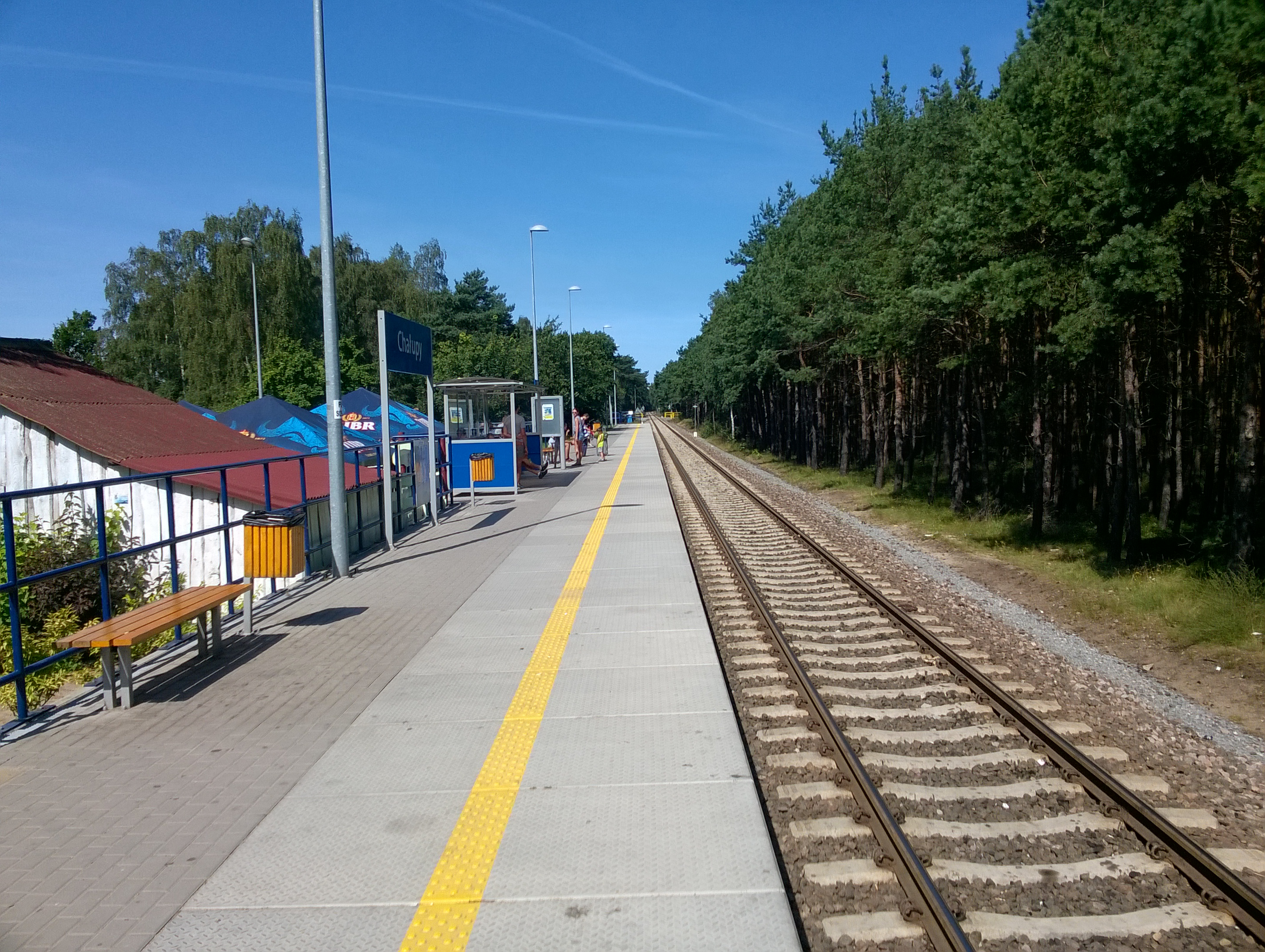
Chałupy train station

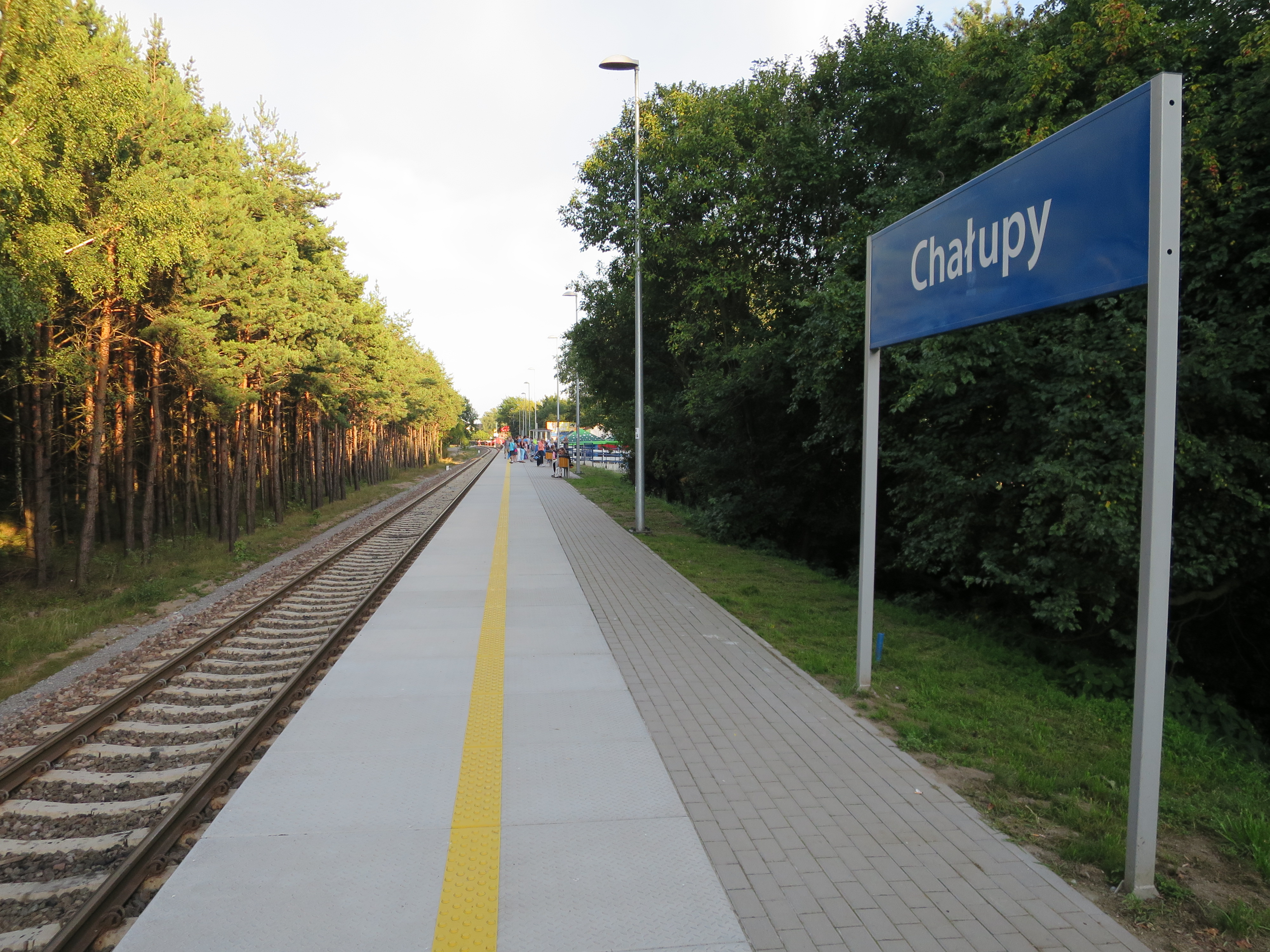

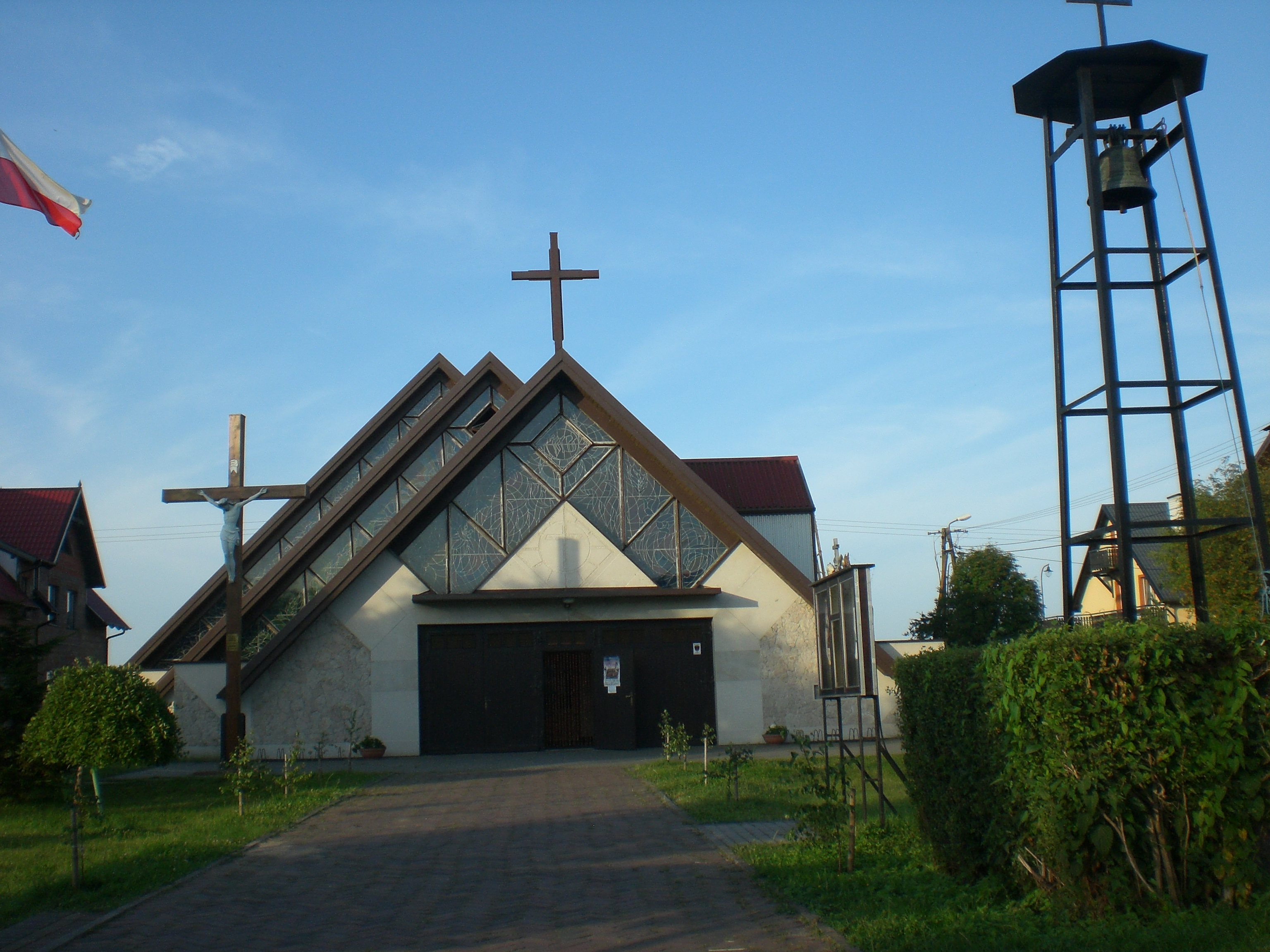
Church in Chałupy
