= Marcin Krzyżanowski =

Polish chess grandmaster (born 1994)

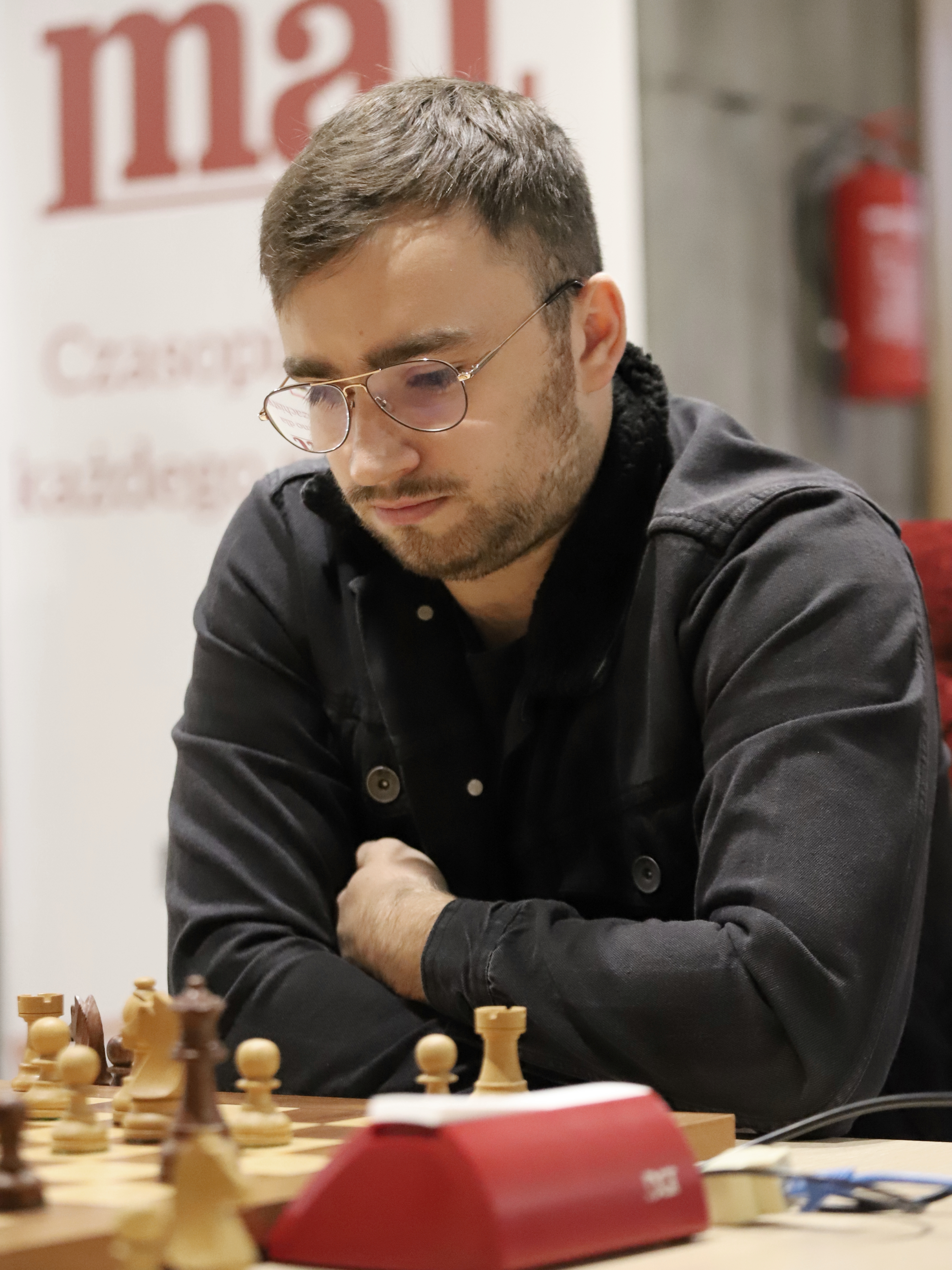
- Marcin Krzyżanowski in 2021

Personal information
- Born: 11 January 1994 (age 32) Rybnik, Poland

Chess career
- Country: Poland
- Title: Grandmaster (2020)
- FIDE rating: 2493 (July 2026)
- Peak rating: 2542 (January 2023)

Marcin Krzyżanowski (born 11 January 1994) is a Polish chess Grandmaster (GM) (2020).

== Biography ==
Marcin Krzyżanowski took part in the finals of the Polish Youth Chess Championships many times in various age groups and winning 7 medals: two gold (Szczawno-Zdrój 2008 - U14 age group, Karpacz 2010 - U16 age group), silver (Kołobrzeg 2004 - U10 age group) and four bronze (Kołobrzeg 2006 - U12 age group, Turawa 2007 - U14 age group, Chotowa 2009 - U16 age group, Solina 2012 – U18 age group). He is also a two-time medalist of Polish Youth Chess Team Championship: gold (Ustroń 2010 - for chess club KS Polonia Trade Trans Warszaw) and bronze (Gorzów Wielkopolski 2008 - for chess club MKSz Rybnik).

Marcin Krzyżanowski played for Poland several times at the European Youth Chess Championships and World Youth Chess Championships, achieving the best result in 2010 in Porto Carras, where he took the 7th place in the World Youth Chess Championship in U16 age group. He met norm for the title of International Master (IM) three times, at tournaments in Frýdek-Místek (2009, shared 1st place), Rybnik (2009, PREFROW CUP tournament, shared 1st place ) and Cappelle-la-Grande Open (2010). In 2012, he won the gold medal in Pardubice in European Youth Team Chess Championship in U18 age group. In 2013, he took second place (behind Vladimir Malaniuk) in Zakopane and won in Rybnik. In 2014, he took first place in the Roman Bąk memorial in Chorzów and in the Open chess tournament in Pszczyna. In 2015, he won the Open chess tournaments, played in Rybnik and Jastrzębia Góra.

In 2014, Marcin Krzyżanowski was awarded the FIDE International Master (IM) title and received the FIDE Grandmaster (GM) title six years later. The highest rating in his career so far – 2535 points – he was reached on 1 April 2022.
