= No. 306 Polish Fighter Squadron =

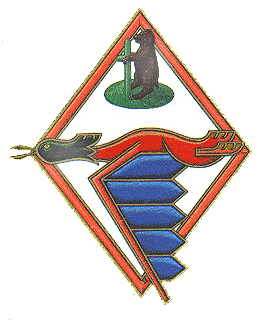
- 306 Squadron logo
- Active: 1940–1947
- Country: United Kingdom
- Allegiance: (Poland) Polish government in exile
- Branch: Royal Air Force
- Role: Fighter Squadron
- Part of: RAF Fighter Command
- Nickname: Toruń

Commanders
- Notable commanders: Douglas Scott; Tadeusz Rolski; Józef Jeka, DFM

Insignia
- Squadron codes: UZ (August 1940 – January 1947)

No. 306 "Toruń" Polish Fighter Squadron (Polish: 306 Dywizjon Myśliwski "Toruński") was a Polish fighter squadron formed in Great Britain as part of an agreement between the Polish Government in Exile and the United Kingdom in 1940. It was one of 15 squadrons of the Polish Air Force in exile that served alongside the Royal Air Force in World War II.

== History ==
Formed on 29 August 1940 at RAF Church Fenton, the squadron inherited the traditions, along with the emblem and a large part of the initial crew, of the pre-war Polish Torunian Fighter Squadron. The bear climbing a tree (Coat of arms of Madrid) was an emblem of the No. 605 (County of Warwick) Squadron, the unit of the first (British) commander of the new squadron, F/Cdr. Douglas Scott.

In the course of its existence, the squadron claimed 68 confirmed kills, 16½ probable, and 26 damaged. Moreover, the crews of the 306 brought down 59 V1 flying bombs. It was disbanded on 6 January 1947 after the end of World War II.

== Commanding officers ==
From	To	Name	Remark
Aug 1940	Dec 1940	S/Ldr. Douglas R. Scott	British Officer
4 September 1940	17 October 1940	Kpt. pil. Tadeusz Rolski	ad interim Polish co-commander
18 October 1940	11 November 1940	Maj. pil. Jerzy Orzechowski	Polish co-commander
Dec 1940	Mar 1941	S/Ldr. D.E. Gilliam, DFC, AFC	British Officer
12 November 1940	30 June 1941	Kpt. pil. Tadeusz Rolski	First as co-commander, from March 1941 as Squadron Leader
1 July 1941	14 August 1941	Kpt. pil. Jerzy Zaremba	
15 August 1941	29 August 1941	Por. pil. Jerzy Słoński-Ostoja, VM	
30 August 1941	14 April 1941	Maj. pil. Antoni Wczelik	
15 April 1941	22 August 1942	Kpt. pil. Tadeusz Czerwiński, KW	
23 August 1942	13 March 1943	Kpt. pil. Kazimierz Rutkowski, DFC	
14 March 1943	1 January 1944	Kpt. pil Włodzimierz Karwowski	
2 January 1944	7 June 1944	Kpt. pil. Stanisław Łapka	
8 June 1944	23 June 1944	Kpt. pil. Janusz Marciniak	
27 June 1944	25 September 1944	Kpt. pil. Paweł Niemiec	
26 September 1944	24 May 1945	Kpt. pil. Józef Żulikowski	
25 May 1945	May 1946	Kpt. pil. Józef Jeka, DFM	
May 1946	Jan 1947	Kpt. pil. Tadeusz Andersz	

== Aircraft ==
- Hawker Hurricane Mk I – from 4 September 1940
- Hawker Hurricane Mk IIA – from 5 April 1941
- Supermarine Spitfire Mk I and Mk II – from 12 July 1941
- Supermarine Spitfire Mk VB – from 11 December 1941
- Supermarine Spitfire Mk IX – from 29 November 1942
- Supermarine Spitfire Mk VB – from 13 March 1943
- North American Mustang Mk III – from 26 March 1944

== See also ==
- Polish Air Forces in France and Great Britain
- Military history of Poland during World War II
