= Gmina Władysławowo =

Gmina Władysławowo Władysławowo Commune
- Gmina
- Flag Coat of arms

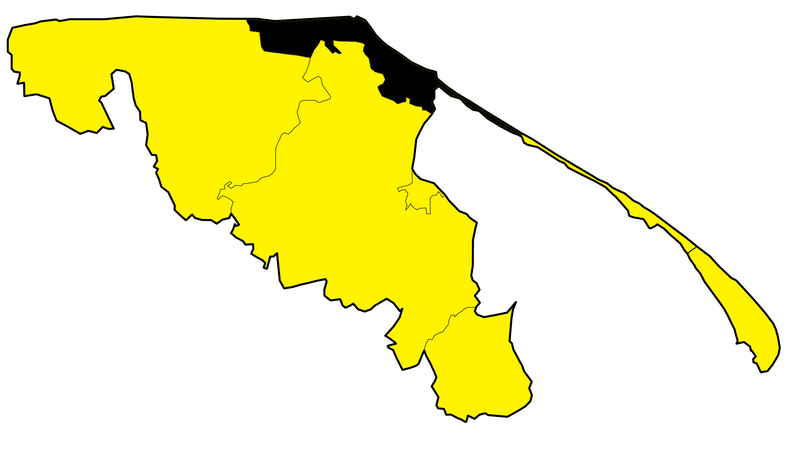
- Coordinates (Władysławowo): 54°47′35″N 18°24′51″E
- Country: Poland
- Voivodeship: Pomeranian
- County: Puck
- Seat: Władysławowo

Area
  - Total: 39.22 km^{2} (15.14 sq mi)

Population (2013)
  - Total: 15,400
  - Density: 393/km^{2} (1,020/sq mi)
- Website: https://wladyslawowo.pl/

Gmina Władysławowo is an urban-rural gmina (administrative district) in Puck County, Pomeranian Voivodeship, in northern Poland. Its seat is the city of Władysławowo.

The gmina covers an area of 39.22 square kilometres (15.1 sq mi), and as of 2013 its total population was around 15,400.

In years 1973-2014, gmina constituted an urban gmina. This changed on January 1, 2015, when it became an urban-rural gmina.

== Villages ==
Apart from the town of Władysławowo, Gmina Władysławowo contains seven villages: Chałupy, Chłapowo, Jastrzębia Góra, Karwia, Ostrowo, Rozewie and Tupadły.
