= Karwia =

Village in Kashubia

Karwia Karwiô
- Village
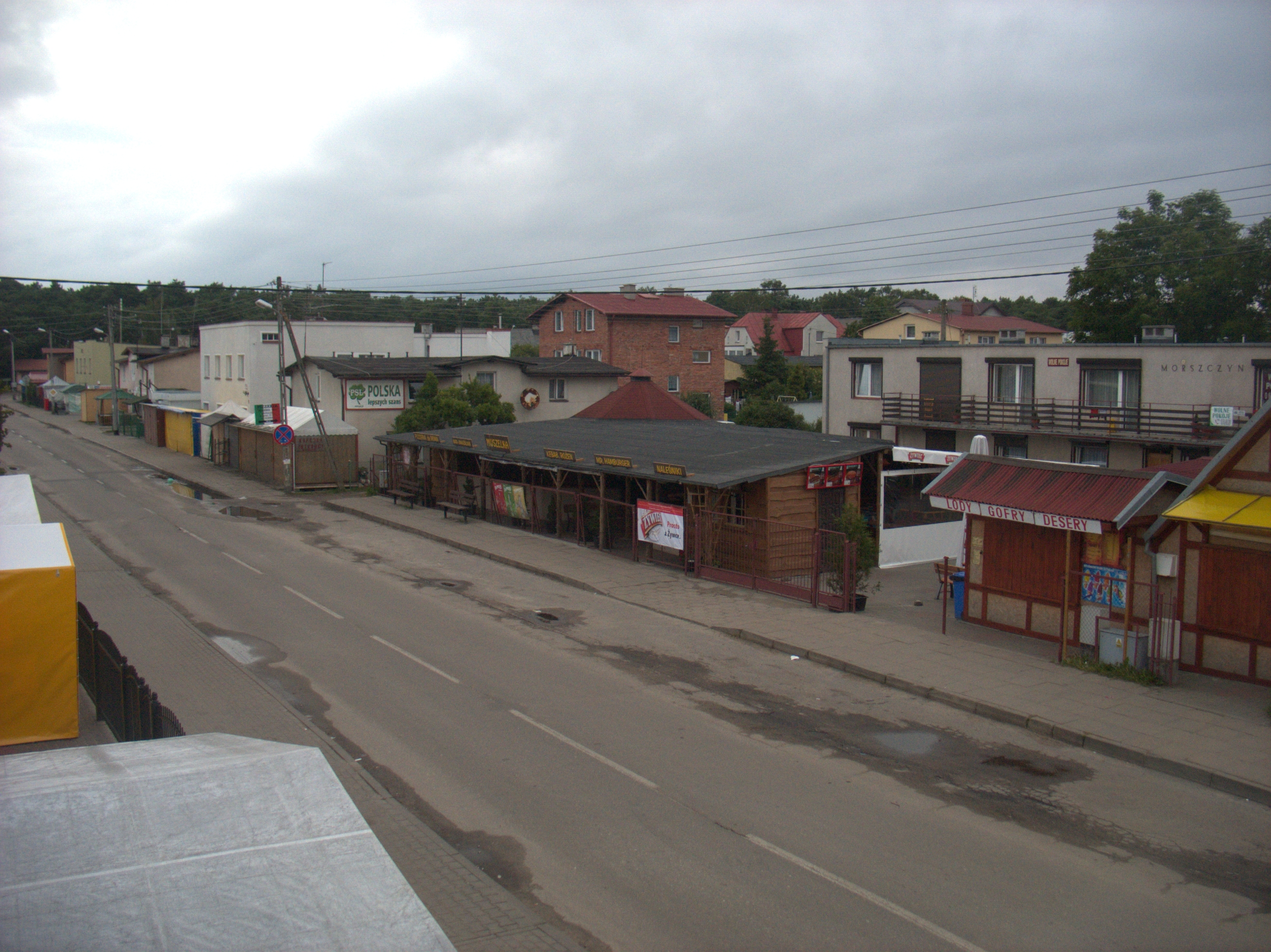

- Location within Poland
- Coordinates: 54°49′51″N 18°12′36″E
- Country: Poland
- Voivodeship: Pomeranian
- County: Puck
- Gmina: Władysławowo
- Population: 931
- Time zone: UTC+1 (CET)
  - Summer (DST): UTC+2 (CEST)
- Vehicle registration: GPU

Karwia (Kashubian: Karwiô; German: Karwen) is a village in the administrative district of Gmina Władysławowo, within Puck County, Pomeranian Voivodeship, in northern Poland, located on the south coast of the Baltic Sea. It is located within the ethnocultural region of Kashubia in the historic region of Pomerania. Prior to January 1, 2015, it was a part of the town Władysławowo. Karwia was a royal village of the Polish Crown, administratively located in the Puck County in the Pomeranian Voivodeship.

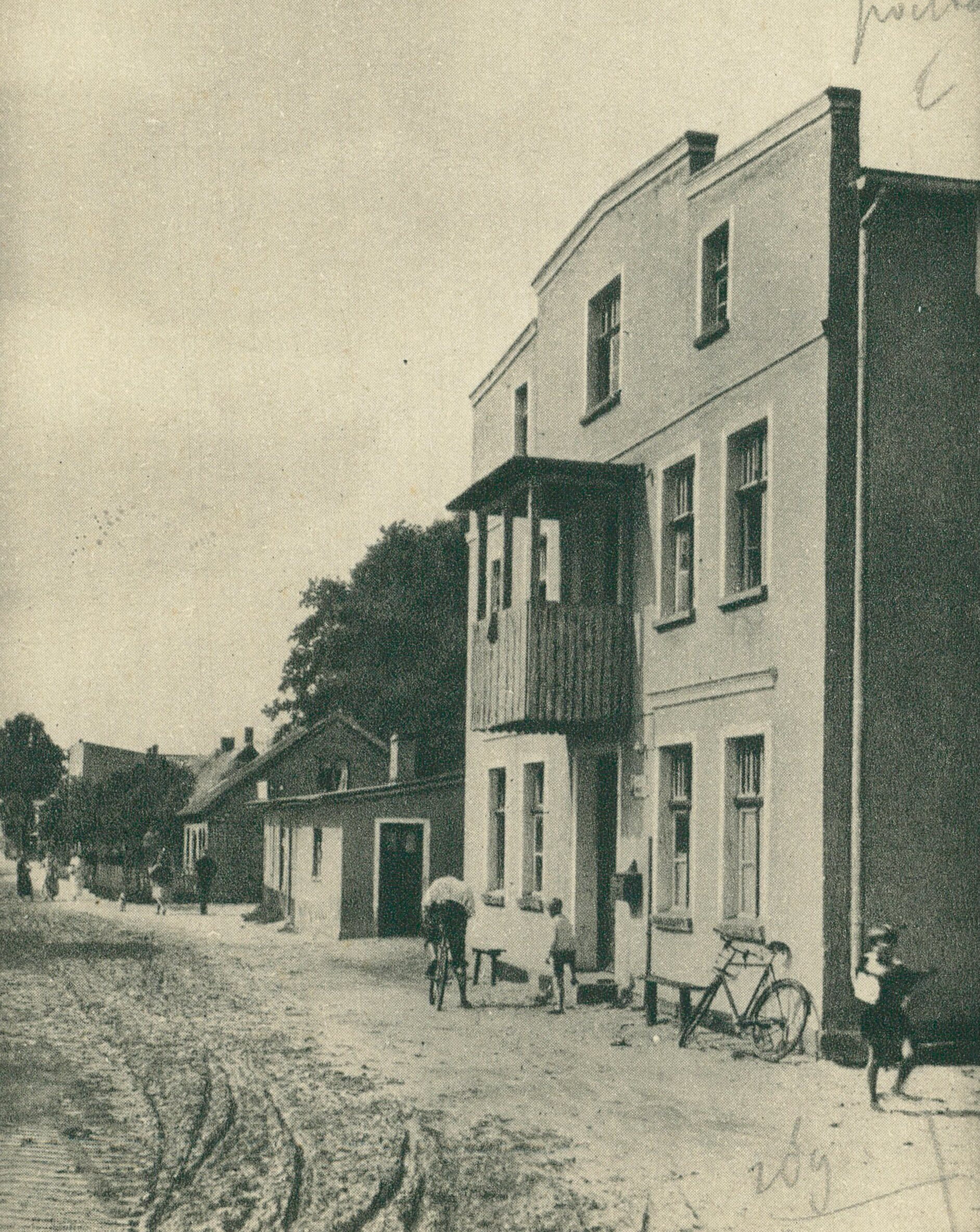
The main street in the interwar period

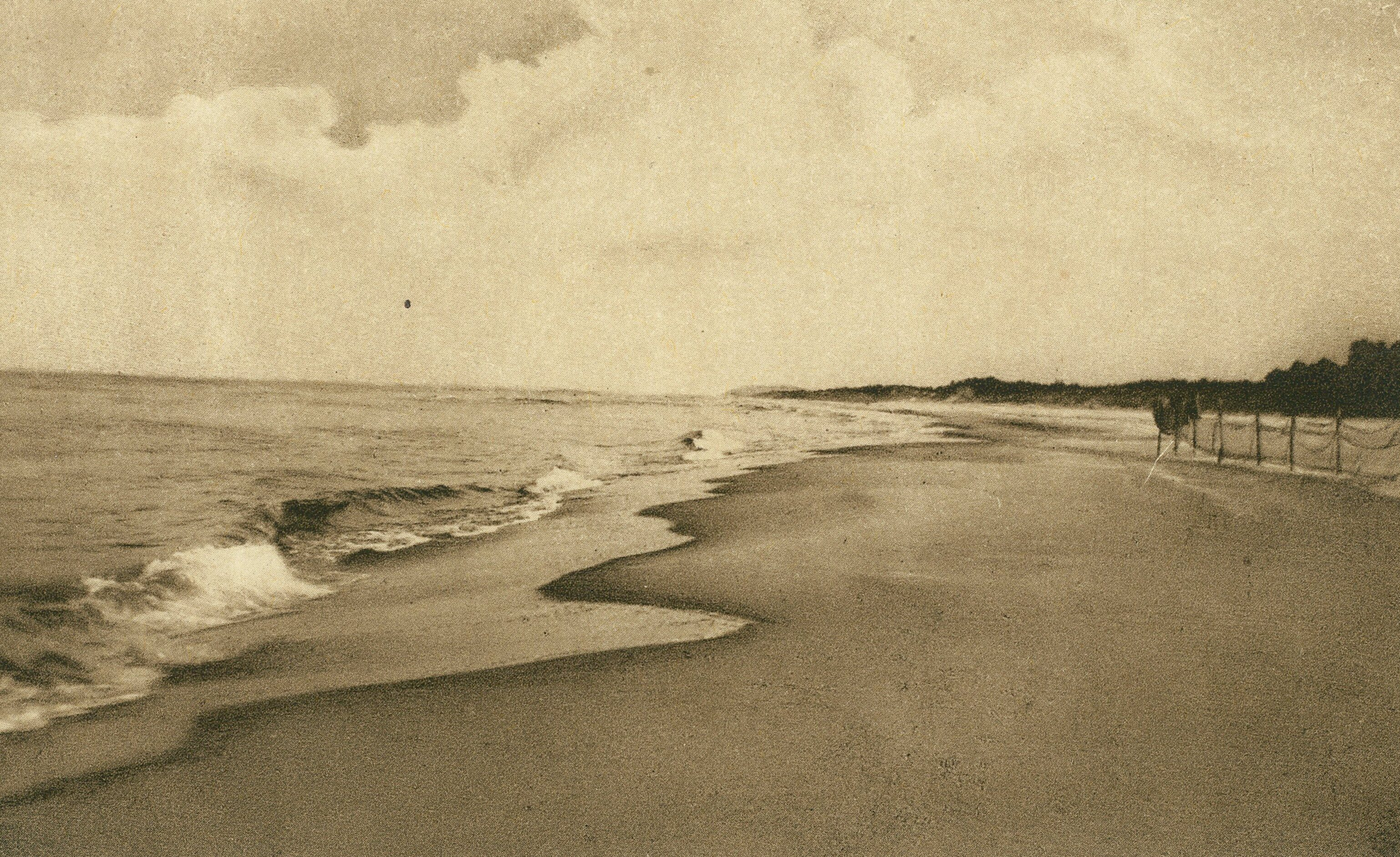
Beach, before 1929

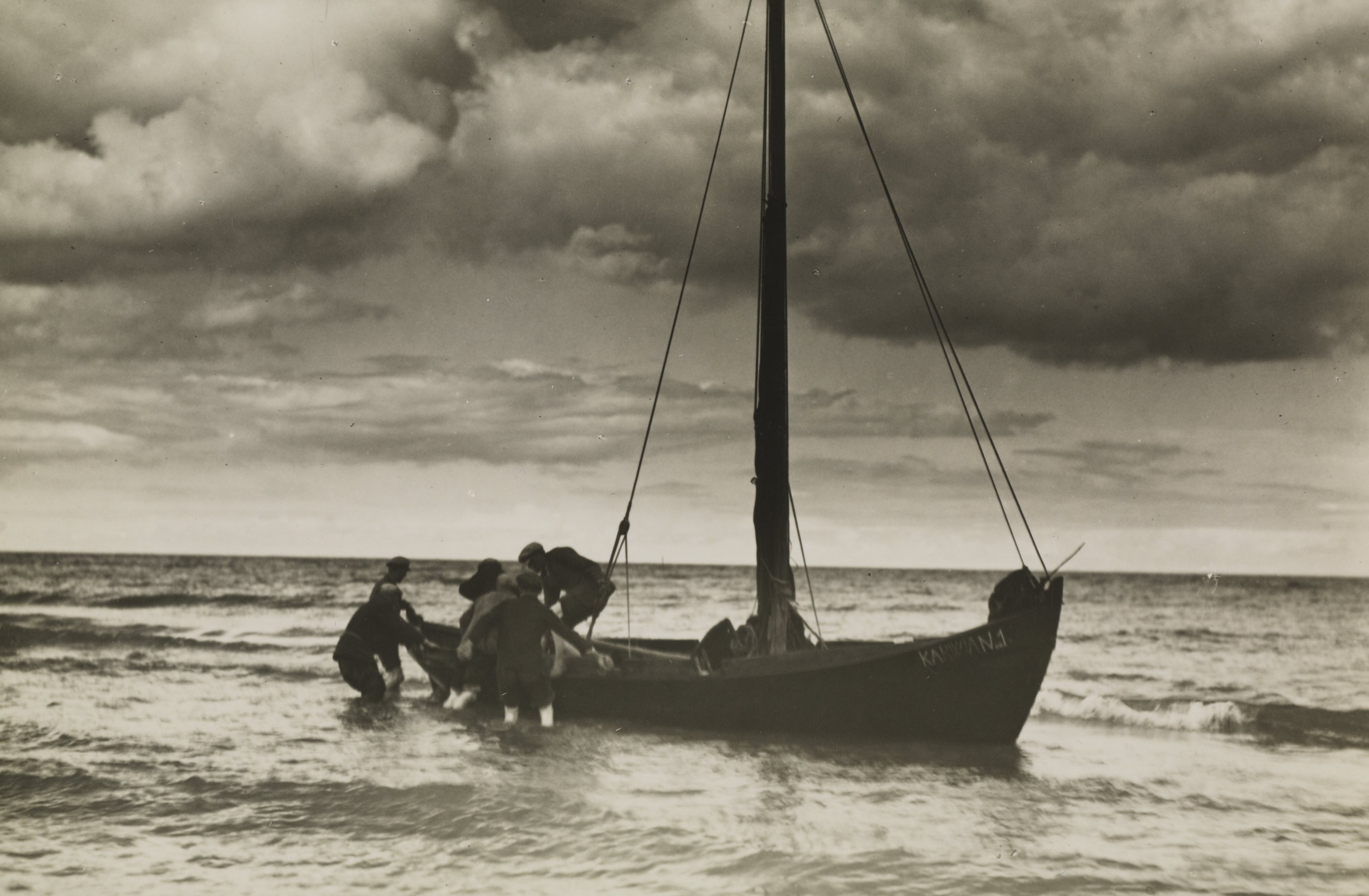
Fishermen in Karwia, before 1939

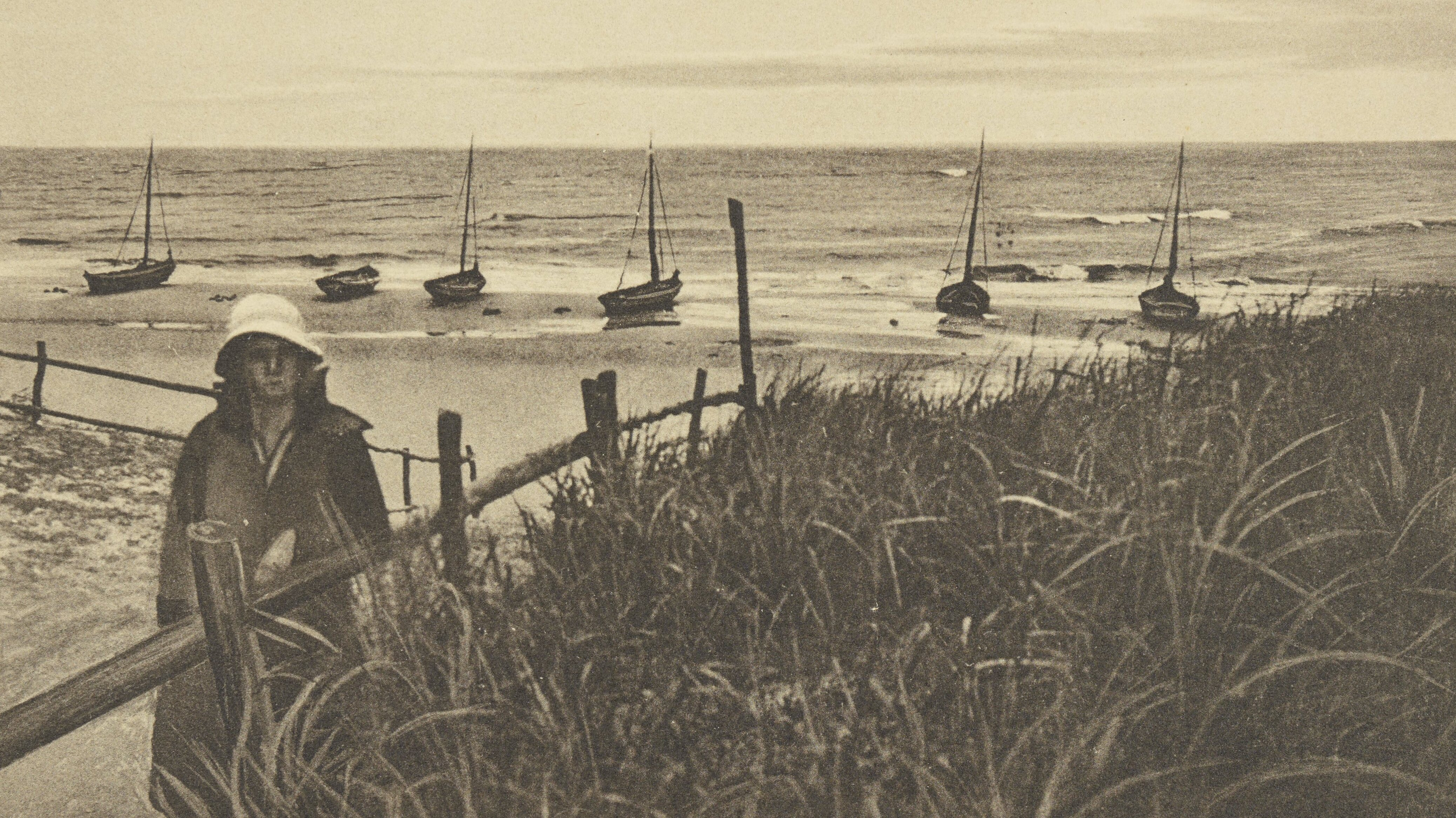
Sea coast in Karwia, 1925

== Sport ==
The village is represented by the football club Nörda Karwia.

== Notable people ==
- Jan Romuald Byzewski (1842–1905), Catholic priest and founder of the Wiarus newspaper.
