= Tupadły, Pomeranian Voivodeship =

Tupadły
- Village
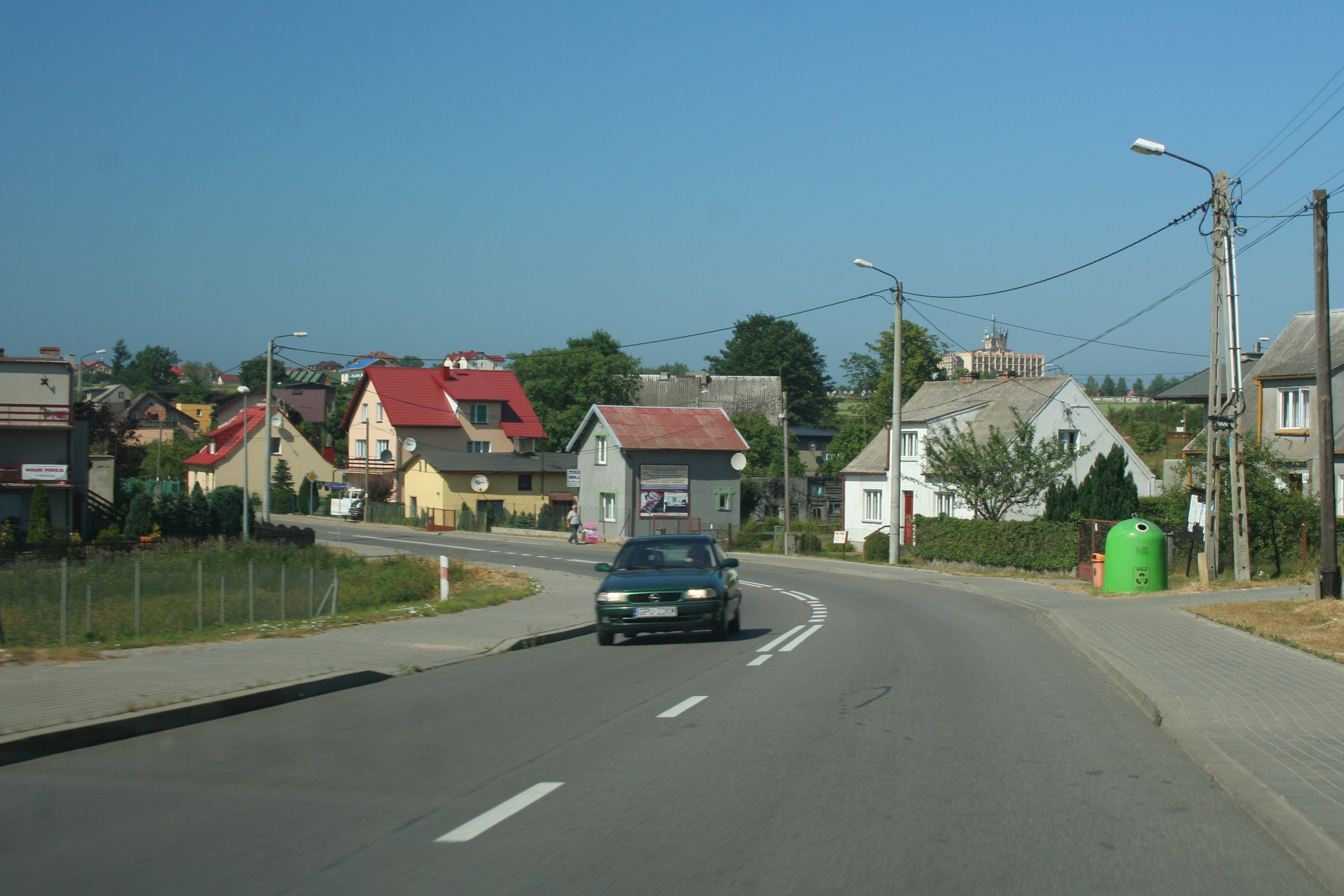
- Pucka Street in Tupadły

- Location within Poland
- Coordinates: 54°49′15″N 18°18′53″E
- Country: Poland
- Voivodeship: Pomeranian
- County: Puck
- Gmina: Władysławowo
- Population: 439
- Time zone: UTC+1 (CET)
  - Summer (DST): UTC+2 (CEST)
- Vehicle registration: GPU

Tupadły (German: Tupadel, 1942–45 Rixfelde) is a village in the administrative district of Gmina Władysławowo, within Puck County, Pomeranian Voivodeship, in northern Poland. It is located within the historic region of Pomerania. Prior to January 1, 2015, it was a part of the town Władysławowo.

Tupadły was a royal village of the Polish Crown, administratively located in the Puck County in the Pomeranian Voivodeship.

== Gallery ==
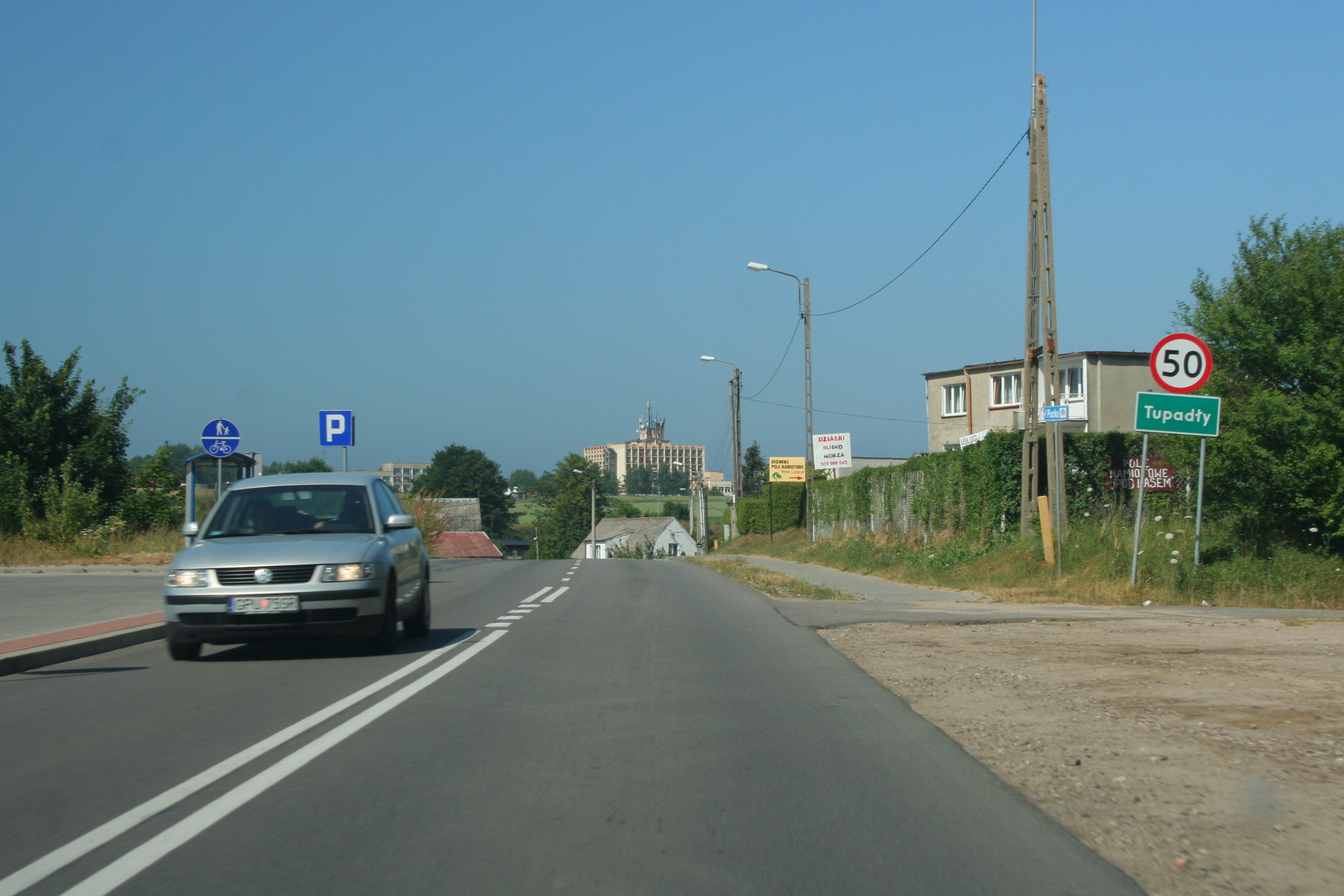
Pucka Street
