= Jastrzębia Góra =

- Village
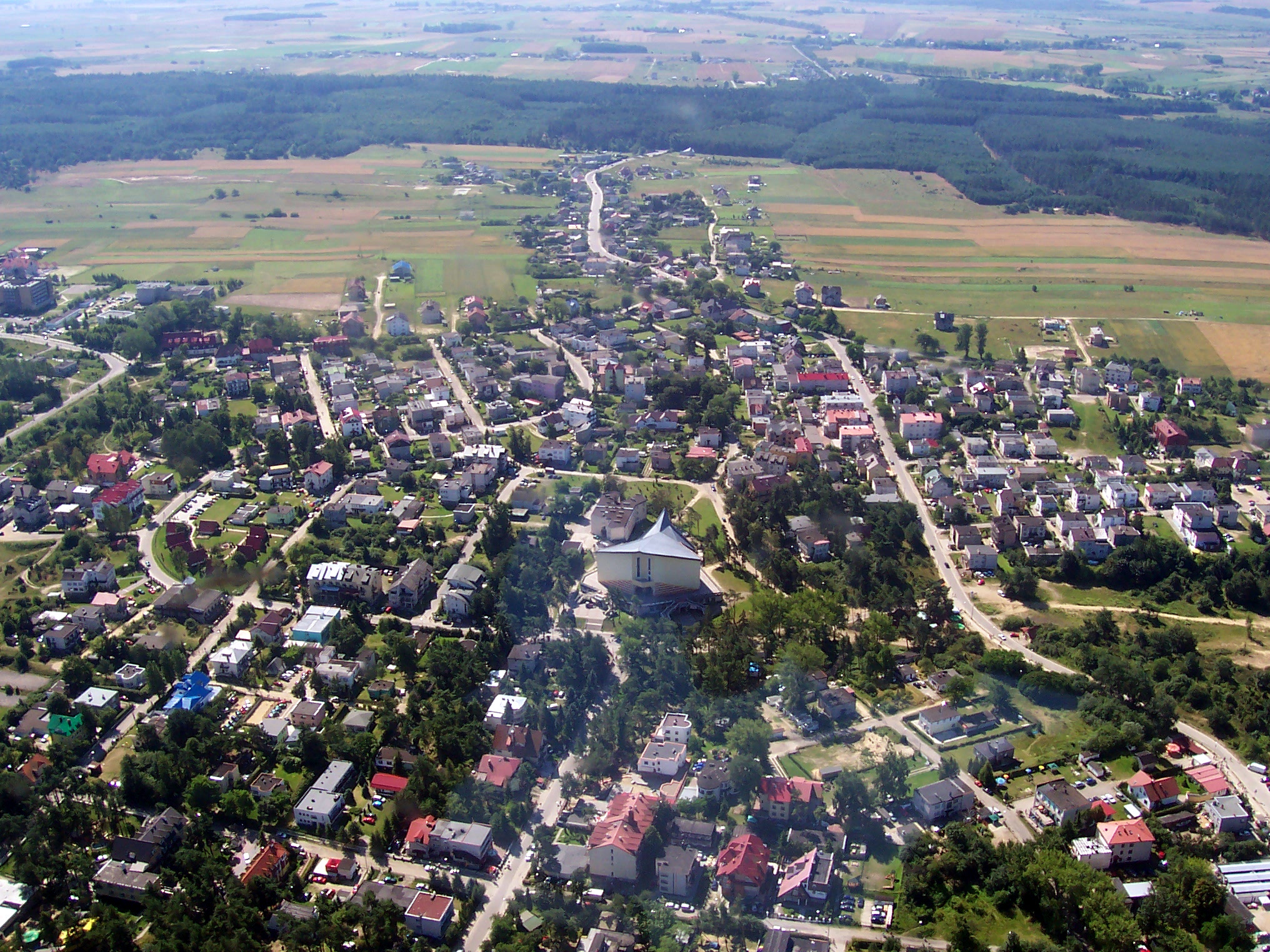
- Aerial view

- Location within Poland
- Coordinates: 54°49′53″N 18°18′46″E
- Country: Poland
- Voivodeship: Pomeranian
- County: Puck
- Gmina: Władysławowo
- Population: 1,068

Jastrzębia Góra (German: Habichtsberg) is a village on the south coast of the Baltic Sea in the Kashubia, in the administrative district of Gmina Władysławowo, within Puck County, Pomeranian Voivodeship, in northern Poland. Prior to January 1, 2015, it was a part of the town Władysławowo. It is the northern-most settlement in Poland.

== Gallery ==
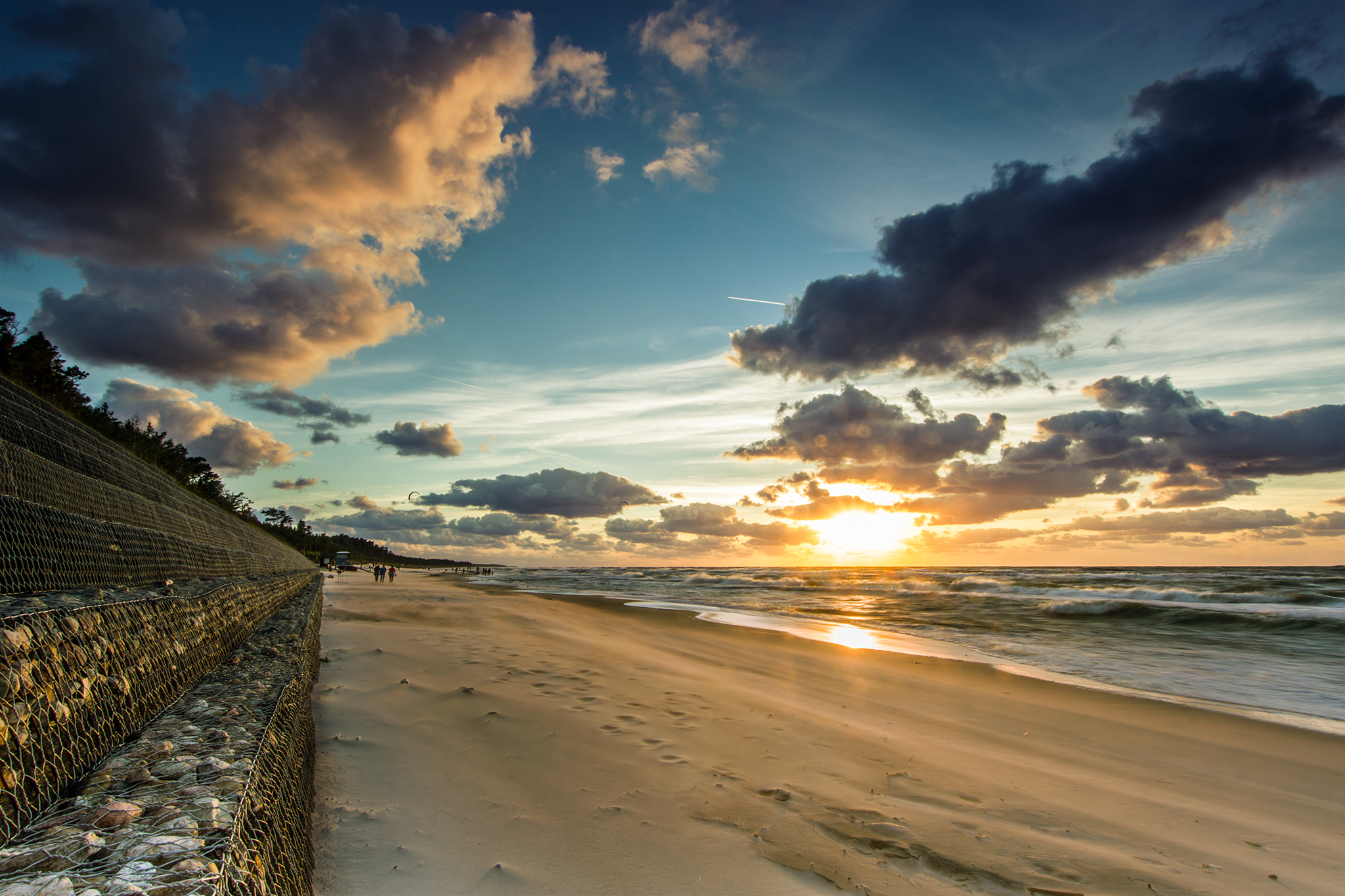
Beach at Jastrzębia Góra

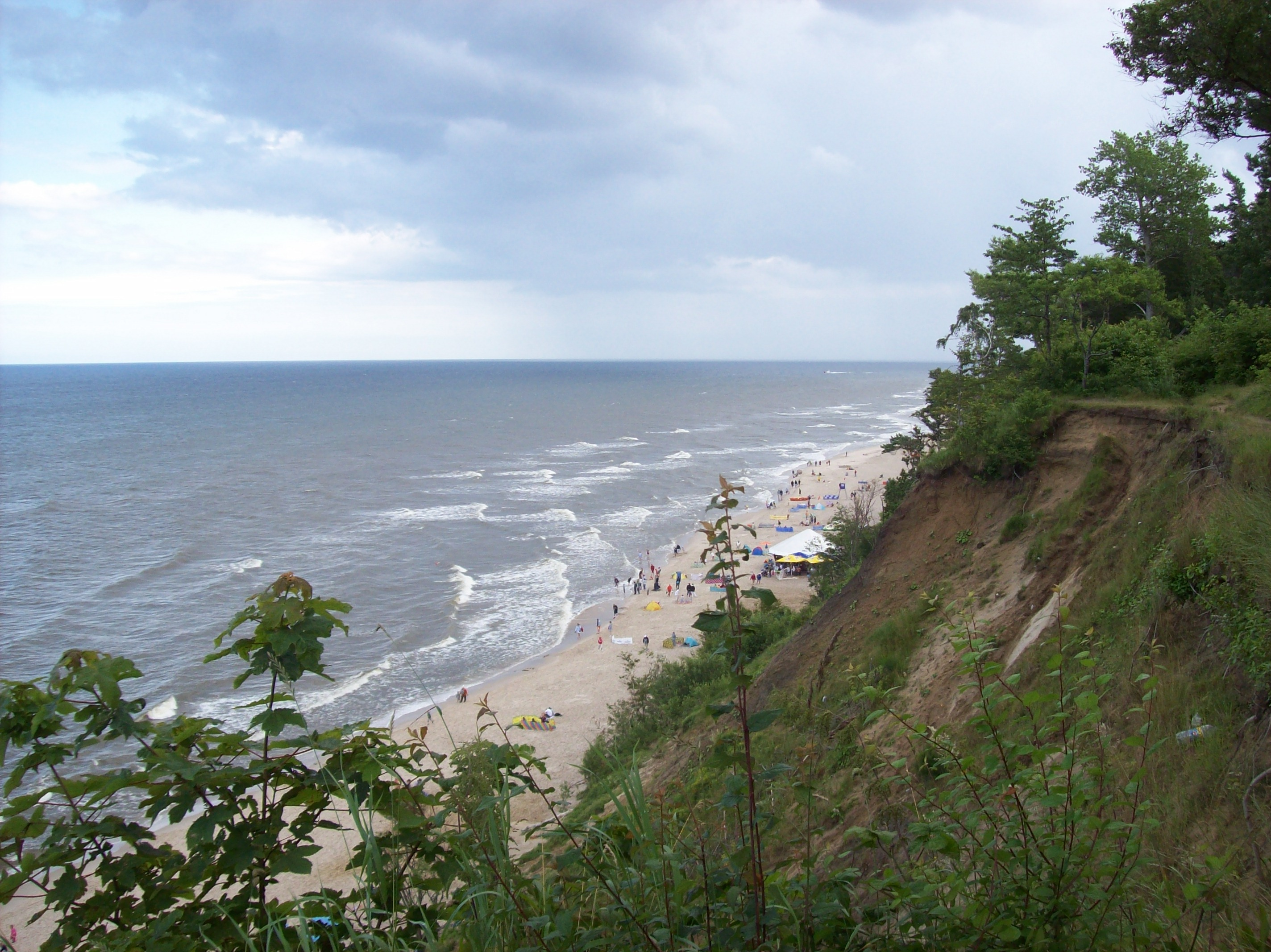

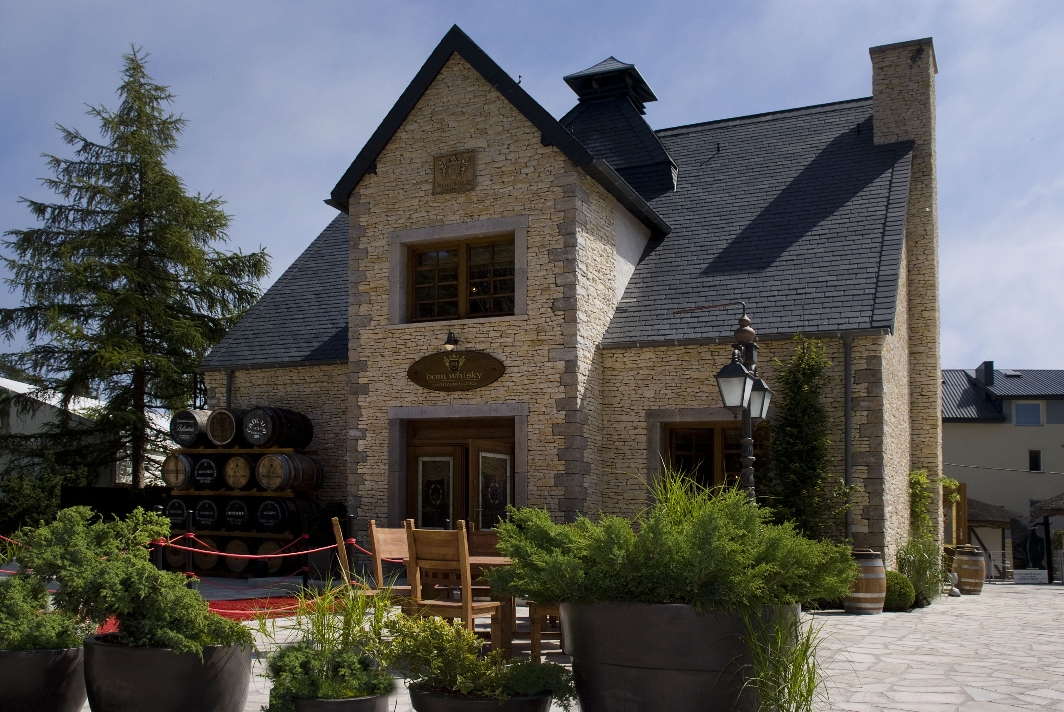
Whisky house, Jastrzębia Góra

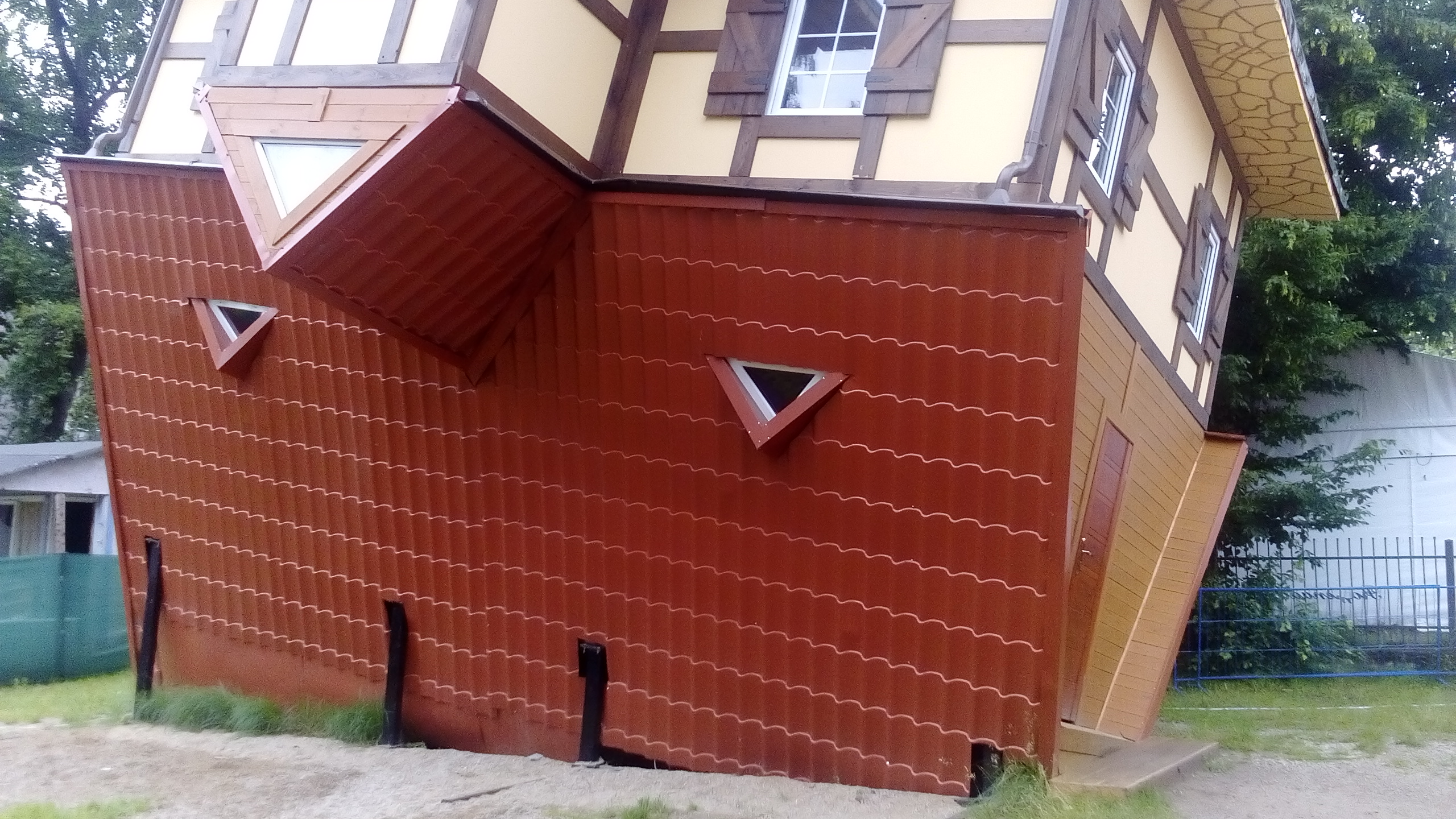
Upside down house in Jastrzębia Góra

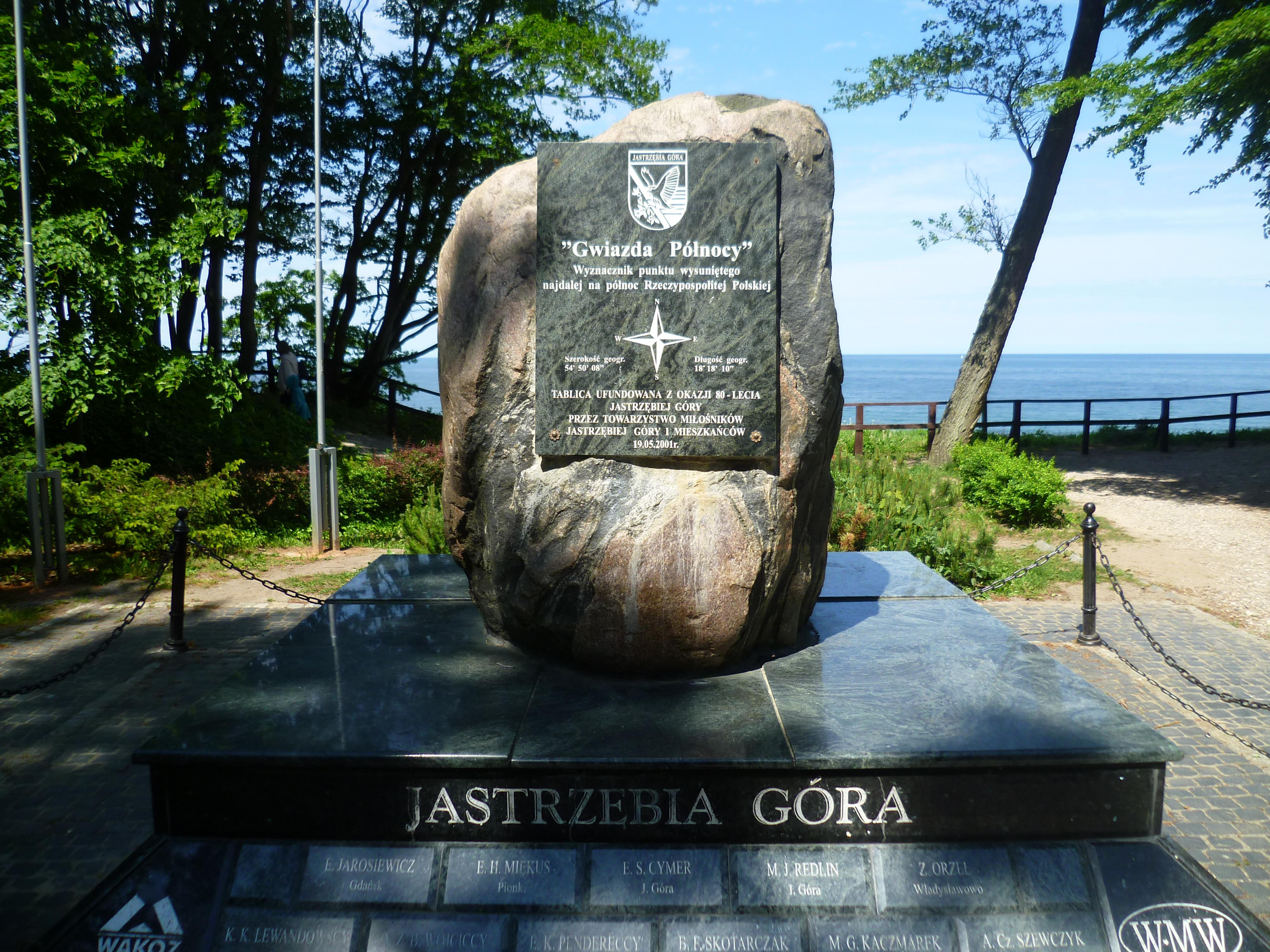
"North Star" the northernmost point in Poland

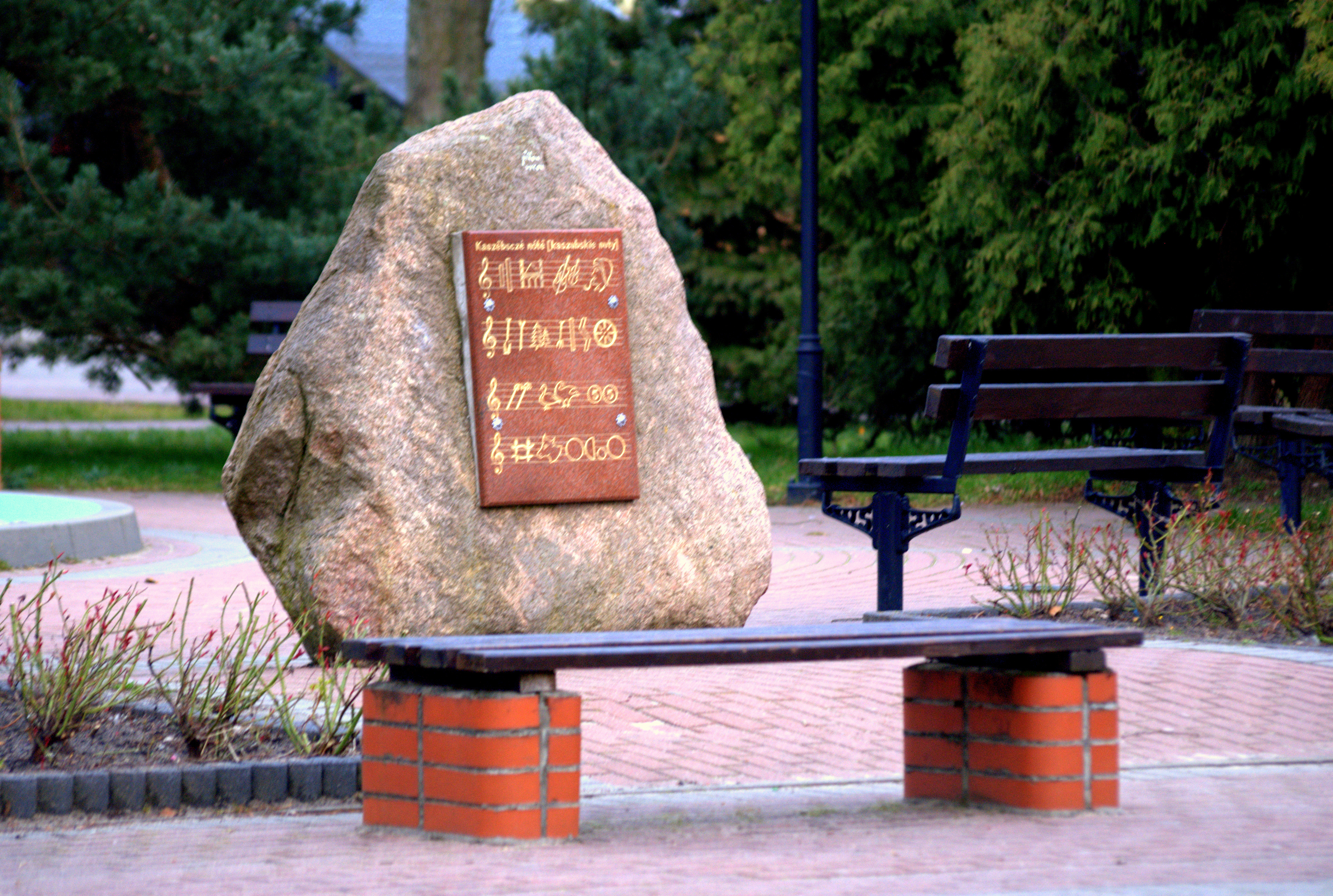
