= Aubourn Haddington and South Hykeham =

Former civil parish in Lincolnshire, England

Coordinates: 53.16°N 0.61°W

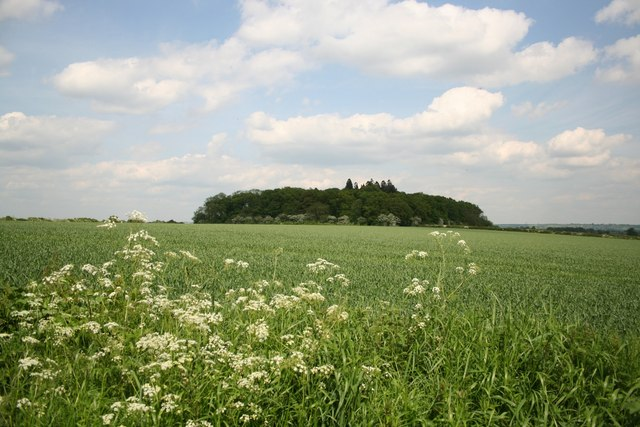
- The wood known as High Walks west of Haddington

- Location within Lincolnshire
- Population: 885 (2001 census)
- Civil parish: Aubourn with Haddington; South Hykeham
- District: North Kesteven
- Shire county: Lincolnshire
- Region: East Midlands
- Country: England
- Sovereign state: United Kingdom

Aubourn Haddington and South Hykeham is a former civil parish in the North Kesteven district of Lincolnshire, England. According to the 2001 census it had a population of 885.

The parish included the villages of Aubourn, Haddington and South Hykeham. The A46 (the old Fosse Way) formed the north-western border of the parish.

The composite parish was formed on 1 April 1931 from the separate parishes of Aubourn, Haddington, and South Hykeham in 1991 and order was made to dissolve the parish to become two separate parishes: Aubourn and Haddington and South Hykeham. However the order was deficient for failing to define a new boundary between South Hykeham and "Aubourn with Haddington". On 1 March 2011 the parish was abolished and split which implemented the 1990 order that was to come into effect in 1991.
