= A46 road =

Road in England

A46

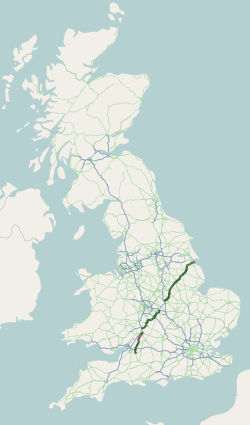

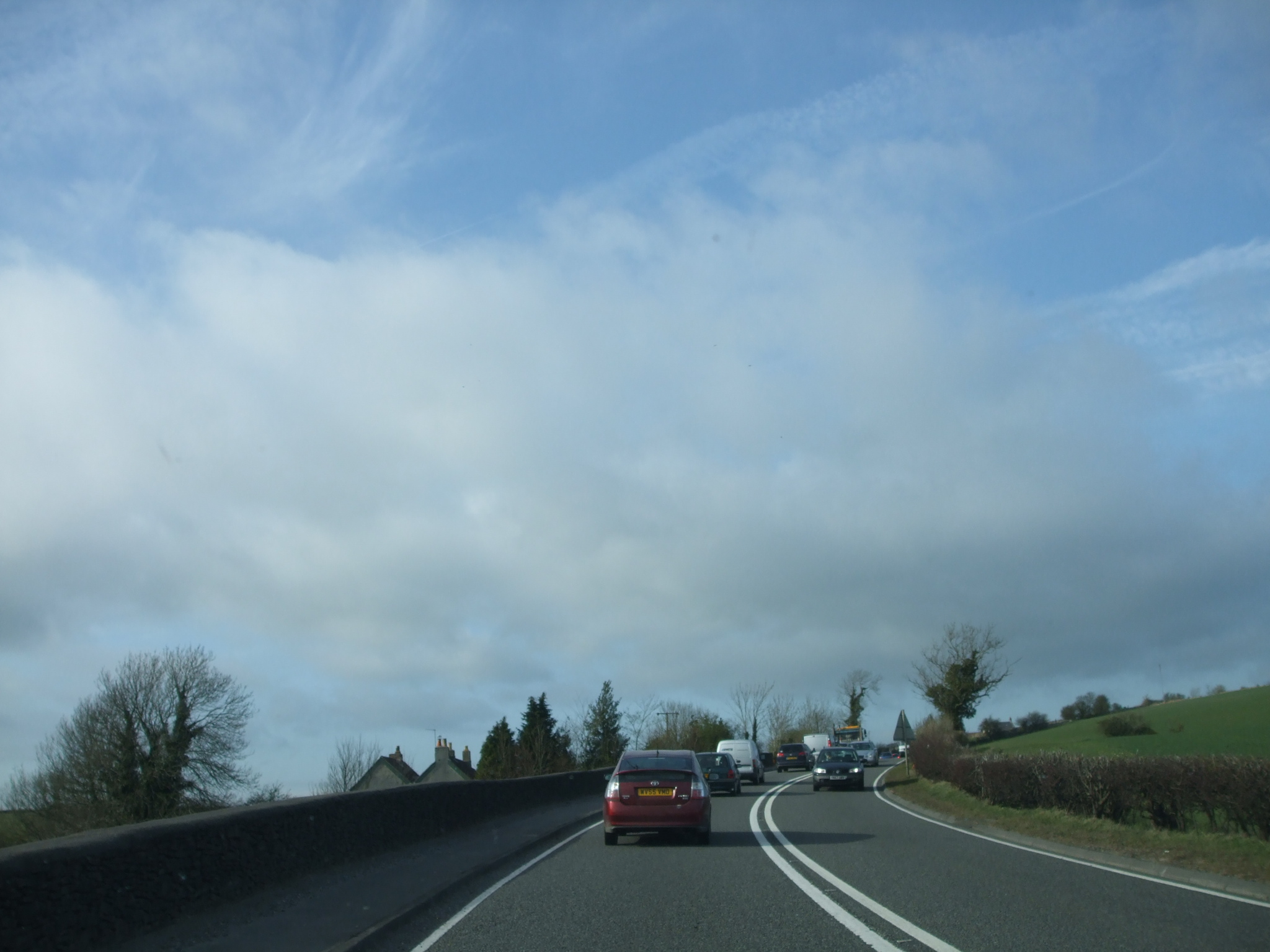
- A46 near Woolley and Swainswick

Route information
- Length: 183.5 mi (295.3 km)
- History: Construction completed: Warwick and Kenilworth Bypass – 1974; Newark-On-Trent Relief Road – October 1990; Leicester Western Bypass – November 1995; Lincoln Relief Road – December 1985; Newark to Widmerpool dualling – June 2012; Alcester to Evesham dual carriageway – August 1995

Major junctions
- From: A4 in Bath (51.397°N 2.336°W)
- M4 near Tormarton M5 in Tewkesbury M40 near Warwick M6 / M69 near Coventry M1 near Leicester

- To: A180 / A1098 in Cleethorpes (53.561°N 0.035°W)

Location
- Country: United Kingdom
- Counties: Somerset, Gloucestershire, Worcestershire, Warwickshire, West Midlands, Leicestershire, Nottinghamshire, Lincolnshire
- Primary destinations: Stroud, Cheltenham, Royal Leamington Spa, Coventry, Leicester, Newark-on-Trent, Lincoln

Road network
- Roads in the United Kingdom; Motorways; A and B road zones
← A45	→ A47

The A46 is a major A road in England. It starts east of Bath, Somerset and ends in Cleethorpes, Lincolnshire, but it does not form a continuous route. Large portions of the old road have been lost, bypassed, or replaced by motorway development. Between Leicester and Lincoln the road follows the course of the Roman Fosse Way, but between Bath and Leicester, two cities also linked by the Fosse Way, it follows a more westerly course.

== History ==
The original (1923) route of the A46 was from Bath to Laceby, passing through Cheltenham, Broadway, Stratford-on-Avon, Coventry, Leicester, Newark and Lincoln. Unusually for such a long road, no changes were made to its route until the 1970s. In recent years the central sections of the road have been rerouted and renumbered substantially, and there are now two sections where there are gaps of over 10 miles (16 km) where the road does not exist at all. The A46 has also been extended from Laceby to Grimsby and Cleethorpes – the road between Laceby and Grimsby was originally part of the A18. The section that connects Caistor and Nettleton has a couple of dangerous junctions.

The major realignments have been

- Between Coventry and Leicester the original road was downgraded to the B4065 and the B4114 as a result of the opening of the M69 motorway in 1977.
- Between Cheltenham and Stratford-on-Avon the road was realigned in the 1980s through Evesham on the former route of the A435 and A439. The original route through some of the most picturesque parts of the Cotswold Hills was downgraded to the B4632.
- The route was subsequently cut between Cheltenham and Teddington and that section became the A435 again. The A46 was diverted to connect with the M5 motorway on part of the former route of the A438.
- Between Evesham and north of Stratford the route was again realigned to run by Alcester and by-pass Stratford, partly on the former line of the A422. The previous route through Bidford-on-Avon to Stratford became the B439, and north of Stratford the old route became the A439.
- A new alignment was built from Junction 21a of the M1 to by-pass Leicester to the north. The old route through Leicester was redesignated the A5460 (Narborough Road, in the southwest) and A607 (Belgrave Road/Melton Road, in the northeast). The A607 deviates from the straight course of the Fosse Way, bypassing the village centres of Thurmaston and Syston.
- The A46 was realigned to by-pass Warwick, Kenilworth and Coventry, and the old route was redesignated the A429 and the A4600. It opened in June 1974.

Bypasses were also built around Market Rasen, Lincoln and Newark.

== Route ==
=== Cleethorpes – A1 (Newark) ===
The A46 starts at Isaac's Hill roundabout with the A1098 and the A180. It meets the A1031 at a roundabout and passes the King George V Stadium on the right. It meets the B1213 from the right, then crosses the A16 Peaks Parkway where it gains primary status. It heads into Grimsby, meeting the A1243 Bargate (former A16). It meets the B1444 where the road becomes a dual carriageway. It meets the A18 at a roundabout. This was the old terminus of the A46, and what is now the A46 heading east into Grimsby used to be the A18. The road becomes the single carriageway road once again and runs alongside the north part of the Lincolnshire Wolds. It bypasses Irby upon Humber and enters the East Midlands. It bypasses Swallow to the North. It climbs a hill to meet the B1225, A1173, and A1084 just east of Caistor. The road crosses the Nottingham – Grimsby railway at a level crossing. The road becomes very straight and flat, passing through Middle Rasen Plantation and meets the A1103 from the right. The A631 leaves to the right at a T junction. The road bypasses Dunholme to the south then it passes close to the former RAF Dunholme Lodge. It passes the headquarters for Lincolnshire Police on the left. It meets the A158 (for Skegness) and the B1182 (former route into Lincoln) at a roundabout.

The A46 Lincoln Relief Road is coincident with the A15. The A15 leaves to the right at a roundabout. The road becomes dual carriageway and traverses the Lincoln Cliff. It meets the A57 at the Carholme roundabout and crosses the Lincoln – Gainsborough railway. After bypassing Lincoln, it starts following the route of the old Fosse Way (bar bypasses). The A46 passes the former airfield of RAF Swinderby. The road becomes the boundary of Lincolnshire and Nottinghamshire for 1 mile (1.6 km). The road enters Nottinghamshire and the road bypasses Brough. The new section of road finishes at the roundabout with the A1133. The A17 joins from the left at a roundabout.

=== A1 (Newark) – M1 (Leicester) ===
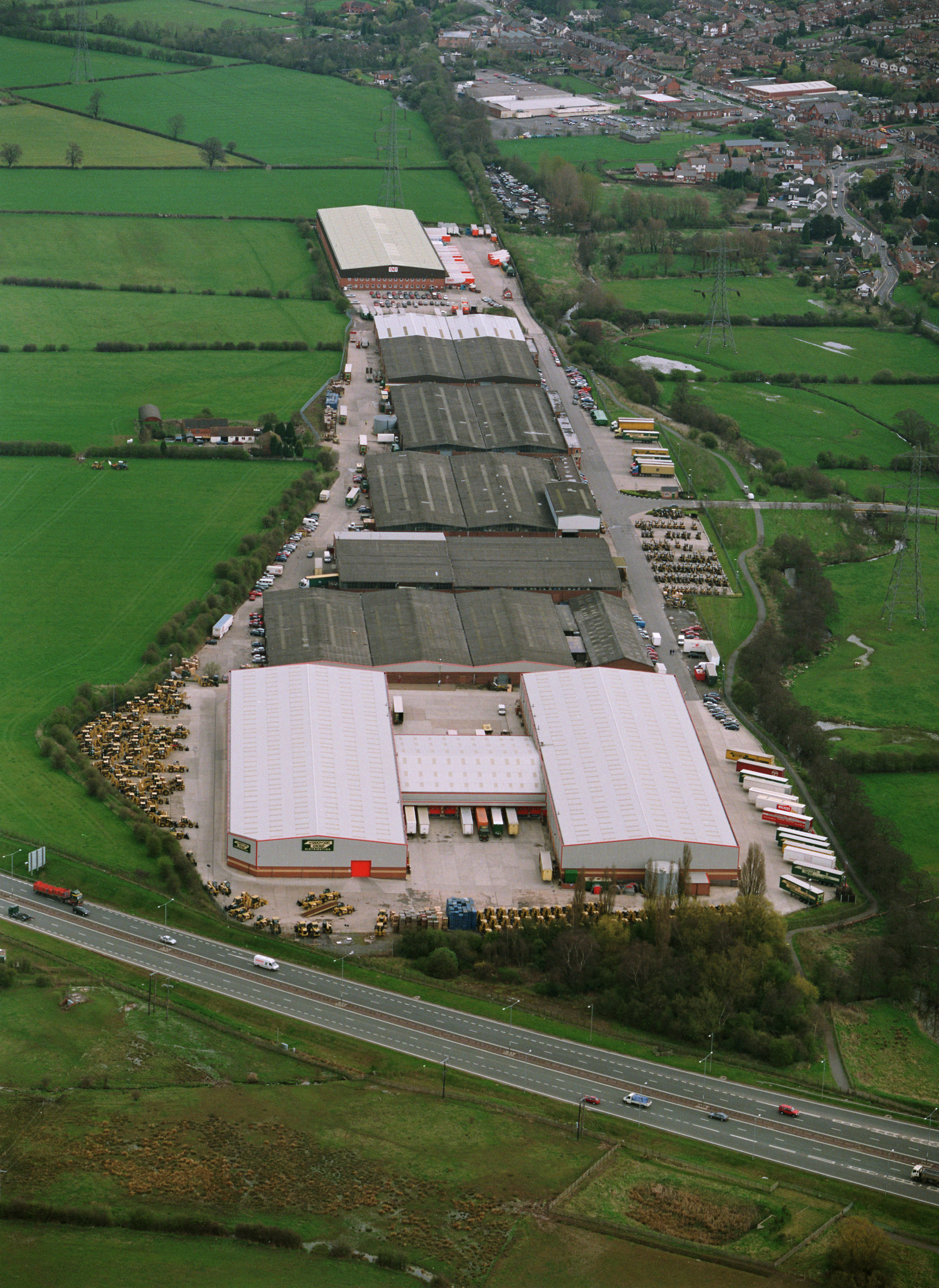
A section of the A46 in Glenfield, Leicestershire just before it joins the M1 motorway

The road crosses the A1. Newark is bypassed to the North and West ending on a roundabout with the B6166. The road continues south-west, meeting the A6097 and A52 near Bingham. The single carriageway section between Newark and the Widmerpool A606 junction was replaced by a new dual carriageway road which was completed in April 2012. Heading South from the A606 junction, the existing dual carriageway still following the route of the Fosse Way. The road crosses the A6006 North of Six Hills. Syston is bypassed to the West, and at a roundabout with the A607 the route continues in a Westerly direction onto the Leicester Western Bypass. There are grade separated junctions with the A6, A5630 and A50. This section of the road ends at a junction with the B5380, with the forward route flowing on to the M1. It originally continued towards Coventry until the opening of the M69 motorway in the 1970s, which replaced the A46 as the main route between Leicester and Coventry, with the former A46 being downgraded.

=== M6 (Coventry) – M5 (Tewkesbury) ===
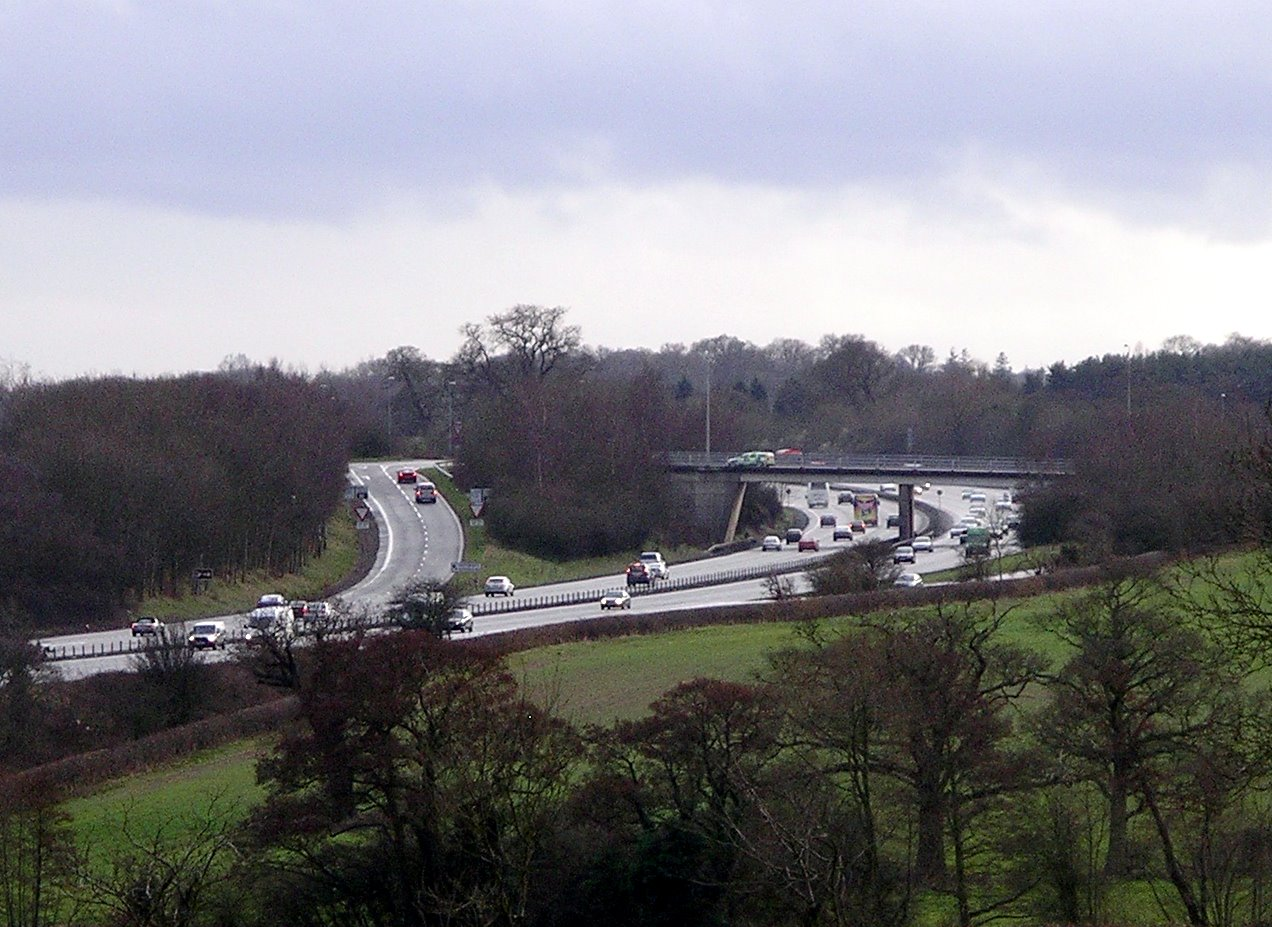
The A46 junction for Stoneleigh and the University of Warwick

The A46 reappears at Coventry at junction 2 of the M6, it follows the boundary between the district of Rugby and the borough of Coventry, always staying inside Warwickshire. At Binley Woods the A428 is crossed at a roundabout. The next roundabout is the signal controlled Tollbar Roundabout, where there are exits for the A45 and Coventry Airport. There is a break in the road here, and it resumes again at Festival Island where it takes the southern exit on to the three-lane Kenilworth bypass. Along the bypass there are exits for Stoneleigh and the University of Warwick, Kenilworth and Leamington Spa (A452). At the Warwick (A429) exit, the bypass drops down to two lanes, closely followed by an exit for the A4177 and Warwick Parkway railway station. The M40 is passed over west of Longbridge roundabout, as a new bypass now brings the mainline carriageway away from Junction 15, the A46 meets a small roundabout, connecting with the B4463 and a link to Junction 15 for northbound A46 traffic to access the M40 and A429 respectively.

The 3-mile (4.8 km) dual carriageway section south of the improved Longbridge island is the only part of the A46 on its original routing between Leicester and Cheltenham. Stratford is bypassed to the north as a single carriageway road, crossing the A3400 and meeting the A422. Between here and Alcester the A46 is coincident with the A422, with the A46 taking priority. Alcester is bypassed to the south of the town. At a roundabout the A435 leaves to the North for Redditch and Birmingham. The A46 takes a dual carriageway route to the south towards Evesham, meeting the B439 at a roundabout near Bidford on Avon. Almost immediately after the roundabout, the road enters Worcestershire and Wychavon district, then goes back into Warwickshire, before going back into Worcestershire Near Harvington. At the northern end of the Evesham bypass, the A44 joins at a roundabout and becomes coincident with the A46. The next roundabout on the bypass is the B4035, followed by the A44 (for Oxford), The final roundabout on the bypass is with the A4184 and the A46 continues to head south. The villages of Sedgeberrow (bypassed) and Beckford are on the route. At the Teddington Hands roundabout, the A435 heads south to Cheltenham, while the A46 heads west. It passes Ashchurch close to Ashchurch for Tewkesbury railway station. This section of the A46 ends on the M5 roundabout at junction 9.

=== Cheltenham – Bath ===
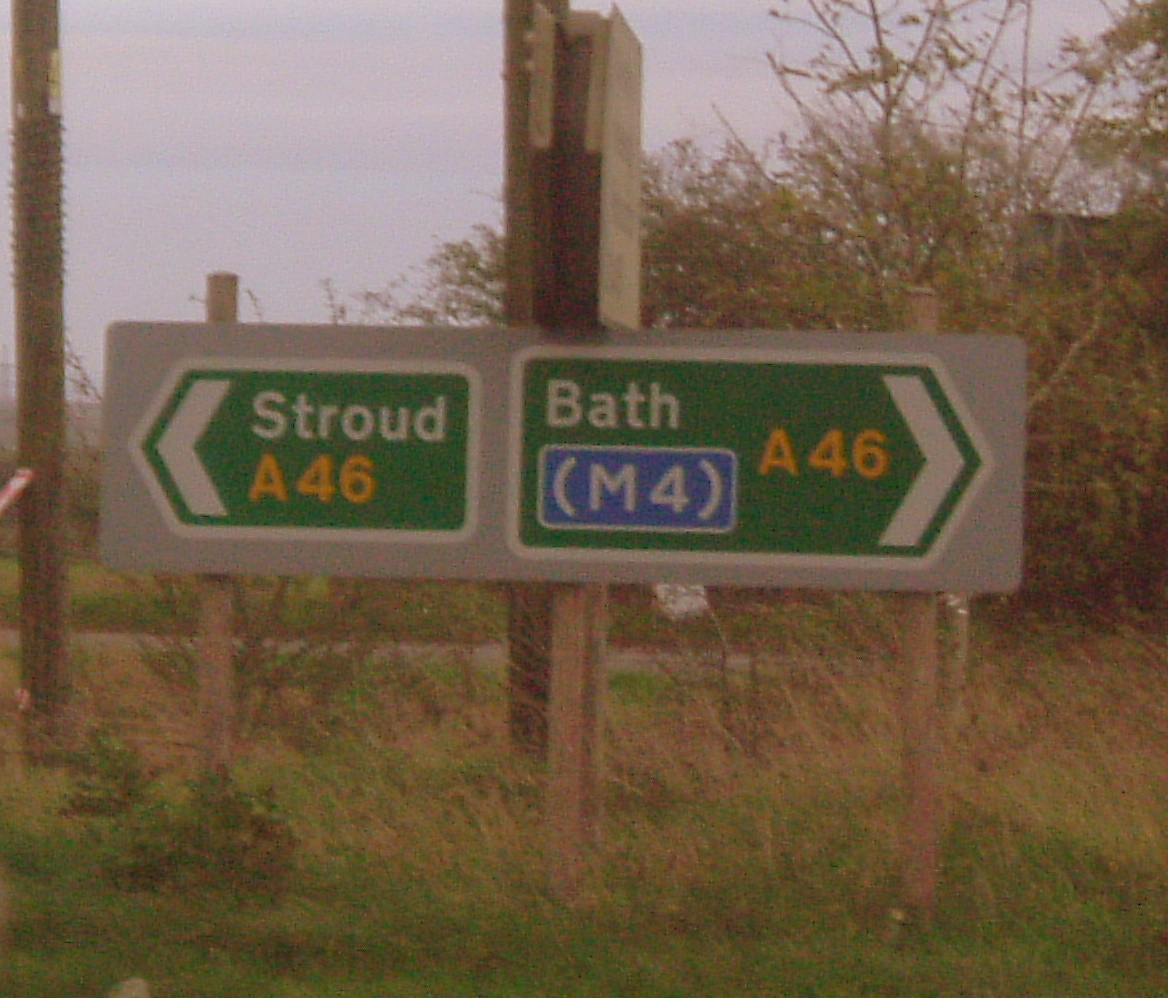
A fingerpost sign along the A46 in South Gloucestershire. Near the junction with the M4

After a gap filled in by the A435, the A46 reappears on its original route in the centre of Cheltenham. It then heads through Brockworth, Stroud, through Nailsworth, to the M4 motorway, where since 2003 access to the roundabout has been controlled by traffic lights. From the M4, the A46 heads to Bath, ending at its junction with the A4 to the east of the city. From here there is a continuous route to Southampton via the A36 and to Poole via the A350.

The 3-mile (4.8 km) £45 million dual-carriageway Batheaston/Swainswick Bypass, opened in summer 1996, contains 1-mile (1.6 km) of the A46. In February 1994, a camp was set up on Solsbury Hill, to protest the Batheaston bypass, however this was ultimately unsuccessful and construction was completed by November 1995.

A small section of the A46 between Painswick and Stroud subsided during the floods on Friday 29 July 2007 and was shut for over 6 months, causing quite an impact on the local area. The road re-opened on 15 February 2008.

== Junction list ==
=== First segment ===
County	Location	mi	km	Destinations	Notes
Somerset	Bath	0.0	0.0	A4 / A36 / A363 – Bath, Chippenham, Warminster, Bradford-on-Avon	Southern terminus
Gloucestershire	Cold Ashton	4.3	6.9	A420 – Bristol, Chippenham, Warmley, Bridgeyate, Wick, Marshfield	
Gloucestershire	Tormarton	7.8– 8.0	12.6– 12.9	M4 to M32 / M5 – Wales, The South West, The Midlands, Bristol, London, Swindon	The Midlands signed northbound only; M4 junction 18
Gloucestershire	Sodbury	9.9	15.9	A432 west (Badminton Road) / B4040 – Chipping Sodbury, Yate, Malmesbury, Old Sodbury, Acton Turville, Badminton, Castle Combe	Castle Combe signed southbound only; eastern terminus of A432
Gloucestershire	Hawkesbury	13.7	22.0	A433 north-east – Cirencester	South-western terminus of A433
Gloucestershire	Kingscote	20.0	32.2	A4135 – Dursley, Tetbury, Kingscote, Wotton-under-Edge, Beverston	
Gloucestershire	Rodborough	26.4	42.5	Dudbridge Road to A419 / M5 – Stonehouse, Cainscross, Dudbridge, Gloucester, Cheltenham	No access from A46 south to Dudbridge Road
Gloucestershire	Stroud	27.2	43.8	A419 south-east (Dr. Newton's Way) – Town centre, Cirencester, Chalford, Brimscombe	Brimscombe signed southbound only; southern terminus of A419 concurrency
Gloucestershire	Stroud	27.2	43.8	A419 north-west / Rowcroft to M5 – Bristol, Cainscross, Ebley, Stonehouse, Gloucester, Cheltenham	Cainscross, Ebley and Stonehouse signed northbound only, Gloucester and Cheltenham southbound only; northern terminus of A419 concurrency
Gloucestershire	Stroud	27.7	44.6	Stratford Road (A4171 west) to A419 / A38 – Dursley, Cainscross, Stonehouse	Stonehouse signed southbound only; eastern terminus of A4171
Gloucestershire	Pitchcombe	29.1	46.8	A4173 north – Edge, Gloucester	Southern terminus of A4173
Gloucestershire	Badgeworth	36.4	58.6	A417 to M5 – Gloucester, Cirencester, Birdlip	Junction on A417
Gloucestershire	Cheltenham	40.4– 40.5	65.0– 65.2	A40 / M5 / A435 / A4019 – Tewkesbury, Gloucester, Oxford, Cirencester, Charlton Kings	
Gloucestershire	Cheltenham	40.8– 42.1	65.7– 67.8	Promenade (A4015 south) to M5 / A40 – Gloucester, Oxford, Stroud A4019 north-west (St Margaret's Road) – Tewkesbury A435 north (Evesham Road) – Evesham, Winchcombe, Broadway A435 south (London Road) to A40 – Cirencester, Oxford	Northern terminus; northern terminus of A4015; eastern terminus of A4019
1.000 mi = 1.609 km; 1.000 km = 0.621 mi

=== Second segment ===
County	Location	mi	km	Destinations	Notes
Gloucestershire	Northway–Ashchurch boundary	0.0	0.0	M5 to M50 – The South West, The Midlands, South Wales, Gloucester, Worcester A438 west (Ashchurch Road) – Tewkesbury	Southern terminus
Gloucestershire	Teddington	3.1	5.0	A435 south / B4077 / Crashmore Lane – Cheltenham, Stow, Teddington, Bishop's Cleeve, Alderton, Toddington, Winchcombe	Northern terminus of A435
Worcestershire	Evesham	9.9	15.9	A4184 north (Cheltenham Road) to B4084 – Evesham, Pershore	To B4084 signed northbound only; southern terminus of A4184
Worcestershire	Evesham	11.4	18.3	A44 east / Broadway Road – Oxford, Evesham, Broadway	Broadway signed southbound only; southern terminus of A44 concurrency
Worcestershire	Evesham	13.7	22.0	A44 west to A4184 – Worcester, Evesham, Norton, Harvington, Lenchwick	To A4184 and Lenchwick signed southbound only, Harvington signed northbound only; northern terminus of A44 concurrency
Warwickshire	Alcester	21.3	34.3	A435 north / A422 west to M42 – The North, Birmingham, Redditch, Worcester, Alcester, Arrow, Studley	The North signed southbound only; southern terminus of A422 concurrency; southern terminus of A435
Warwickshire	Stratford-upon-Avon	26.8	43.1	A422 east (Alcester Road) – Stratford	Stratford signed southbound only; northern terminus of A422 concurrency
Warwickshire	Stratford-upon-Avon	28.1	45.2	A3400 (Birmingham Road) – Henley-in-Arden, Stratford, Wilmcote	
Warwickshire	Snitterfield	32.1	51.7	A439 south-west – Stratford, Hampton Lucy	Destinations signed northbound only; north-eastern terminus of A439
Warwickshire	Shelbourne	33.9	54.6	B4463 / Stratford Road / M40 / A429 – Leamington, Cirencester, Warwick, Henley-in-Arden, Norton Lindsey	Leamington signed northbound only
Warwickshire	Shelbourne	33.9	54.6	Begin freeway	
Warwickshire	Budbrooke–Warwick boundary	34.9	56.2	A429 to M40 south – The South, Banbury, Cirencester, Warwick	Southbound exit and northbound entrance
Warwickshire	Leek Wooton and Guy's Cliffe–Budbrooke–Warwick boundary	36.0– 36.3	57.9– 58.4	A4177 north / A425 south-east – Solihull, Warwick	Southern terminus of A4177; north-western terminus of A425
Warwickshire	Leek Wootton and Guy's Cliffe	38.0– 38.4	61.2– 61.8	A429 south – Warwick, Leek Wottton; B4115 – Leek Wootton, Hill Wootton	B4115 and Hill Wootton signed northbound only, A429 and Warwick southbound only; southern terminus of A429 concurrency
Warwickshire	Leek Wootton and Guy's Cliffe–Ashow boundary	39.6– 40.1	63.7– 64.5	A452 (A429 north) – Leamington, Kenilworth	Northern terminus of A429 concurrency
Warwickshire	Stoneleigh	42.0– 42.4	67.6– 68.2	Stoneleigh	
Warwickshire–West Midlands boundary	Baginton–Coventry boundary	43.8– 44.5	70.5– 71.6	A45 west to M42 – Birmingham, Coventry (S & W), Canley, Earlsdon, Finham, Baginton A444 north to A4114 – Coventry, Whitley	Canley, Earlsdon and Baginton signed northbound only, Whitley southbound only; southern terminus of A45 concurrency; southern terminus of A444
West Midlands	Coventry	44.7– 45.0	71.9– 72.4	Coventry Airport	Grade-separated junction; no northbound exit
West Midlands–Warwickshire boundary	Coventry–Brandon and Bretford boundary	45.2– 45.9	72.7– 73.9	A45 east / B4110 to M45 / M1 south / A4071 – Rugby, Coventry Airport, Willenhall, Baginton, Ryton	Grade–separated junction; B4110 and Willenhall signed northbound only, Baginton and Ryton southbound only; northern terminus of A45 concurrency
Warwickshire	Binley Woods	47.3– 47.8	76.1– 76.9	A428 – Rugby, Coventry (E & C)	Grade–separated junction
Warwickshire	Ansty	50.0– 50.7	80.5– 81.6	M69 north-east to M1 – Hinckley, Leicester, The North East; M6 to M1 / A14 – The North West, Birmingham, London, Kettering, Rugby A4600 south-west / B4065 (Hinckley Road) – Walsgrave, Ansty	Northern terminus; south-western terminus of M69; north-eastern terminus of A4600; M6 junction 2
1.000 mi = 1.609 km; 1.000 km = 0.621 mi: Concurrency terminus; Incomplete access

=== Third segment ===
County	Location	mi	km	Destinations	Notes
Leicestershire	Kirby Muxloe–Glenfield boundary	0.0	0.0	M1 south to M69 – London; B5380 – Braunstone Firth, Kirby Muxloe	Southern terminus; M1 north junction 21A
Leicestershire	Groby	1.1– 1.5	1.8– 2.4	A50 to M1 north – Leicester, Coalville, Groby, Glenfield	The Brantings Roundabout
Leicestershire	Anstey	1.9– 2.5	3.1– 4.0	A5630 south-east – Beaumont Leys, Anstey	North-western terminus of A5630
Leicestershire	Wanlip	5.3– 5.7	8.5– 9.2	A6 – Leicester, Loughborough, Wanlip, Birstall, Rothley	Wanlip signed northbound only, Birstall and Rothley southbound only
Leicestershire	Wanlip	6.0	9.7	Wanlip	Southbound exit and northbound entrance
Leicestershire	Syston	6.8	10.9	A607 south / Martin Drive – Leicester, Thurmaston, Syston	Roundabout; southern terminus of A607 concurrency
Leicestershire	Cossington–Ratcliffe on the Wreake boundary	7.7– 8.4	12.4– 13.5	A607 north – Melton Mowbray, Cossington, East Goscote	Northern terminus of A607 concurrency
Leicestershire	Ratcliffe on the Wreake	8.6– 8.9	13.8– 14.3	Ratcliffe on the Wreake, Sileby	
Leicestershire	Thrussington–Burton on the Wolds boundary	12.9– 13.1	20.8– 21.1	B676 – Burton on the Wolds, Ragdale, Barrow upon Soar, Seagrave, Loughborough, Melton Mowbray	Loughboro' and Melton signed northbound only, Barrow and Seagrave southbound only
Leicestershire	Broughton and Old Dalby–Wymeswold boundary	14.0– 14.3	22.5– 23.0	A6006 – East Midlands Airport, Rempstone, Melton Mowbray, Wymeswold, Asfordby	Airport signed northbound only
Nottinghamshire	Willoughby on the Wolds–Upper Broughton boundary	15.8	25.4	Upper Broughton, Willoughby	
Nottinghamshire	Widmerpool–Hickling–Kinoulton boundary	17.8– 18.4	28.6– 29.6	A606 – Nottingham, Melton Mowbray, Kinoulton	Kinoulton signed northbound only
Nottinghamshire	Stanton-on-the-Wolds–Kinoulton boundary	19.0	30.6	Kinoulton	
Nottinghamshire	Owthorpe–Cotgrave boundary	21.2	34.1	Harby, Colston Bassett, Cotgrave, Owthorpe	Cotgrave signed northbound only
Nottinghamshire	Cotgrave	22.3– 23.0	35.9– 37.0	Cropwell Bishop, Cropwell Butler, Cotgrave	Butler signed northbound only, Cotgrave southbound only
Nottinghamshire	Cropwell Butler–Saxondale boundary	24.7– 25.5	39.8– 41.0	A52 to M1 north / A1 – The South, Grantham, Nottingham, East Midlands Airport	
Nottinghamshire	Newton–East Bridgford boundary	26.3– 27.0	42.3– 43.5	A6097 north – Mansfield, East Bridgford, Bingham	No southbound exit; southern terminus of A6097
Nottinghamshire	East Bridgford	28.1	45.2	To A6097 north – Mansfield, East Bridgford, Bingham	Southbound exit only
Nottinghamshire	Kneeton–Screveton boundary	29.2– 29.4	47.0– 47.3	Kneeton	
Nottinghamshire	Flintham	30.8– 30.9	49.6– 49.7	Sibthorpe, Flintham, Syerston	Syerston signed northbound only
Nottinghamshire	Elston	32.1	51.7	Thorpe, East Stoke, Elston, Syerston	Syerston signed southbound only
Nottinghamshire	Farndon	35.2	56.6	End expressway	
Nottinghamshire	Newark-on-Trent	37.0	59.5	A617 west (Kelham Road) / A616 north-west (Great North Road) / B6326 to A612 – Mansfield, Ollerton, Newark, Kelham, Southwell	Eastern terminus of A617; south-eastern terminus of A616
Nottinghamshire	Newark–Winthorpe boundary	38.7– 39.0	62.3– 62.8	A1 to A57 – Doncaster, Sheffield, Grantham; A17 east – Sleaford, Nottinghamshire	Coddington signed northbound only; western terminus of A17
Nottinghamshire	Winthorpe–Langford boundary	39.7	63.9	A1133 north – Gainsborough, Collingham, Winthorpe	Collingham and Winthorpe signed northbound only; southern terminus of A1133
Nottinghamshire	Brough	40.4– 41.8	65.0– 67.3	Stapleford, Brough, Carlton-le-Moorland, Norton Disney	Grade-separated junction; Norton Disney signed northbound only
Lincolnshire	Thorpe on the Hill–Aubourn with Haddington boundary	46.9	75.5	Aubourn, Haddington, Thorpe on the Hill	Grade-separated junction
Lincolnshire	Thorpe on the Hill–South Hykeham boundary	47.8	76.9	A1434 north-east (Newark Road) / Middle Lane – Lincoln South, Thorpe on the Hill, North Hykeham, South Hykeham	Thorpe signed northbound only; south-western terminus of A1434
Lincolnshire	Lincoln	53.3	85.8	A57 (Saxilby Road) to A156 – Worksop, Gainsborough, Lincoln Central, Burton, Saxilby	
Lincolnshire	Lincoln	55.0	88.5	A15 north / B1226 (Riseholme Road) to M180 / A18 – Humber Bridge, Scunthorpe, Immingham, Lincoln (Ermine), Hull	B1226, To A18, and Hull signed southbound only; southern terminus of A15 concurrency
Lincolnshire	Lincoln	56.1	90.3	A15 south / Lincoln Road to A158 – Skegness, Sleaford, Lincoln	Northern terminus of A15 concurrency
Lincolnshire	Middle Rasen	68.1	109.6	A631 west (Gainsborough Road) – Gainsborough, West Rasen, Glentham, Caenby Corner, Scunthorpe	West Rasen, Glentham and Caenby Corner signed northbound only, Scunthorpe southbound only; southern terminus of A631 concurrency
Lincolnshire	Middle Rasen	68.9	110.9	A631 east to B1202 (Gainsborough Road) – Market Rasen, Louth, Wragby	Louth signed northbound only, To B1202 and Wragby southbound only; northern terminus of A631 concurrency
Lincolnshire	Osgodby	71.3	114.7	A1103 west (Top Road) to Gipsy Lane / A631 – Gainsborough, Glentham, Walesby, Caenby Corner	Eastern terminus of A1103
Lincolnshire	Caistor–Cabourne boundary	78.2	125.9	A1173 north (Riby Road) to A1084 – Immingham, Brigg, Humber Bridge, Caistor, Great Limber, Kirmington, Stallingborough	Humber Bridge signed northbound only, Caistor southbound only; southern terminus of A1173
Lincolnshire	Laceby	84.1	135.3	A18 (Barton Street) to M180 / A15 / A16 – Humber Bridge, Boston, Skegness, Brigg, Humberside Airport, Louth, Waltham, Barnoldby	
Lincolnshire	Grimsby	88.1	141.8	A1243 south (Scartho Road) to A16 – Louth, Skegness, Boston, Waltham	A1243 signed southbound only; southern terminus of A1243 concurrency
Lincolnshire	Grimsby	88.3	142.1	A1243 north (Bargate) to M180 / A180 – Town centre, Immingham, Humber Bridge	Only A1243 and Town centre signed northbound; northern terminus of A1243 concurrency
Lincolnshire	Grimsby	88.9	143.1	A16 (Peaks Parkway) to M180 / A180 – Humber Bridge, Immingham, Boston, Skegness, Louth, Town centre	To A180 and town centre signed southbound only
Lincolnshire	Grimsby–Cleethorpes boundary	89.8	144.5	A1031 south (Humberston Road) – Humberston, Mablethorpe	Mablethorpe signed southbound only; northern terminus of A1031
Lincolnshire	Cleethorpes	90.7	146.0	A180 west (Grimsby Road) / A1098 south (Isaac's Hill) / Prince's Road to M180 / A15 – Town centre, Humber Bridge, Grimsby	Northern terminus; eastern terminus of A180; northern terminus of A1098
1.000 mi = 1.609 km; 1.000 km = 0.621 mi: Concurrency terminus; Incomplete access

== Former routes ==
=== Bypasses and realignments ===
- Irby upon Humber (Bypassed, now Old Main Road)
- Swallow (Bypassed, now Caistor-Grimsby Road)
- Lincoln (Bypassed, now A1434)
- Newark (Bypassed, now B6166)
- Syston (Bypassed, now unclassified)
- Leicester (Bypassed, now A607 and A5460)
- Coventry (Bypassed; northern section A4600; southern section now A429 [pre-1974 route],
  or A444 and A4114 [1974 — 1989 route])
- Kenilworth and Warwick (Bypassed, now A429)
- Stratford (Bypassed, now A439 and B439)

=== Downgrading ===
- Leicester – Coventry (Downgraded to B4114 upon opening of the M69)
- Stratford – Cheltenham (Downgraded to B4632 upon diversion of route via Alcester and Evesham)

== Improvements ==
- The M40 Longbridge Island bypass, a dual carriageway road which bypassed the M40 Junction 15 interchange, opened in December 2009, providing much needed relief for the junction.
- The Newark to Widmerpool Improvement is now complete and provides a new high quality grade-separated dual-carriageway which closes the gap in the corridor. Spring 2012 saw peripheral works progress and the entire project was completed by Summer 2012.
- The A45/A46 Tollbar End improvement is now complete and provides a grade separated junction, as well as improvements to the Stonebridge Highway. The project was open to traffic in December 2016.
- The A46/A428 Binley Junction Upgrade will provided a grade separated junction.
- The junction with Lincoln Road near Welton was replaced with a three-armed roundabout, primarily to reduce its high accident rate. Work was completed in June 2021.

=== Proposed ===
- The Sub-national Transport Body Midlands Connect prioritised the upgrading of the A46 in the Midlands Connect Strategy, published in March 2017, including a strategic study for a potential expressway route between the M5 and M40. In July 2018, Midlands Connect released "Our Routes to Growth" in which it described the first stage of its A46 corridor study, referring to the road as a "national and international economic driver that connects the East and West Midlands to the South West and the North. Investing in infrastructure improvements along this route will create a resilient alternative to the existing motorway network for businesses and freight traffic." It reiterated the development a business case for upgrades to the A46 from the M40 to Syston and a strategic study for making the A46 an expressway between the M5 and M40. The first stage of this A46 study will be released before the end of 2018, with the second stage examining specific sections for more detailed development of possible improvements.

=== Upcoming ===
- Newark Bypass – will upgrade road to dual carriageway. Scheme expected to be completed by 2030.
