= Spital-in-the-Street =

Small hamlet in the West Lindsey district of Lincolnshire, England

Coordinates: 53.405044°N 0.548377°W

Spital in the Street
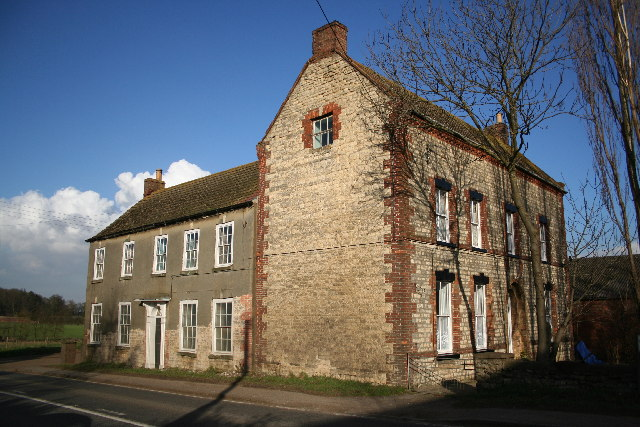
- Cromwell House and the former Ostrich Inn

- Location within Lincolnshire
- OS grid reference: SK966907
  - London: 140 mi (230 km) S
- Civil parish: Glentham, Hemswell Cliff
- District: West Lindsey
- Shire county: Lincolnshire
- Region: East Midlands
- Country: England
- Sovereign state: United Kingdom
- Post town: MARKET RASEN
- Postcode district: LN8
- Police: Lincolnshire
- Fire: Lincolnshire
- Ambulance: East Midlands
- UK Parliament: Gainsborough

Spital-in-the-Street is a small hamlet in the West Lindsey district of Lincolnshire, England. It is situated on the A15 road (Roman Ermine Street), 12 miles (19 km) north from Lincoln, 9 miles (14 km) east from Gainsborough, and 1 mile (1.6 km) north from the A15 and A631 crossroad at Caenby Corner. Nearby villages include Hemswell to the west, Glentham to the east, and Glentworth to the south-west.

The A15 road here forms a parish boundary, so the hamlet is divided between the civil parish of Hemswell Cliff (west of the A15) and the civil parish of Glentham to the east. Before Hemswell Cliff parish was formed in 1991, the western part of the hamlet was in Hemswell parish.

== History ==
Spital-in-the-Street lies on Ermine Street, a Roman road that runs in a straight line for 32 miles (51 km) between Lincoln and the Humber Estuary, passing through no villages north from Lincoln until Broughton 25 miles (40 km) away. The first part of its name, "Spital", comes from the ancient hospital for the poor which was situated here, having its origins in a Hermitage. Hermits, or 'Eremites' dwellers in the eremos or wilderness, sometimes placed their Hermitages in remote spots, often on highways, to extend hospitality to travellers.

The chapel attached to the hermitage was dedicated to St Edmund. Edward II granted a licence for land and rent to be appropriated by the Vicar of Tealby for the payment of the Chaplain; and by a document signed at Tealby in 1323 and witnessed by nearly all the dignitaries of Lincoln Cathedral the foundation was placed under the jurisdiction of the Dean and Chapter. Ten years later the hermitage was called “Spital-on-the-Street” so its use had probably already been enlarged, although there is no documentary evidence of this. All that is known is the building of a house for the Chaplain by John of Harrington in 1333.

In 1396 Richard II granted to Thomas de Aston, Canon of Lincoln, leave to build a house "adjoining the west side of the chapel for the residence of William Wyhom the Chaplain and of certain poor persons there resident and their successors", and before the end of the 14th century it had buildings sufficient for these poor persons. It escaped Henry VIII’s dissolution of the monasteries only to be later seized by Elizabeth I for the Crown and sold.

The Sessions for the Kirton division of Lindsey were for many years held in the chapel, but it fell into disrepair and was pulled down by Sir William Wray in 1594 with a new Session's House built nearby. In 1660 Robert Mapletoft of Pembroke College, Cambridge was appointed Sub-Dean of Lincoln Cathedral and also Master of the Spital Hospital; he rebuilt the chapel in 1661 and set about improving the hospital's revenues. By the mid-19th century, the Charity Commissioners estimated the hospital's revenues to be £959 per year, although they said that most of this was being misappropriated. This money, a considerable amount, was eventually recovered and used to endow De Aston School in Market Rasen, to restore Lincoln Grammar School and pay the alms of four neighbouring parishes.

The chapel was restored in 1864 but by the end of the 19th century the hospital had been abandoned and only the chapel remained, falling ever further into dereliction until being restored once again in the 1990s.
