= RAF Hemswell =

Former RAF station in Lincolnshire, England

RAF Hemswell
- Hemswell Cliff, Lincolnshire in England
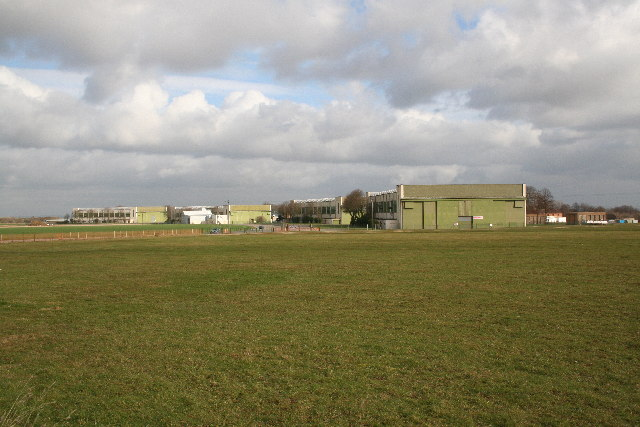
- Hangars and buildings still standing at Hemswell

Site information
- Type: Royal Air Force station
- Code: HL
- Owner: Ministry of Defence
- Operator: Royal Flying Corps; Royal Air Force; United States Air Force
- Controlled by: RAF Bomber Command * No. 1 Group RAF * No. 5 Group RAF

Location
- Shown within Lincolnshire RAF Hemswell (the United Kingdom)
- Coordinates: 53°23′56″N 000°34′26″W
- Grid reference: SK940910

Site history
- Built: 1918 & 1935
- In use: 1918 - 1919; 1936 - 1967
- Battles/wars: European theatre of World War II; Cold War

Airfield information
- Elevation: 55 metres (180 ft) AMSL
Runways
Direction	Length and surface
00/00	Concrete/Tarmac
00/00	Concrete/Tarmac
00/00	Concrete/Tarmac
- Decommissioned and closed in 1967; Military Bomber airfield and a later Ballistic Missile base

Royal Air Force Hemswell, or RAF Hemswell, is a former Royal Air Force station located 7.8 miles (12.6 km) east of Gainsborough, Lincolnshire, England.

Located close to the village of Hemswell in Lincolnshire, England the disestablished airfield is now in full use as a civilian industrial and retail trading estate, forming part of the newly created parish of Hemswell Cliff along with the station's married quarters and RAF-built primary school that are now in non-military ownership.

The airfield was used by RAF Bomber Command for 20 years between 1937 and 1957 and saw most of its operational life during the Second World War. It was used again by Bomber Command as a nuclear ballistic missile base during the Cold War and then closed to military use in 1967.

On 19 March 1940 RAF Hemswell-based Handley Page Hampdens of No. 61 Squadron RAF were the first Bomber Command aircraft to drop bombs on German soil during the Second World War. The target was the Hörnum seaplane base on the northern Germany coast.

RAF Hemswell was used as a substitute for RAF Scampton in most of the ground-based filming of the 1954 war film The Dam Busters

== First World War ==
The first airfield on the site was opened in 1918 by the Royal Flying Corps and called RFCS Harpswell after the village of that name just across the A631 road.

During the First World War it was used as a night landing ground and two night flying training squadrons were established there. In June 1919 the grass airfield was returned to its former use as farmland.

== Second World War ==
In 1935 construction began on compulsory repurchased land. The new bomber airfield, now called RAF Hemswell, was opened on New Year's Eve 31 December 1936 to accommodate the rapidly expanding Bomber Command. The station was home for Hawker Hind, Hawker Audax, Avro Anson, Bristol Blenheim and Boulton Paul Overstrand aircraft in its early days.

On 19 March 1940 RAF Hemswell-based Handley Page Hampdens of No. 61 Squadron RAF were the first Bomber Command aircraft to drop bombs on German soil during the Second World War. The target was the Hörnum seaplane base on the northern Germany coast.

The station and its squadrons (61 and 144) initially formed part of No. 5 (Bomber) Group RAF with its group headquarters at St Vincents House, St Vincents Road, Grantham, transferring to No. 1 Bomber Group RAF at RAF Hucknall, Nottinghamshire in June 1941.

During the war years various squadrons were posted to Hemswell, including many Polish personnel flying Vickers Wellingtons. During the war a total of 122 bomber aircraft and their crews were lost on operations from Hemswell, including 38 Handley Page Hampdens, 62 Vickers Wellingtons and 22 Avro Lancasters.

The Irish actress, Beatrice Campbell's first husband, Squadron Leader Michael Robert MacClancy, of No. 226 Squadron RAF, died aged 22, on 12 April 1942 at RAF Hemswell, when his aircraft crash landed. She subsequently married Nigel Patrick.

Hemswell operated as a dual site with a nearby overflow airfield at RAF Ingham. RAF Ingham was a grassed field landing ground with few buildings or facilities. Between 1941 and 1943 the Polish bomber squadrons (No. 305 Polish Bomber Squadron, No. 301 Polish Bomber Squadron and No. 300 Polish Bomber Squadron) used the airfield for their Wellington operations. The squadrons used Ingham while training and also flew operations from there whilst the runways were being laid at Hemswell in anticipation of the arrival of the heavier Avro Lancaster. Ingham was later renamed RAF Cammeringham and became a full station in its own right, closing for aircraft use in 1945 when the grass runways became unstable and taking on a ground training role. Cliffe House, that had been commandeered as the officers' mess and a number of pre-fabricated buildings, quonset huts and the brick built control tower still stand at the abandoned airfield.

With the arrival of the Avro Lancaster, Hemswell took on a training role, becoming the home to No. 1 Lancaster Finishing School. This school was tasked with giving Lancaster experience to aircrews who had just finished their training at a Heavy Conversion Unit prior to posting to an operational squadron. During 1944, as Lancasters were then being used at Heavy Conversion Units, the Lancaster Finishing Schools were disbanded and Hemswell again took on an operational role. No. 150 and 170 squadrons took up residence and commenced flying bomber operations until the end of the war. The film "Night Bombers" was shot at Hemswell during this period.

== Cold War ==
The almost unchanged wartime line of aircraft hangars, photographed in 2006

After the war a variety of aircraft were stationed at Hemswell including de Havilland Mosquitos, Avro Lancasters and Avro Lincolns, English Electric Canberras with various peacetime roles undertaken including ex-prisoner-of-war repatriation, the dropping of food supplies during the relief of Holland and the Berlin Blockade, goodwill visits to foreign countries, electronic counter measures and nuclear air sampling over hydrogen bomb test sites in the Pacific and Australia.

Hemswell continued in operational flying use by RAF Bomber Command until as late as 1956. The last flying squadrons had departed in January of that year but RAF Hemswell was then established as a Bomber Command missile unit, maintaining and operating three nuclear-armed PGM-17 Thor intermediate-range ballistic missile launchers of No 97 (Strategic Missile) Squadron RAF that remained at Hemswell from December 1959 to May 1963.

Each missile was tipped with a one-megaton nuclear warhead, jointly controlled by the Royal Air Force and the United States Air Force under the so-called dual-key arrangements. RAF Hemswell was also the headquarters for the No. 5 (Lincolnshire) Missile Dispersal Sites located at RAF Bardney, RAF Caistor, RAF Coleby Grange and RAF Ludford Magna. The Cuban Missile Crisis brought the entire UK based Thor missile force to maximum strategic alert and readiness for a ten-day period during October and November 1962.

In 1964 the station was designated and prepared as an operational conversion unit for the expected deployment of the planned TSR-2 (Tactical Strike and Reconnaissance) aircraft. But when the TSR-2 programme was cancelled by the Labour Government of Harold Wilson in 1965, RAF Hemswell had a brief existence as a sub site of 7 School of Recruit Training whose headquarters were at RAF Swinderby. Recruit training continued from Hemswell but the station was eventually placed on "Care and Maintenance" in 1967, when it was decided that all future recruit training would be carried out at RAF Swinderby.

During 1967 the gliders of No. 643 Gliding School RAF Air Training Corps (ATC) moved in from RAF Kirton in Lindsey. No. 643 GS operated from Hemswell until 1974, giving ATC cadets air experience and glider pilot training until moving to RAF Lindholme on 1 April 1974.

This event marked the last RAF use of the airfield which closed and was largely sold with the runways being broken up and used as hardcore for the extension of the A180 road. For several years the buildings were occupied by Ugandan nationals expelled from their country by Idi Amin. The entire technical site and domestic blocks including estates of post war married quarters were purchased by Roger Byron-Collins of Welbeck Estate Group from the Ministry of Defence in the mid-1980s. Nearby the Group had previously purchased 127 NCO married quarter site at nearby RAF Faldingworth in 1981 and the nearby Bomber Command HQ at RAF Bawtry. Also acquired closeby were 110 post war NCO Married quarters at RAF Scampton. Welbeck Estate Group disposed of several of the buildings at RAF Hemswell to different buyers by private treaty. Those buildings that remained including several barrack blocks, the Sergeant's mess, Officers mess, station cinema, water tower, SHQ and guardroom etc were eventually sold by their agents, Earl and Lawrence of Lincoln by public auction which was held in one of the Mess buildings. Throughout the years of operation, RAF Hemswell's mascot and motto were a large weasel rearing-up on its hind legs ready to strike and the words "Bold and Tenacious" emblazoned over (or under) it.

== In popular culture ==
Hemswell was used as a substitute for RAF Scampton in the ground-based filming of the 1954 film The Dam Busters as the wartime layout of both Scampton and Hemswell was similar in many places. The film "Night Bombers" remains the best known filmed record of what RAF Hemswell looked like during and just after the war, which is a colour film of Avro Lancasers at Hemswell in preparation for a raid over Germany which shows briefings, loading of bombs and the raid itself and was the only known colour film of Lancasters at war. Scenes for The Dam Busters film were filmed in various offices of the station headquarters; the front entrance, the bedrooms, ante room and dining room of the officers' mess; hangars and the NAAFI canteen with the latter used for the squadron briefing theatre scenes, as well as on the roadways within the base. The similarities between Scampton and Hemswell continue to cause confusion. It has been said that, at the end of the film actor Richard Todd can be seen walking up the main driveway at Hemswell past Gibson House in the direction of the hangar line; this scene was in fact shot at Scampton.

At the time of filming RAF Hemswell operated Avro Lincolns, very similar in design to the Lancaster. Several of these aircraft appeared in background shots during filming, doubling for additional No. 617 Squadron Lancasters, as the filmmakers only had three airworthy and fully-flying Lancasters available to them.

== Squadrons and units located at RAF Hemswell ==
Date of arrival	Unit	Notes
1916	Several RFC Squadrons	Hemswell used as a night landing ground
April 1918	No. 99 (Depot Training) Squadron RFC	Renumbered from No 199 Sqn before arriving at Hemswell from Rochford it was tasked with the training of night bomber pilots destined for service in France. Disbanded on 13 June 1919.
1918	No. 200 (Depot Training) Squadron RFC	Tasked with the training of night bomber pilots destined for service in France. Disbanded on 13 June 1919.
1935–1937		Building programme constructed station buildings, hangars and married quarter housing
February 1937	No. 144 Squadron RAF	Operating Avro Anson and Hawker Audax and later new Bristol Blenheims and Handley Page Hampdens. Mainly involved in maritime bombing raids on shipping. The squadron left Hemswell in July 1941 and moved to RAF North Luffenham.
March 1937	No. 61 Squadron RAF	61 Sqn's Hemswell-based Handley Page Hampdens were the first Bomber Command aircraft to drop bombs on German soil during the Second World War, on 19 March 1940. The target was the Hörnum seaplane base. Re-equipped with Avro Manchesters the squadron left Hemswell in October 1941 and relocated to RAF North Luffenham.
June 1941	No. 305 Polish Bomber Squadron	Operating Vickers Wellingtons. Left Hemswell / Ingham in August 1943 and relocated to RAF Swanton Morley.
June 1941	No. 301 Polish Bomber Squadron	Operating Vickers Wellingtons. Squadron disbanded in April 1943 after major crew losses could not be restaffed.
July 1942	No. 300 Polish Bomber Squadron	Operating Vickers Wellingtons. Left Hemswell / Ingham in March 1944 and relocated at RAF Faldingworth.
February 1943	No. 199 Squadron RAF	Operating Vickers Wellington. Training for maritime mine laying operations. Left Hemswell in July 1943 and relocated to RAF Lakenheath.
July 1943		Concrete runways laid
Autumn 1943	No. 1 Lancaster Finishing School RAF	Operating Avro Lancasters. School disbanded at Hemswell in November 1944
1944	No. 150 (Bomber) Squadron RAF equipped with the Avro Lancaster	No 1 Group RAF. The squadron was disbanded in November 1945.
November 1944	No. 170 Squadron RAF	Operating Avro Lancasters. The squadron was disbanded in 1945
March 1945	No. 1687 Bomber (Defence) Training) Flight RAF	No. 1687 Flight also maintained a Q decoy site on the far side of nearby Caenby village.
July 1946	No. 83 Squadron RAF	Operating Avro Lincolns. Disbanded at Hemswell in January 1956. Reformed at RAF Waddington in 1957, flying Avro Vulcans.
1946 and 1950	No. 109 Squadron RAF	Operating de Havilland Mosquitos in a Pathfinder and Oboe role. Left Hemswell in 1946. Returned 1950 operating Mosquitoes until 1952, then the English Electric Canberra until departure in January 1956.
1946 and 1950	No. 139 Squadron RAF	Operating de Havilland Mosquitos. Left Hemswell in 1946. Returned 1950 operating Mosquitoes until 1953, then used Canberras and departed in January 1956.
October 1946	No. 97 Squadron RAF	Operating Avro Lancasters and later Avro Lincolns. The Squadron was disbanded in December 1955
1946	No. 100 Squadron RAF	Operating Avro Lancasters and later Avro Lincolns. Left Hemswell in 1950, relocating to Malaysia for Operation Firedog.
April 1952	No. 199 Squadron RAF	Operating at various times Avro Lincolns, de Havilland Mosquitos, English Electric Canberras. Left Hemswell in September 1957, bringing to an end Bomber Command flights from Hemswell. The squadron disbanded in 1958.
December 1959	No. 97 (Strategic Missile) Squadron RAF and 99th Munitions Maintenance Squadron (USAF)	Operating Thor IRBM missiles for RAF Bomber Command. Left Hemswell in May 1963 and its missiles were returned to America where they were used as launch vehicles in the early development of the space programme. No. 97 Sqn disbanded, with the personnel transferred to RAF Watton to join No. 151 Squadron RAF.
1963	No.2 Wing of 7 School of Recruit Training RAF	Used for follow on training for senior recruits from the Recruit Training School at nearby RAF Swinderby. Closed in December 1967
1967 Station on Care and Maintenance. Parented by RAF Scampton	643 Gliding School Air Training Corps,	Cadet Mk 3, Sedbergh and Prefect winch launched gliders. Moved to Lindholme 1 April 1974
RAF Hemswell finally Closed 1 April 1974

== After closure ==
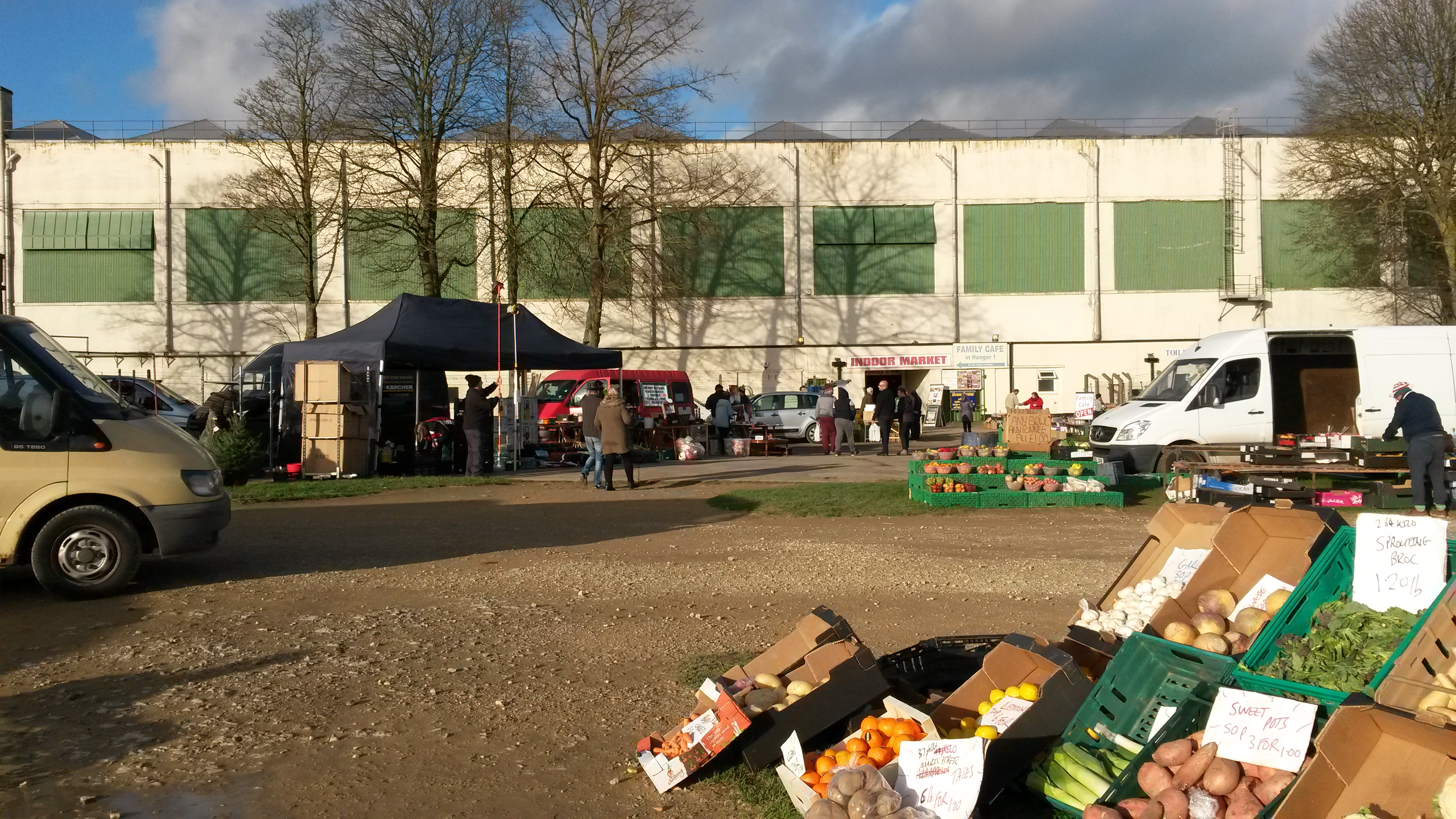
Aircraft hangar at RAF Hemswell during a Sunday market in December 2015

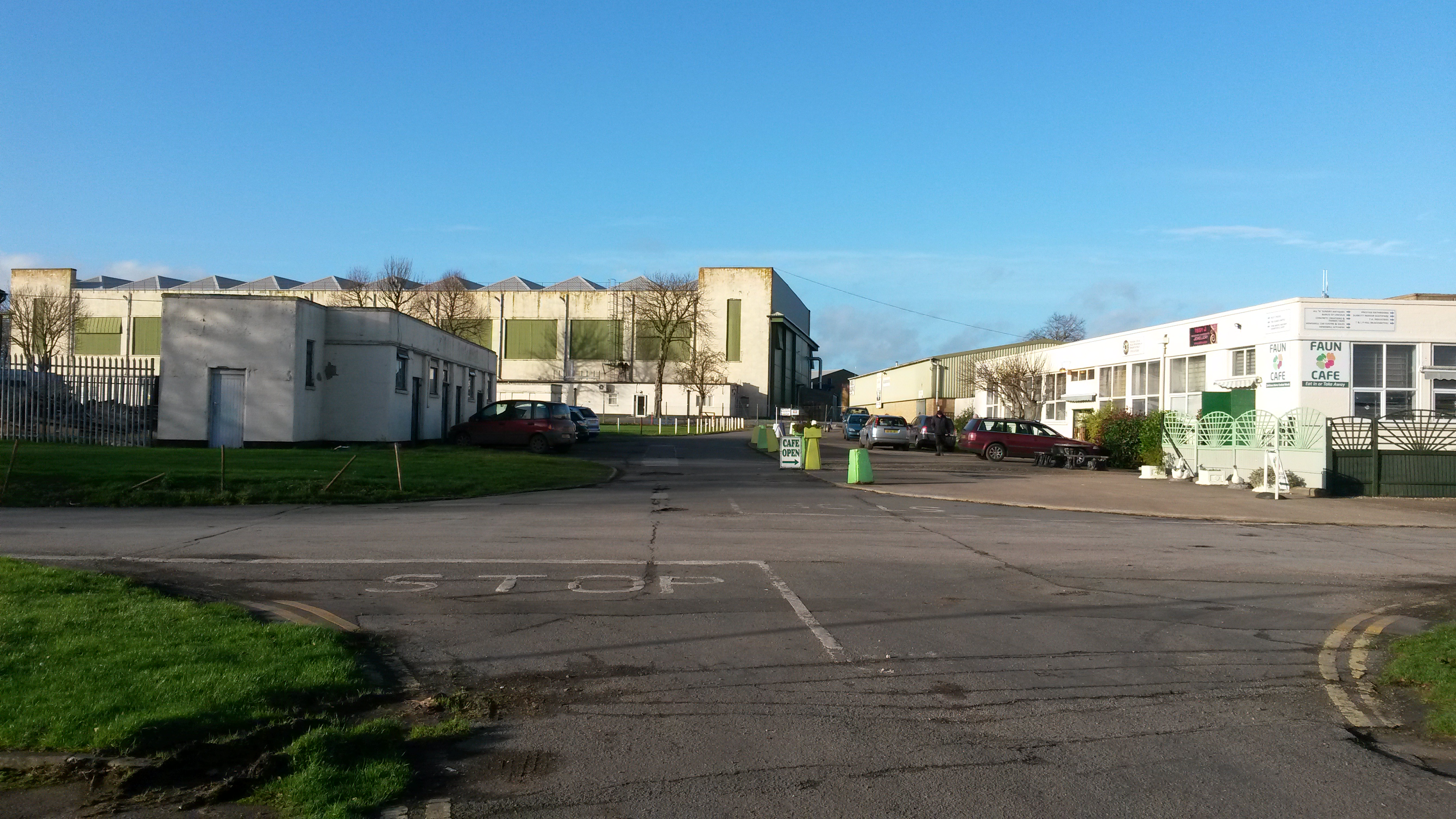
Aircraft hangar and buildings at RAF Hemswell during a Sunday market in December 2015

In 1972 the station became the temporary Hemswell Resettlement Camp when it received Ugandan-Asian refugees expelled from Uganda by president Idi Amin. On 5 June 1985 at RAF Hemswell the entire technical site and domestic blocks including a few estates of post war NCO married quarter houses were purchased by Roger Byron-Collins' Welbeck Estate Group company First State Holdings from the Ministry of Defence. They specialise in renovating and not demolishing any ex-military buildings resulting in the disposal of several of the buildings to different buyers over the years by private treaty. Those buildings that remained including several barrack blocks, the Sergeant's mess, Officers mess, station cinema, water tower, SHQ and guardroom which were eventually sold by the agents, Earl and Lawrence of Lincoln by public auction which was held in one of the Mess buildings. For over 40 years the Welbeck Estate Group have specialised in the purchase of entire MOD sites, either married quarter housing estates or airfields and those also in Lincolnshire at RAF Scampton. Bawtry Hall, Cranwell, Faldingworth, Manby and North Coates. The site was eventually redeveloped into a private trading estate and residential area with the former estates of officers' and other ranks' married quarters becoming what is now the new civil parish and village of Hemswell Cliff. The wartime station headquarters building still stands on the new trading estate and is called Gibson House. It is used by a number of companies as office space. Hemswell almost uniquely amongst the wartime flying stations has retained its pre-war road layout, most of its buildings and an almost "RAF feel", despite being in private ownership.

Two short lengths of the original metalled runways still exist, used as farm machinery hardstanding, as do most of the hangars and station buildings which have been pressed into alternate uses by private companies. Until 2006 a private aviation museum displayed a small collection of ex-RAF aircraft on a grassed area behind the old Station Headquarters, including two Hawker Hunters, a BAC Jet Provost, a de Havilland Vampire, an English Electric Canberra and an English Electric Lightning. The museum closed and the collection has either been dispersed to other museums or broken up for spares and scrap.

The station is now totally civilian. The old H Block other rank accommodation buildings on the site have now become home to one of Europe's largest antique centres and there are also various shops, the original RAF Hemswell Post Office, a garden centre, hairdresser, used book shop and several cafés. On Sundays there is a very large Sunday market and car boot sale. Hemswell Cliff Primary School, formally the RAF primary school, still serves the children of the nearby communities. The former station officers' mess is now known as Hemswell Court and provides an elegant venue for weddings, banqueting and conference facilities. The Hemswell hangars have been pressed into service as European Union Common Agricultural Policy Intervention Stores on several occasions as a Lincolnshire location for the occasional EU "grain mountain" excesses. The former sergeants' mess was owned by the RAF and used as a community centre until 2009, then lay unused until 2021 when it was acquired by the Broadcast Engineering Conservation Group to use as a museum.

The non-profit RAF Hemswell Association's membership is open to all ranks and trades who served at Hemswell any time between 1937 and 1967. There is an annual reunion at Hemswell and the association also publishes a bi-annual magazine. Annual subscriptions are currently set at £7.

There have also been several claims of unexplained occurrences most notably in 1986 when three friends reported a diffuse 'glow' in the unoccupied watch tower, and of ghostly music being heard, where no music should be. An odd feeling was also experienced in Number 2 hangar, and the old leisure block during an overnight vigil in 1987 by the small group of friends. This account was published in Halpenny's "Ghost Stations" book (No. 5) in the early 1990s.

=== 2009 fire ===
In August 2009 there was a large fire at one of the former RAF hangars that was being used as a plastics recycling site by AWS Eco-plastics. Several propane gas cylinders exploded and as a result of the intensity of the fire the A631 had to be closed from Harpswell Hill to Caenby Corner.

=== Listed buildings ===
On 4 November 2016, Historic England announced that the former Officers' Mess was to be listed with Grade II status (listing 1435888). Opened in 1936, the mess was converted to a hotel in the 1980s and is now known as Hemswell Court.

==== Reasons for Designation ====
The former RAF Officers’ Mess built in 1935 and opened in 1936, which was converted to a hotel in the 1980s, is listed at Grade II for the following principal reasons:

- Architectural interest: it has a fine neo-Georgian composition with carefully judged proportions and good quality building materials;
- Interior: the interior treatment displays the spatial quality and understated refinement typical of the neo-Georgian idiom;
- Degree of survival: the layout, fixtures and fittings of the reception rooms in the central range survive with a high degree of intactness, and overall the external composition and configuration remains close to its original form;
- Historic interest: it is a well-preserved example of its type, that encapsulates the aims of the post-1934 Expansion Period in the lead up to World War II. It was home to two of the squadrons that were involved in the earliest action of the war, and featured prominently in the acclaimed 1954 film The Dam Busters;
- Context: it retains its immediate contemporary setting, character and relationship to other buildings, including the carefully designed layout of the tree-lined approach road and the green around which the Officers’ housing is arranged.

Other applications for listing are in the process of being made for the main site.

== See also ==
- List of former Royal Air Force stations
- Hemswell
- Hemswell Cliff
- Harpswell
- Caenby
