= Hemswell Cliff =

Village and civil parish in the West Lindsey district of Lincolnshire, England

Coordinates: 53.395190°N 0.57195°W

- Cherry blossom at Hemswell Cliff

- Location within Lincolnshire
- Population: 683 (2001)
- OS grid reference: SK950896
  - London: 130 mi (210 km) S
- District: West Lindsey
- Shire county: Lincolnshire
- Region: East Midlands
- Country: England
- Sovereign state: United Kingdom
- Post town: Gainsborough
- Postcode district: DN21
- Police: Lincolnshire
- Fire: Lincolnshire
- Ambulance: East Midlands
- UK Parliament: Gainsborough

Hemswell Cliff is a village and civil parish in the West Lindsey district of Lincolnshire, England. It is situated on the A631 road between Caenby Corner and Gainsborough and on the Lincoln Cliff escarpment. The civil parish also includes the western part of the hamlet of Spital-in-the-Street on the A15 road (Ermine Street). According to the 2001 Census the parish had a population of 683.

Hemswell Cliff Primary School is in the village.

== History ==
Until 1991 the parish formed part of the civil parish of Hemswell, historically in the West Riding of the Parts of Lindsey. RAF Hemswell was located on the site from 1937 until it closed in 1967. The airfield site was subsequently redeveloped into a private trading estate and the RAF married quarters into a residential area.

In 1991 the eastern part of Hemswell parish, extending from the B1398 road east to the A15, including the area around the trading estate, became the newly created civil parish of Hemswell Cliff. Two small developed areas south of the A631 road were also transferred to the new parish from the civil parishes of Glentworth and Harpswell

By mid-2008 there was no longer an RAF presence on the site, which became civilian. The site's old H-Block buildings contains an antique centre, shops, a garden centre, hairdresser, used book shop and cafés.

The RAF sold the community centre (originally built as the Sergeants' Mess) in 2009 but it remained unused until 2021 when the Broadcast Engineering Conservation Group, a charity, bought it. They began to repair 12 years of decay and started to create the Broadcast Engineering Museum. The group held its first public open days in September 2022.
