= Haddington, Lincolnshire =

Hamlet in the North Kesteven district of Lincolnshire, England

Coordinates: 53.156315°N 0.631799°W

Haddington
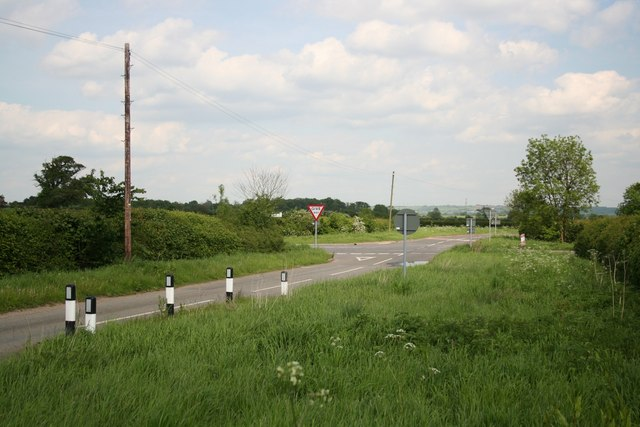
- Haddington crossroads

- Location within Lincolnshire
- OS grid reference: SK915630
  - London: 115 mi (185 km) S
- Civil parish: Aubourn with Haddington
- District: North Kesteven
- Shire county: Lincolnshire
- Region: East Midlands
- Country: England
- Sovereign state: United Kingdom
- Post town: Lincoln
- Postcode district: LN5
- Police: Lincolnshire
- Fire: Lincolnshire
- Ambulance: East Midlands
- UK Parliament: Sleaford and North Hykeham

Haddington is a hamlet in the civil parish of Aubourn with Haddington, in the North Kesteven district of Lincolnshire, England. It is situated just off the Fosse Way Roman road, now the A46, 7 miles (11 km) south-west from Lincoln and 1 mile (1.6 km) west from Aubourn. Haddington was formerly a township in the parishes of Aubourn and South Hyckham; in 1866 Haddington became a separate civil parish, and on 1 April 1931 the parish was abolished to form "Aubourn, Haddington and South Hykeham". In 1921 the parish had a population of 94.

== Geography ==
It contains a mixture of houses and farm buildings, all brick built, and stands on the north bank of the River Witham 200m from the river. The parish primary school is in South Hykeham.

== Earthworks ==
Between the hamlet and the river are the earthworks of what appears to be a considerable manorial complex or grange. However, it has not so far been possible to carry out the archaeological work needed to positively identify them. The complex consists chiefly of one more or less square moated area of 30m by 40m, surrounded by water-filled ditches. A rectangular platform which lies to the west is partly ditched and approximately 100m across; it has the appearance of part of a formal garden. There is a narrow bank across it 20m from the west end, which may conceal a buried wall; it encloses part of the west end, but is unclear at its southern corner. A 30m length of water may have been a symmetrical pond. The remainder of the earthworks continue on a layout almost at right angles to the rest. What is only visible is a medieval dovecote.

== Community ==
The ecclesiastical parish is Aubourn with Haddington which is part of The Bassingham Group of the Deanery of Graffoe. The parish church is St Peter's in Aubourn. The Bassingham group is very active, styling itself Withamside United Parish.

The mobile library visits every month.

There is no scheduled bus route but flexible public transport serves the parish.
