= Hemswell =

Village and civil parish in the West Lindsey district of Lincolnshire, England

Coordinates: 53.407168°N 0.601896°W

- All Saints Church, Hemswell

- Location within Lincolnshire
- Population: 309 (2001)
- OS grid reference: SK930909
  - London: 130 mi (210 km) S
- District: West Lindsey
- Shire county: Lincolnshire
- Region: East Midlands
- Country: England
- Sovereign state: United Kingdom
- Post town: Gainsborough
- Postcode district: DN21
- Police: Lincolnshire
- Fire: Lincolnshire
- Ambulance: East Midlands
- UK Parliament: Gainsborough

Hemswell is a village and civil parish in the West Lindsey district of Lincolnshire, England. It is situated just north of the A631 on the Lincoln Cliff escarpment, 2 miles (3 km) west from Caenby Corner and 7 miles (11 km) east from Gainsborough. According to the 2001 Census it had a population of 309.

In Domesday Hemswell is written as "Helmeswelle", a settlement of 37 households, which before 1086 was under the lordship of Earl Edwin.

Aerial photographs have shown ancient medieval settlement on the edge of the village, and 18th-century enclosure maps indicate a larger village area than now exists and the site of a medieval church. earthworks have been defined through crop markings and hollow ways, ditched enclosures, embankments and foundations of buildings that indicate the existence of crofts.

Maypole on Maypole Lane, Hemswell

Hemswell Grade II* listed Anglican parish church is dedicated to All Saints. Originating in the 13th century it was partially rebuilt in 1764, when a new tower was added, and in 1858, when the rest of the church was replaced. An internal Early English three-bay north arcade remains, as does a 13th-century Decorated sedilia on the south wall of the chancel. The font bears the arms of the Monson family. A further listed church, St Edmund's on Spital-in-the-Street Road, is a converted 16th-century quarter sessions court house.

Opposite the churchyard is a 19th-century maypole of wood and wrought iron with painted red white and blue stripes. It is one of the oldest in England, and danced round each May Day during the village May Day Fete. On Church Street is the listed early 19th-century Post Office, now non-operational, and Manor Farmhouse, originally 17th-century. On Spital-in-the-Street Road is the early 17th-century Spital Almshouse, now a cottage, and its barn, previously a hospice.

RAF Hemswell was located just outside the village from 1937 until it closed in 1967. The site and buildings were subsequently redeveloped into a private trading estate. In 1991 the eastern part of the parish, extending from the B1398 road east to the A15 (Ermine Street), including the area around the trading estate and the western part of the hamlet of Spital-in-the-Street, was separated from the parish and became the new civil parish of Hemswell Cliff.
