= HMS Glentham =

Minesweeper of the Royal Navy

History

United Kingdom
- Namesake: Glentham
- Builder: Ardrossan Dockyard
- Launched: 29 April 1957
- Completed: 20 May 1958
- Identification: Pennant number(s): M2631 / IMS33
- Fate: Sold in Singapore for scrapping April 1966

General characteristics
- Class & type: Ham-class minesweeper
- Displacement: 120 long tons (122 t) standard; 164 long tons (167 t) full load
- Length: 100 ft (30 m) p/p; 106 ft 6 in (32.46 m) o/a
- Beam: 21 ft 4 in (6.50 m)
- Draught: 5 ft 6 in (1.68 m)
- Propulsion: 2 shaft Paxman 12YHAXM diesels1,100 bhp (820 kW)
- Speed: 14 knots (26 km/h; 16 mph)
- Complement: 2 officers, 13 ratings
- Armament: 1 × Bofors 40 mm L/60 gun or Oerlikon 20 mm cannon

HMS Glentham was one of 93 ships of the Ham-class of inshore minesweepers.

Their names were all chosen from villages ending in -ham. The minesweeper was named after Glentham in Lincolnshire.
