= Caenby =

Hamlet and civil parish in Lincolnshire, England

Coordinates: 53°23′N 0°29′W

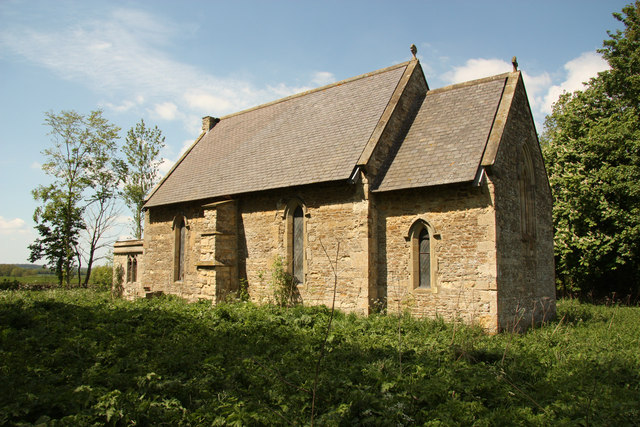
- The grade II listed St.Nicholas' church in Caenby

- Location within Lincolnshire
- OS grid reference: TF001893
  - London: 130 mi (210 km) S
- District: West Lindsey
- Shire county: Lincolnshire
- Region: East Midlands
- Country: England
- Sovereign state: United Kingdom
- Post town: Market Rasen
- Postcode district: LN8
- Police: Lincolnshire
- Fire: Lincolnshire
- Ambulance: East Midlands
- UK Parliament: Gainsborough

Caenby is a hamlet and civil parish in the West Lindsey district of Lincolnshire, England. It is situated 10 miles (16 km) north of the city and county town of Lincoln. The population is included in the civil parish of Glentham.

The place name, Caenby, seems to contain an unrecorded Old Norse personal name Kafni, + bȳ (Old Norse), a farmstead, a village, so possibly, 'Kafni's farm or settlement'. The place appears in the Domesday Book of 1086 as Couenebi.

Caenby's Grade II listed Anglican church is dedicated to St Nicholas. A moated manor house, now the Grade II listed Hall Farm House, was a seat of the Tournay family from the time of Edward I to George II. In 1541 Henry VIII slept here while on his Lincolnshire progress. In the 18th century, Lawrence Monck occupied the house.

In 1945 fields adjacent to Caenby were a military Q decoy site maintained by RAF Hemswell. Dummy plywood buildings, inflatable rubber aircraft or vehicles, and a ploughed faux runway were set up to simulate an active airfield and draw German bombers away from genuine target airfields.

== See also ==
- Caenby Corner
