= Aubourn with Haddington =

Coordinates: 53.154°N 0.6277°W

- Civil parish
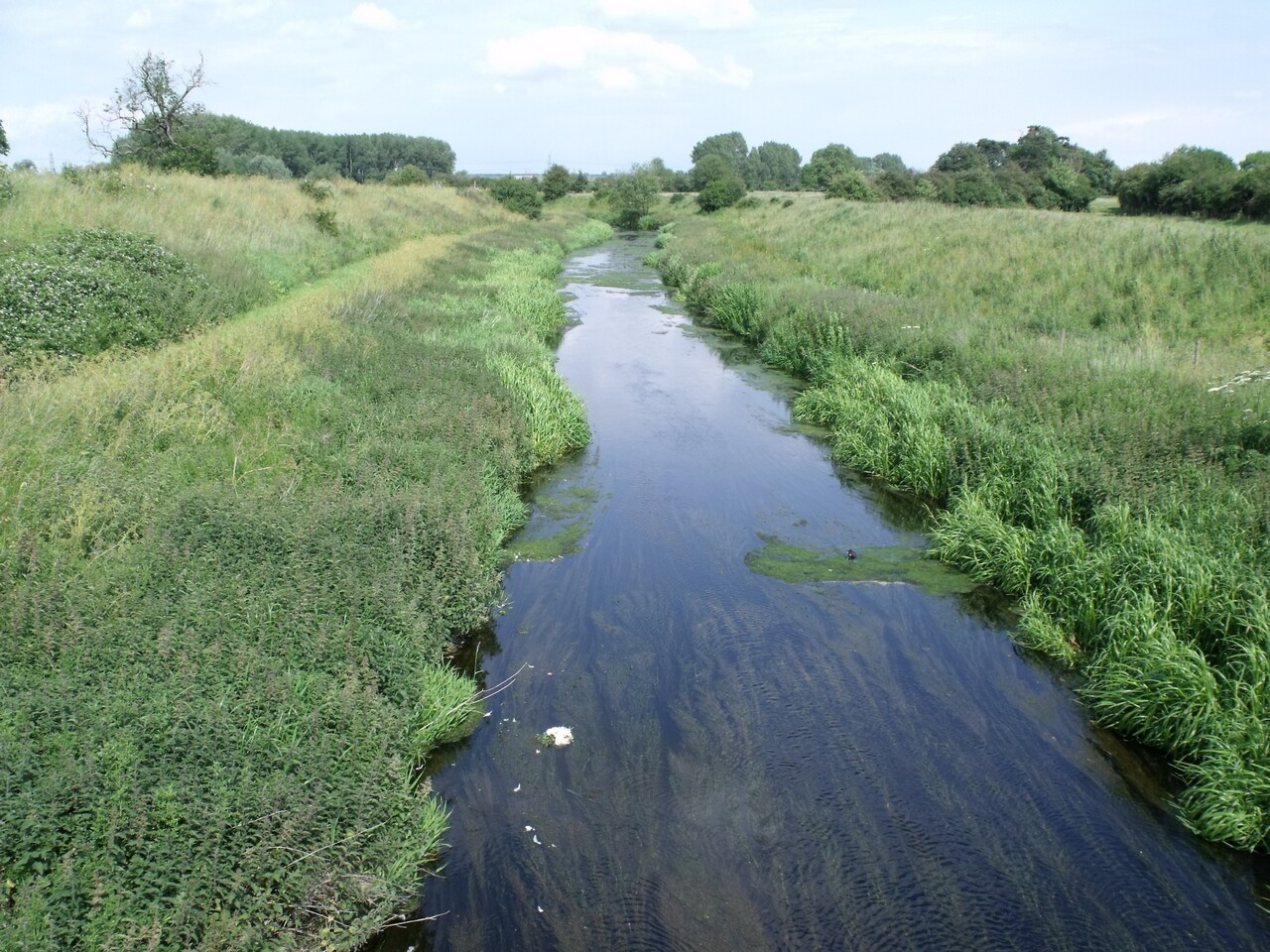
- River Witham between Aubourn and Haddington

- Location within Lincolnshire
- Country: England
- County: Lincolnshire
- District: North Kesteven
- Established: 1991
- Seat: Aubourn and Haddington

Population (2011 census)
  - Total: 460
- River: River Witham

Aubourn with Haddington or Aubourn and Haddington is a civil parish in the North Kesteven district of Lincolnshire, England. The population of the civil parish at the 2011 census was 460.

The parish includes the villages of Aubourn and Haddington. The two villages are on opposite banks of the River Witham.

The parish was formed when the parish of Aubourn Haddington and South Hykeham was dissolved in 1991 to become two separate parishes: Aubourn with Haddington, and South Hykeham.

== See also ==
- South Hykeham
