= Broadcast Engineering Conservation Group =

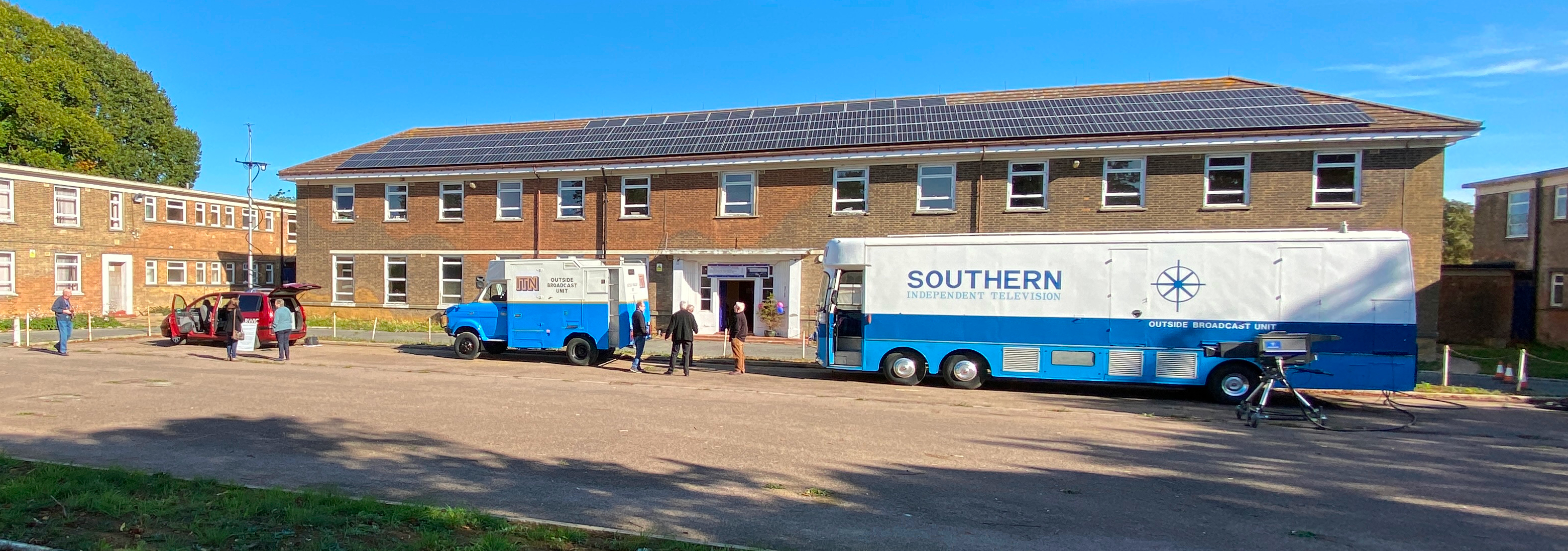
- Broadcast Engineering Museum

- Hemswell Cliff (Lincolnshire)
- Abbreviation: BECG
- Type: Charitable incorporated organisation
- Purpose: Conservation, education
- Headquarters: Broadcast Engineering Museum, 41 Capper Avenue, Hemswell Cliff, Lincolnshire DN21 5XS
- Coordinates: 53.39754°N 0.57268°W
- Website: becg.org.uk

The Broadcast Engineering Conservation Group (BECG) conserves historic broadcasting equipment. It is based at Hemswell Cliff in Lincolnshire, England and is a Charitable incorporated organisation.

The group was founded by people with large private collections of broadcasting equipment, including several Outside Broadcast (OB) vehicles. It is led by six trustees, many of them working or retired broadcast industry professionals.

In 2021 the group purchased its present building and is converting it into a permanent home for its collection known as the Broadcast Engineering Museum. To date, the museum only opens for visitors on special occasions or for groups by appointment.

A newsletter called Line-Up is published a few times each year and back issues are available on the BECG website, as is a 3D virtual tour.

== History ==
Members of the group had been collecting and restoring broadcasting equipment and vehicles for many years before forming BECG in 2017. Some of these vehicles have been fully restored, while others are works in progress.

The group was formally incorporated as a charity by six founding trustees in May 2020.

In November 2021, the group bought the former RAF Sergeants' Mess at Hemswell Cliff. The building provides a permanent home for the collection and forms the Broadcast Engineering Museum. As well as the main building, there are east and west wings of similar size and two large function rooms and workshops behind.

This building had been unused for 12 years and needed a lot of repairs. The local authority, West Lindsey District Council, provided BECG with funding towards the repair of broken windows.

Since acquiring the building, repairs and improvements have been made by both contractors and volunteers. In the first year vegetation was cut back, uneven ground levelled, leaking roofs repaired, drains unblocked and over 150 broken window panes replaced. A solar PV array was installed on the main south-facing roof and a CCTV system provided.

Two large rooms were converted into videotape and telecine display areas. The videotape area contains several 2" quadruplex and 1" C-format machines as well as more modern formats. The telecine area contains machines capable of scanning 8, 9.5, 16 and 35mm film.

In September 2022, BECG held its first public open days as part of the Heritage Open Days scheme and had about 200 visitors. About half were from the local area and half from further afield.

== Collection ==
Major items in the collection include:

=== Videotape equipment ===
==== 2-inch quadruplex ====
- Ampex VR-2000
- Ampex AVR-2
- Ampex AVR-3
- RCA TR70B (405/525/625-line)

==== 1-inch C-format ====
- Ampex VPR-3
- Marconi MR2B in 'table top' format
- Marconi MR2Bs: editing pair in console format
- Sony BVH-2000PS
- Sony BVH-3100PS

==== 1-inch B-format ====
- Bosch Fernseh machine from 1976

=== Studio cameras ===
- EMI 203, 2001 and 2005
- Ikegami HK323, HK355W
- IVC 7000P
- Link 125
- Marconi MkII, MkIII, MkIV, MkVIII, MkIX
- Philips LDK5
- Vinten pedestals (various types)

=== Film and telecine equipment ===
- Marconi B3402 'island' telecine
- Marconi B3410 line array telecine
- Rank Cintel Mk3 'flying spot' telecine
- Acmade 'Miniola' 16mm editor
- Ciniola editor
- Moviola editor
- Steenbeck 16/35mm flat editing table with magnetic and optical sound
- Panavision 'Panaflex' 35mm camera from 1972

=== Audio equipment ===
- Mole-Richardson 103B microphone boom
- Consoles from Audix, Glensound, Neve, Soundcraft

=== Outside broadcast vehicles ===
- Southern: a.k.a. Big Bertha, possibly the oldest working colour OB scanner in the world
- Yorkshire-Tyne Tees: originally a Yorkshire TV scanner but currently in Tyne Tees livery
- BBC mobile videotape unit LMVT1 (originally with two Ampex AVR1 quadruplex VTRs)
- Project Vivat: a re-creation of a 1950s Marconi-equipped BBC OB unit with three working Marconi Mk III cameras; ex-BBC vehicle was originally MCR23.
- BBC Type 5 colour vehicle LO6 (CMCR20)
- BBC compact CMCR LO21 (CMCR39)
- ABC-Thames: originally ABC's monochrome OB truck, converted to colour by Thames TV
- P5: ex-BBC 27 kVA diesel generator on a petrol-powered truck. One of a series of ten. 1952 Bedford type ML chassis, fitted with 6-cylinder diesel generator in 1953.
- BBC radio car: one of ten Peugeot 807 cars equipped by dB Broadcast in 2005 for use by local radio stations

=== Transmitter equipment ===
- A CAT9 (Cooled Anode Triode) transmitter valve
