= Glentham =

Village and civil parish in the West Lindsey district of Lincolnshire, England

Coordinates: 53.404540°N 0.496532°W

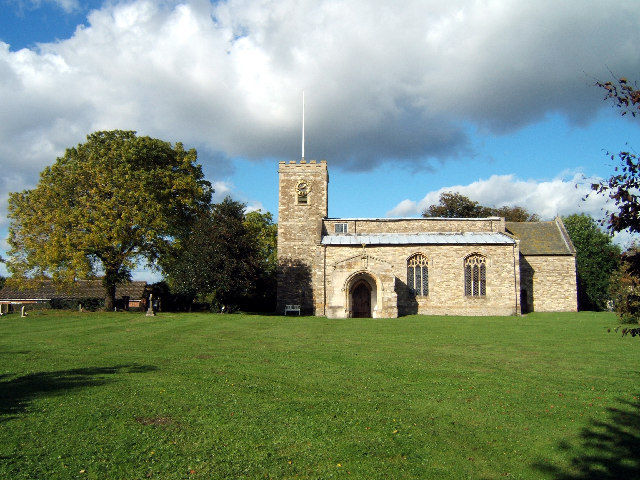
- Church of SS Peter and Paul, Glentham

- Location within Lincolnshire
- Population: 508 (2011)
- OS grid reference: TF000907
  - London: 130 mi (210 km) S
- District: West Lindsey
- Shire county: Lincolnshire
- Region: East Midlands
- Country: England
- Sovereign state: United Kingdom
- Post town: Market Rasen
- Postcode district: LN8
- Police: Lincolnshire
- Fire: Lincolnshire
- Ambulance: East Midlands
- UK Parliament: Gainsborough

Glentham is a village and civil parish in the West Lindsey district of Lincolnshire, England. It is situated on the A631, 6 miles (9.7 km) west from Market Rasen, and 2 miles (3.2 km) east from Caenby Corner and the A15.

The civil parish includes the hamlet of Bishopbridge, on the A631 2 miles (3 km) east of the village, and the eastern part of the hamlet of Spital-in-the-Street on the A15 (Ermine Street) 2 miles (3 km) west of the village.

== Etymology ==
The Oxford Dictionary of English Place Names gives the derivation of the name Glentham as glente + hām, meaning either ″homestead frequented by birds of prey″ or ″homestead at a lookout place″. Caenby is said to probably mean ″farmstead or village of a man called Cāfna or Kafni″.

== History ==
=== Domesday Book ===
Glentham was mentioned in the Domesday Book of 1086, as being in the Aslacoe hundred in the West Riding of Lindsey. It had a total population of 64 households (very large for the time) with tax assessment of 8 geld units (again very large). Land in Glentham was held by four separate lords before the Norman Conquest and three afterwards:

Lord in 1066: Lincoln St Mary, bishop of. Lord in 1086: Lincoln St Mary, bishop of. Tenant-in-chief in 1086: Lincoln St Mary, bishop of.

Lord in 1066: Thorgisl. Lord in 1086: Rainfrid. Tenant-in-chief in 1086: Ivo Tallboys.

Lords in 1066: Estan of Farningham; Wulfmer. Lord in 1086: Wadard of Cogges. Tenant-in-chief in 1086: Bishop Odo of Bayeux.

=== World War II ===
The first bombs to land in Lincolnshire were on the night of June 5 1940, with two HE bombs.

=== 1961 air incident ===
A BAC Jet Provost crashed at 3.30pm on Thursday 23 March 1961. The pilot ejected, Pilot Off JB Fardell from RAF Syerston. The fire engines were from Lincoln and Lindsey Fire Brigade at Market Rasen and Caistor.

== Religious Buildings ==
Glentham Grade I listed Anglican church is dedicated to St Peter and St Paul. Originating in the 13th century, it has had additions and changes up to the 20th. It is mainly Perpendicular in style. Nikolaus Pevsner dates the tower from 1756, and a stained glass window by Christopher Whall from 1915. In the chancel and the north aisle are monuments and brasses to the Tourney family of Cavenby. Set within a niche over the south porch is an image of Pieta holding the dead Christ. At the west of the church is a mutilated 14th-century brass effigy of a female; previously known as "Molly Grime", it was, up to 1832, washed every Good Friday by seven old maids.

In 1885 Kelly's Directory recorded both a Wesleyan and Primitive Methodist chapel, and a nearby barrow. At that time much land in the area was given over to pasture, while main crops grown were wheat, barley and beans.

The ecclesiastical parish is part of the Owmby Group of parishes.

== Amenities ==
Glentham has a public house, The Crown Inn, a shop, a garden centre (with associated business units) and a village hall.

== Other ==
The village gave its name to a Ham class minesweeper, HMS Glentham.
