= Glentworth, Lincolnshire =

Village and civil parish in the West Lindsey district of Lincolnshire, England

Coordinates: 53.385105°N 0.576750°W

Glentworth
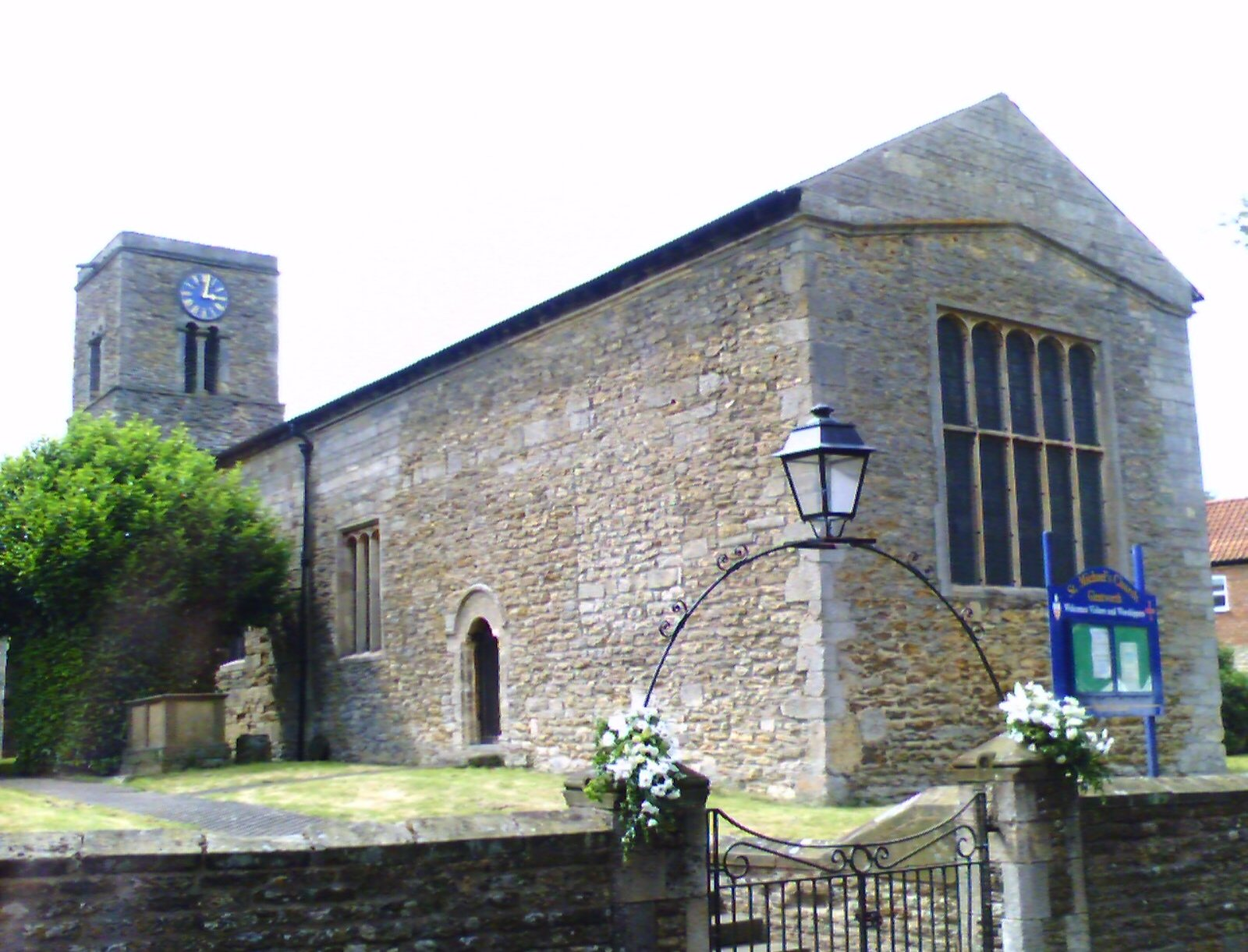
- Church of St Michael, Glentworth

- Location within Lincolnshire
- Population: 323 (2011)
- OS grid reference: SK947885
  - London: 130 mi (210 km) S
- District: West Lindsey
- Shire county: Lincolnshire
- Region: East Midlands
- Country: England
- Sovereign state: United Kingdom
- Post town: GAINSBOROUGH
- Postcode district: DN21
- Police: Lincolnshire
- Fire: Lincolnshire
- Ambulance: East Midlands
- UK Parliament: Louth and Horncastle

Glentworth is a village and civil parish in the West Lindsey district of Lincolnshire, England. The population of the parish (including Caenby Corner) was 323 at the 2011 census. It is situated approximately 10 miles (16 km) north from the centre of the city and county town of Lincoln, and just over 1 mile (1.6 km) south-west from Caenby Corner.

The name Glentworth comes from the Old English glente + worth for "enclosure frequented by birds of prey". In the Domesday Book it is noted as "Glentewrde".

The Church of England parish church of Saint Michael dates from three periods, as shown by the varied masonry of its outside walls. The oldest part is the Anglo-Saxon tower. The middle section of the present church is the product of Georgian and Victorian rebuilding. Its eastern end, with its rougher stonework, is largely Elizabethan.

Glentworth is the site of Glentworth Hall, an Elizabethan country house built by Christopher Wray.

Villagers construct scarecrows for an annual themed 'Glentworth Scarecrows' competition event.
