= Aubourn =

Village in Lincolnshire, England

Coordinates: 53.1524°N 0.62265°W

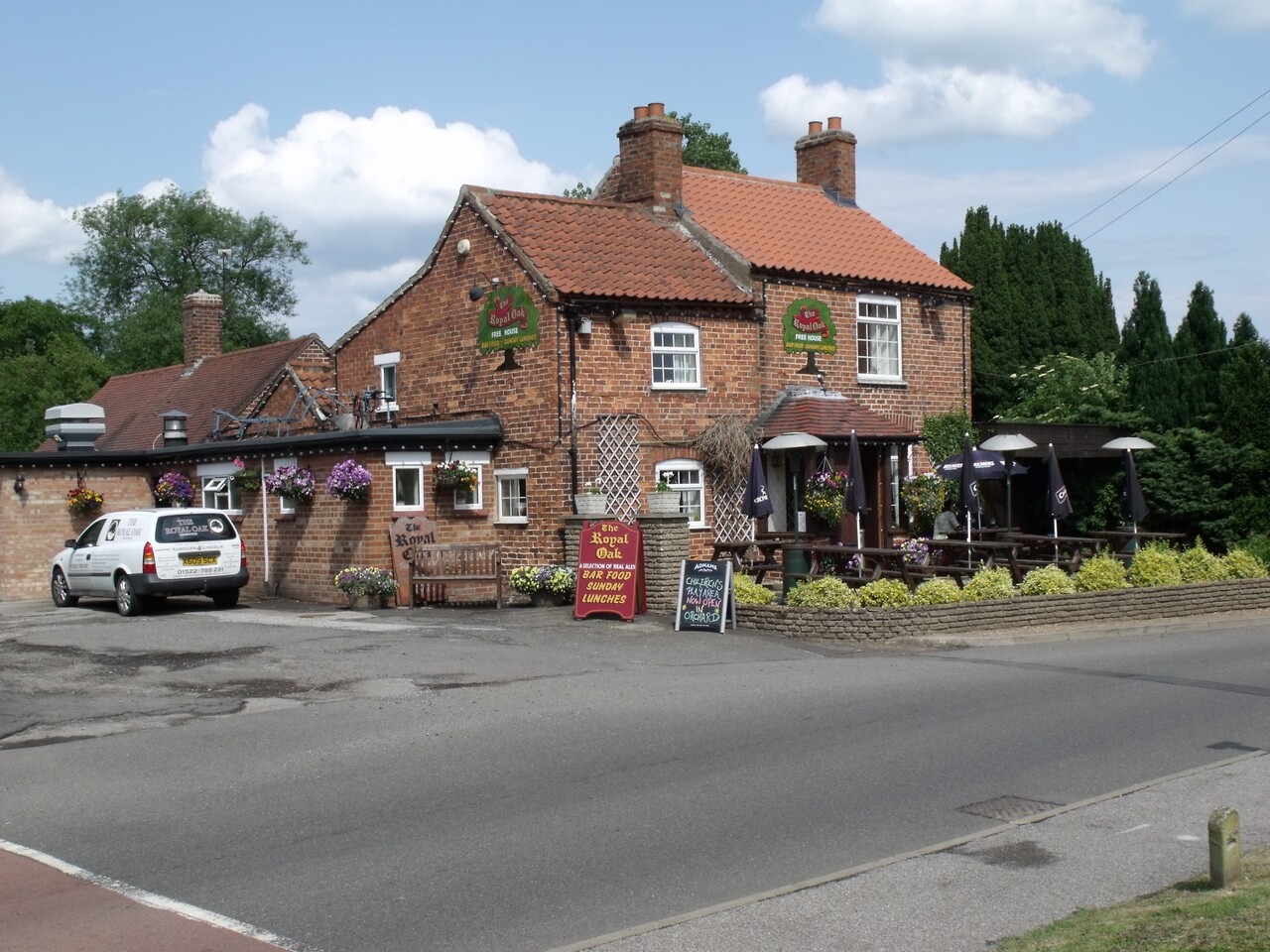
- The Royal Oak

- Location within Lincolnshire
- OS grid reference: SK922625
  - London: 115 mi (185 km) S
- Civil parish: Aubourn with Haddington
- District: North Kesteven
- Shire county: Lincolnshire
- Region: East Midlands
- Country: England
- Sovereign state: United Kingdom
- Post town: Lincoln
- Postcode district: LN5
- Police: Lincolnshire
- Fire: Lincolnshire
- Ambulance: East Midlands
- UK Parliament: Sleaford and North Hykeham (UK Parliament constituency)

Aubourn ("Stream where the Alders grow") is a small village in the civil parish of Aubourn with Haddington, in the North Kesteven district, in the county of Lincolnshire, England. It is just east of the A46, in between Lincoln and Newark-on-Trent. It has a one-way system that is unusual for a small countryside village, and a public house called 'The Royal Oak'. In 1921 the parish had a population of 212. On 1 April 1931 the parish was abolished to form "Aubourn, Haddington and South Hykeham".

== Geography ==
The village of Aubourn is located approximately 8 miles (13 km) south, south west of the City of Lincoln, adjacent to the River Witham, which winds its way eastwards to The Haven, a tidal arm of the Wash. Before the Second World War, the lower land to the east of the village was allowed to flood during the winter if the river rose too high, but since then a flood bank 2.5 metre high has been erected to prevent flooding and protect the village. The village lies on the C103 road between the A46 and the A607 at Harmston, and in the absence of an alternative route also provides a natural link to the A15. Consequently, the village is likely to benefit from the construction of the North Hykeham Relief Road, formerly described as the Lincoln Southern Bypass. The village is well situated for walks and horse riding.

== Landmarks ==
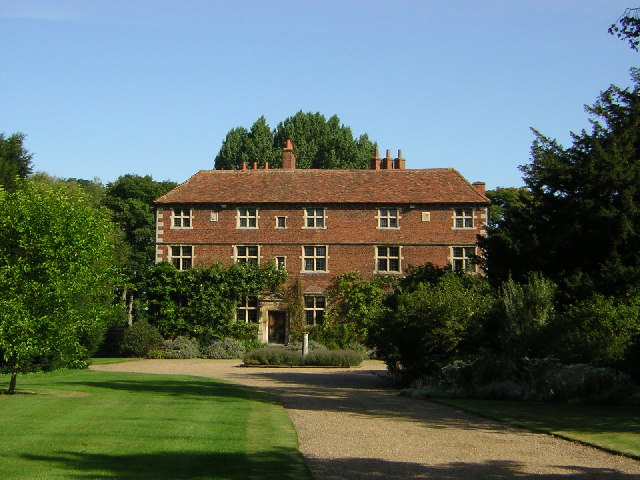
Aubourn Hall

At the eastern end of the village stands Aubourn Hall, an early to mid-17th-century house set in 1.2 ha of gardens. Built for Sir John Meres between 1587 and 1628, possibly on Tudor foundations, it is brick, with stone quoins, and three storeys high. The interior of the house includes a carved staircase and panelled rooms. The property has been the home of the Nevile family since the 17th century.

To the east of the Hall is the eleventh century parish church, dedicated to St Peter. The present church was built around 1200 on the site of an earlier church built of wood and stone and recorded in the Domesday Book of 1086. When it was built, the church was a larger structure than today's and included a nave, porch and tower. In 1862 most of the building was demolished following the building of a new parish church on a new site, leaving just the chancel standing. However, the original foundations can still be seen in the churchyard in front of the main door.

The new church, also dedicated to St Peter, was built on a site midway between Aubourn and Haddington, a large hamlet 1 mile (1.61 km) west of Aubourn, which is part of Aubourn parish and therefore does not have a church of its own.

The new Victorian church was not as well built as the older church had been, and by 1968, it had deteriorated to the point that it was thought unsafe for congregational use. After its abandonment it was used as a mortuary. In 1933, the older church was restored, with a new altar and a gallery for the organ installed. After the newer church had run down, the old church saw more use. Only the tower and chancel of the newer church, as well as the derelict walls of the South transept, remain in the churchyard today.

== See also ==
- List of places in Lincolnshire
