= South Hykeham =

Village and civil parish in the North Kesteven district of Lincolnshire, England

Coordinates: 53.170510°N 0.60052°W

- Village, Civil Parish and Suburb
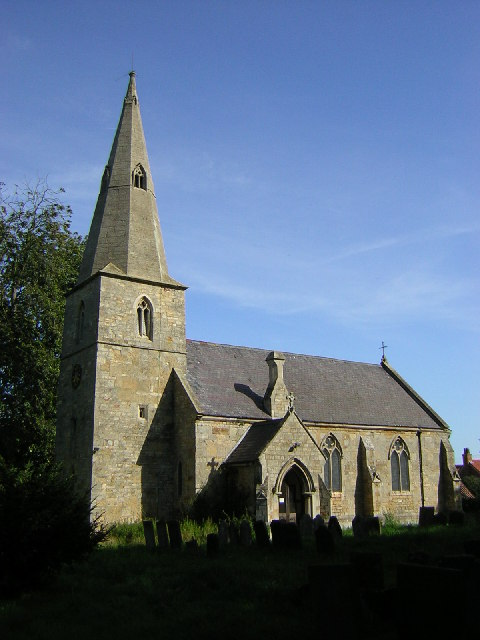
- St Michael's Church, South Hykeham

- Location within Lincolnshire
- Population: 835 (2011)
- OS grid reference: SK936646
  - London: 120 mi (190 km) S
- Civil parish: South Hykeham
- District: North Kesteven
- Shire county: Lincolnshire
- Region: East Midlands
- Country: England
- Sovereign state: United Kingdom
- Post town: Lincoln
- Postcode district: LN6
- Police: Lincolnshire
- Fire: Lincolnshire
- Ambulance: East Midlands
- UK Parliament: Sleaford and North Hykeham

South Hykeham is a village and civil parish in the North Kesteven district of Lincolnshire, England. The population of the civil parish at the 2011 census was 835. It is situated approximately 3 miles (5 km) south-west of Lincoln, and on the A1434 road. Since 1931, South Hykeham formed part of the civil parish of Aubourn Haddington and South Hykeham, but this relationship was broken in 1991 and South Hykeham is again a civil parish. It today forms part of the wider Lincoln Urban Area and is contigious with North Hykeham.

South Hykeham is mentioned in the Domesday Book of 1086, in which it is described as "Hichum", with 14 households and two fisheries.

The Grade II* listed parish church is dedicated to Saint Michael and dates from the 13th century, although it was restored and added to by Drury and Mortimer in 1869.

South Hykeham Community Primary School was built in 1869 as a National school.
