= Caenby Corner =

Small area in Lincolnshire, England

Coordinates: 53.393°N 0.5476°W

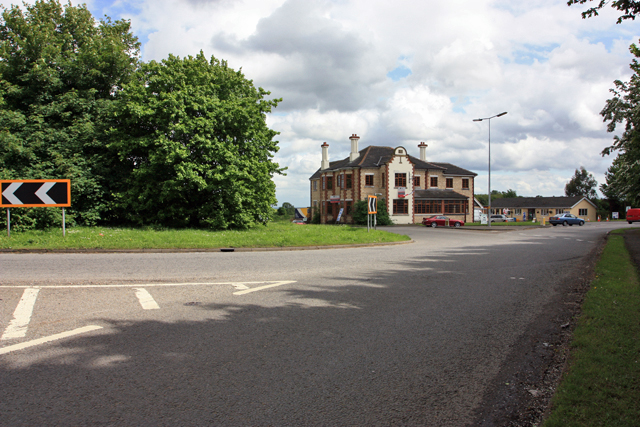
- Refurbished but empty, the Moncks Arms stands on the roundabout at Caenby Corner. The transport cafe on the extreme right remains open.

- Location within Lincolnshire
- OS grid reference: SK966894
  - London: 130 mi (210 km) S
- District: West Lindsey
- Shire county: Lincolnshire
- Region: East Midlands
- Country: England
- Sovereign state: United Kingdom
- Post town: Market Rasen
- Postcode district: LN8
- Police: Lincolnshire
- Fire: Lincolnshire
- Ambulance: East Midlands
- UK Parliament: Louth and Horncastle

Caenby Corner is a small area in the West Lindsey district of Lincolnshire, England, at the roundabout junction of the A15 and A631 roads.

== Geography ==
Close to the village of Caenby, it is situated on what was a major Roman road known as Ermine Street leading from London to the North of England. The junction is 10 miles (16 km) north from the city and county town of Lincoln. The junction is on the boundary of four civil parishes. The south east quadrant is in Caenby parish, the south west quadrant is in Glentworth, the north west quadrant is in Hemswell Cliff and the north east quadrant in Glentham.

Joanna, daughter of Alan Montagu-Stuart-Wortley-Mackenzie, 4th Earl of Wharncliffe, was killed at the junction on the afternoon of Sunday March 8 1981, who had attended the local Riseholme College. The Volkswagen Golf GTI had left the road, with her boyfriend from Blyborough.

== History ==
On 2 June 1939 Handley Page Hampden 'L4128', from 144 Sqn at RAF Hemswell, crashed 200 yards away. Three airmen were killed, who burned to death.

- Pilot Officer Hugh Salisbury James, aged 19, from Southern Rhodesia
- Sgt Harold Kinlock, aged 31
- Aircraftman Donald Eskburn Shimmin, aged 20, of Wallasey

== Facilities ==
On Caenby Corner roundabout is a filling station with shop and separate coffee shop, a private residence and the closed Moncks Arms hotel with adjacent transport cafe and lorry park. The hotel had for many years been derelict, but in 2007 there were plans to redevelop it. Despite the re-cladding to the outside of the building, the hotel has never re-opened.

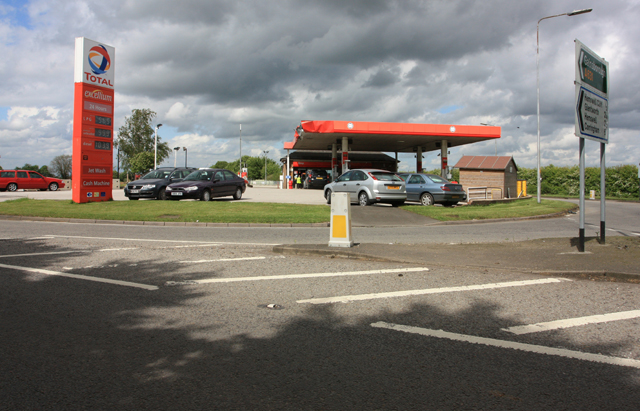
Caenby Corner petrol station
